= John J. DeGioia =

American academic administrator and philosopher (born 1957)

John DeGioia
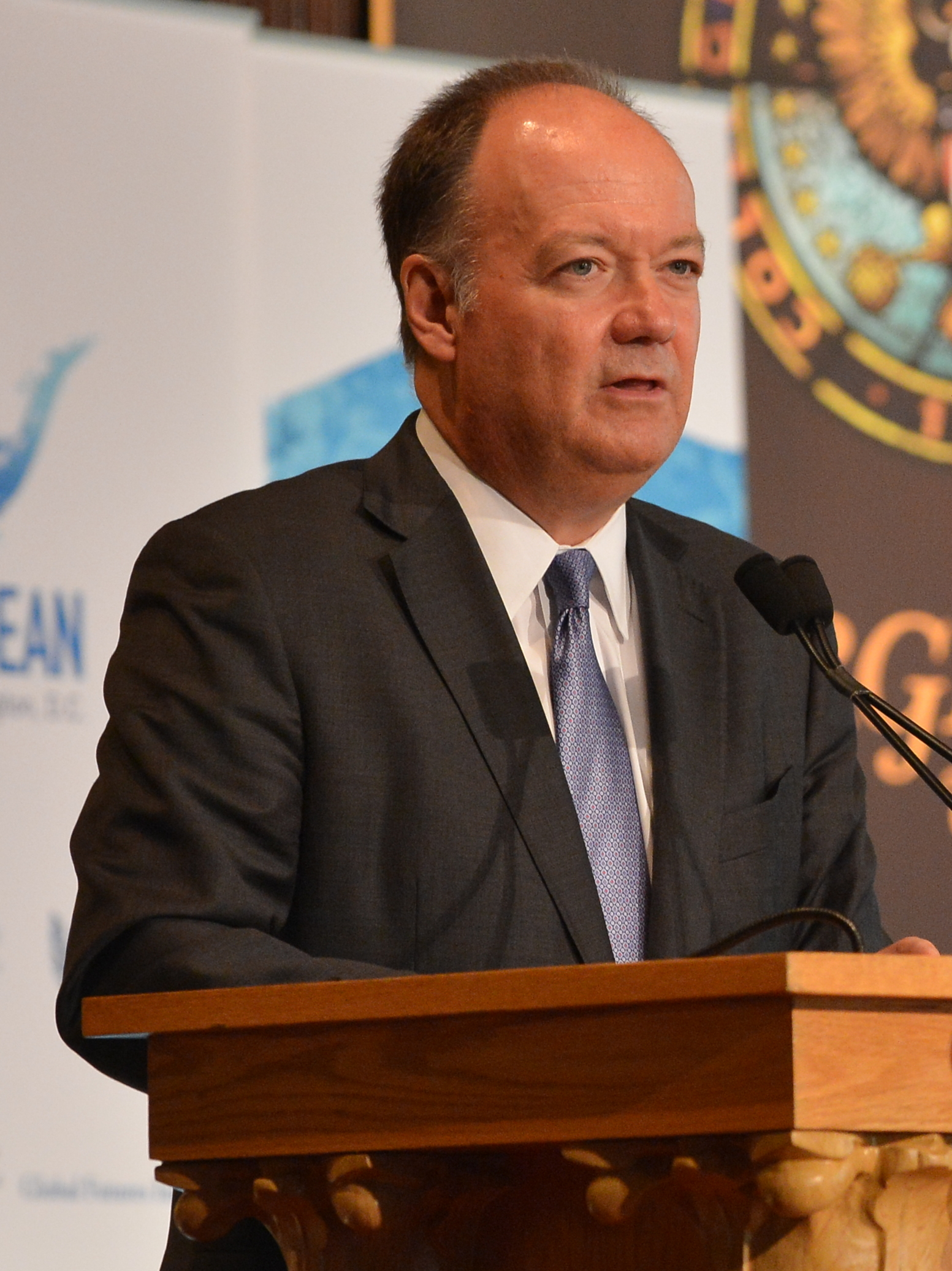
- DeGioia in 2016

48th President of Georgetown University
- In office July 1, 2001 – November 21, 2024
- Preceded by: Leo J. O'Donovan
- Succeeded by: Eduardo Peñalver

Personal details
- Born: John Joseph DeGioia; 1957 (age 68–69) Connecticut, U.S.
- Spouse: Theresa Miller (m. 1994)
- Education: Georgetown University (BA, MA, PhD)

Academic background
- Thesis: The Moral Theories of Charles Taylor and Alasdair MacIntyre and the Objective Moral Order (1995)
- Doctoral advisor: Terry Pinkard

Academic work
- Discipline: Philosophy
- Institutions: Georgetown University

John Joseph DeGioia (born 1957) is an American academic administrator and philosopher who served as the president of Georgetown University from 2001 to 2024. He was the first lay president of the school and its longest-serving president. Upon his appointment, he also became the first lay president of any Jesuit university in the United States. Having spent his entire career at Georgetown, where he received his undergraduate and graduate degrees, DeGioia was the dean of student affairs and held various vice presidential positions before becoming president.

== Early life and education ==
John Joseph DeGioia was born in Connecticut in 1957, and was raised in Orange, Connecticut, and Hanford, California. He attended Amity Regional High School in Woodbridge, Connecticut, graduating in 1975. He then attended Georgetown College at Georgetown University, where he majored in English. DeGioia also played sports and founded the Georgetown chapter of the Fellowship of Christian Athletes. He graduated with a Bachelor of Arts in 1979.

== Georgetown University administrator ==
=== Dean and vice president ===
Upon graduation, DeGioia became a hall director at one of Georgetown's freshman dormitories, New South Hall. In 1982, he became an assistant to university president Timothy S. Healy, where he oversaw the office of the president. Three years later he was named dean of student affairs, during which time he led the university's committee on free speech, expanded the university's psychological and counseling services, and implemented a program to track the performance of student athletes. He also participated in two fundraising campaigns, one of which raised money for the construction of the Leavey Center. As dean of student affairs, he also was involved in the conflicts over Georgetown's Catholic identity during the tenure of Healy's successor, Leo J. O'Donovan. DeGioia was criticized by some Catholics for allowing the formation of a student abortion rights group in 1991. The funding for the group was later revoked due to three events that DeGioia claimed advocated for abortion, violating the terms he had set out for the club.

O'Donovan named DeGioia the associate vice president and chief administrative officer of Georgetown's main campus in 1992. DeGioia received his Doctor of Philosophy in philosophy from the university's Graduate School of Arts and Sciences in 1995. He has taught undergraduates at the university as a professor of philosophy since that time.

That same year, DeGioia was promoted to vice president, overseeing all operations of the main campus, including the university's finances, undergraduate admissions, financial aid, athletics, and student affairs. He was promoted to senior vice president in 1998, where he was responsible for all university-wide operations. In this capacity, he managed the Georgetown Medical Center's financial and academic strategy, and ultimately negotiated the sale of the Georgetown University Hospital to MedStar Health in 2000, while retaining university ownership of the School of Medicine.

=== University president ===
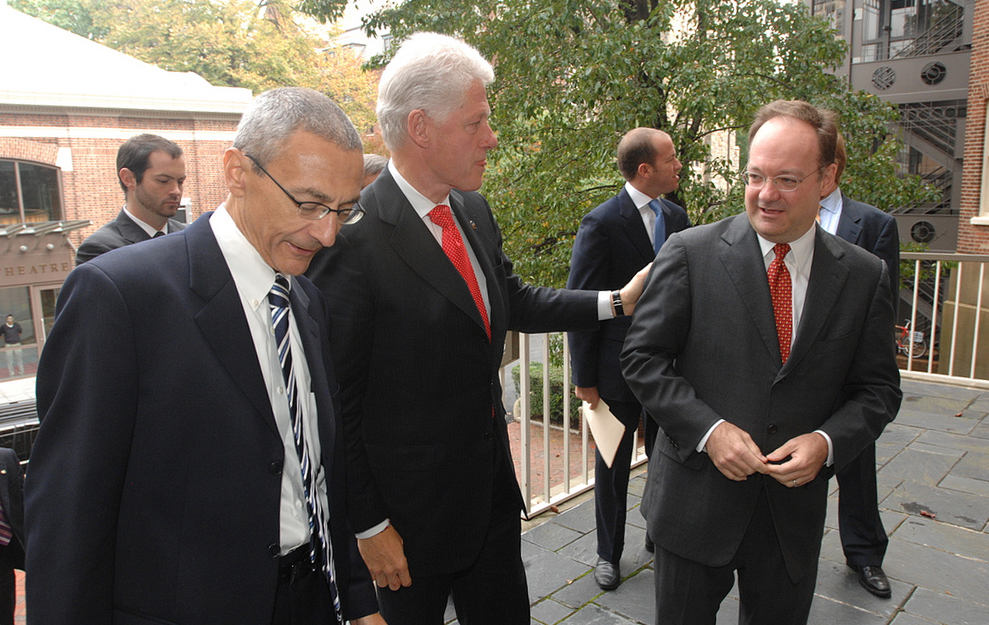
DeGioia with former President Bill Clinton and White House Chief of Staff John Podesta in 2006, outside the Old North Building on the campus of Georgetown University

On July 1, 2001, DeGioia became the president of Georgetown University. Succeeding O'Donovan, upon his appointment, DeGioia became the first lay president of any Jesuit university in the United States. It was the board of directors' initial intention to hire a Jesuit for the job, but they determined that there was not a suitable candidate for the office. In his inauguration speech on October 14, DeGioia expressed his commitment to carrying on the Jesuit tradition of the university. Upon assuming office, he oversaw the successful completion of a $1 billion fundraising campaign (equivalent to $1.8 billion in 2025), which the board of directors had begun in 1995. DeGioia began another major fundraising campaign in 2011, which reached its goal of $1.5 billion in 2015 (equivalent to $2 billion in 2025), one year ahead of schedule.

A number of construction projects were undertaken during DeGioia's presidency. He assumed office midway through the construction of the Southwest Quadrangle, and oversaw its completion. Additionally, a new, 154,000-square-foot (14,300 m^{2}) science building, Regents Hall, opened in 2012, and the John R. Thompson, Jr. Intercollegiate Athletic Center opened in 2016.

Several new academic components were created during his tenure. The largest of these were the Georgetown campus in Qatar, which opened in 2005, and the McCourt School of Public Policy, which was founded in 2013. Permanent programs also were established in Shanghai and London.

DeGioia was involved in several controversies as president. In 2012, he publicly came to the defense of a student at the Georgetown University Law Center, Sandra Fluke, following her testimony before the U.S. House of Representatives in support of the Affordable Care Act's contraceptive mandate, when political pundit Rush Limbaugh made disparaging comments about her. That same year, DeGioia was criticized by prominent Catholics, including the Archbishop of Washington, Cardinal Donald Wuerl, for Georgetown's invitation of Kathleen Sebelius, the Secretary of Health and Human Services and author of the contraceptive mandate, to be honored as a graduation speaker. This prompted William Peter Blatty, a Georgetown alumnus, to file a canon lawsuit with the Vatican, requesting that it order the university to comply with Ex corde Ecclesiae.

In 2016, DeGioia convened a systemic study of and apology for the university's 19th-century connection to slavery.

DeGioia became the longest-serving president in Georgetown's history in 2014. On June 5, 2024, he suffered a stroke and was in stable condition after prompt medical intervention. On November 21, 2024, DeGioia announced that he would resign as president to focus on his recovery. He will hold the title of president emeritus and will remain a member of the faculty.

== Honors and affiliations ==
In addition to his role as university president, DeGioia is involved in a number of national education organizations. He has been the chair of the board of directors of the American Council on Education and the Forum for the Future of Higher Education, and the chair of the board of governors of the National Collegiate Athletic Association (NCAA). He has been a member of the boards of directors of the Carnegie Corporation of New York and the National Association of Independent Schools, as well as a commissioner of the Knight Commission on Intercollegiate Athletics. He is a member of the World Economic Forum's Global Agenda Council on Values and WEF's Global University Leaders Forum.

DeGioia was presented the "Lifetime Achievement Award for Excellence in Academia" by the Order Sons of Italy in America in 2004, and the "Catholic in the Public Square Award" by Commonweal magazine in 2012. He was named "Washingtonian of the Year" by Washingtonian magazine in 2008, and a "Brave Thinker" by The Atlantic in 2012.

DeGioia was inducted into the Amity Regional High School hall of honor in 2006. In 2010, he was elected a member of the American Academy of Arts and Sciences. He has received honorary degrees from Miami Dade College in 2008, Loyola University Maryland in 2009, Queens University Belfast in 2009, Sacred Heart University in 2011, Mount Aloysius College in 2015, and Seattle University in 2016. In addition, he has received an honorary fellowship at Wrexham Glyndŵr University in 2010, and the "Esteemed Friend" award from Sophia University in Tokyo in 2014. He has been a member of the U.S. National Commission for UNESCO.

== Personal life ==
DeGioia's father, John G. DeGioia, worked as a customer service specialist for a Connecticut manufacturing company. His mother taught gifted students in the Hanford, California, public schools.

On November 5, 1994, DeGioia married Theresa Anne Miller, a 1989 graduate of Georgetown University. Both Catholic, they were married at Holy Trinity Church in the Georgetown neighborhood, in a ceremony presided over by DeGioia's uncle and Jesuit priest, John J. Begley. They have one son. DeGioia is a member of the Order of Malta.

Academic offices
Preceded by Leo J. O'Donovan	President of Georgetown University; 2001–2024	Succeeded by Robert Groves; Acting
