= Copley Hall =

Copley Hall could refer to:

- Copley Hall, a dormitory at Georgetown University
- Copley Hall, Boston
