= Georgetown University Library =

University library in Washington, D.C.

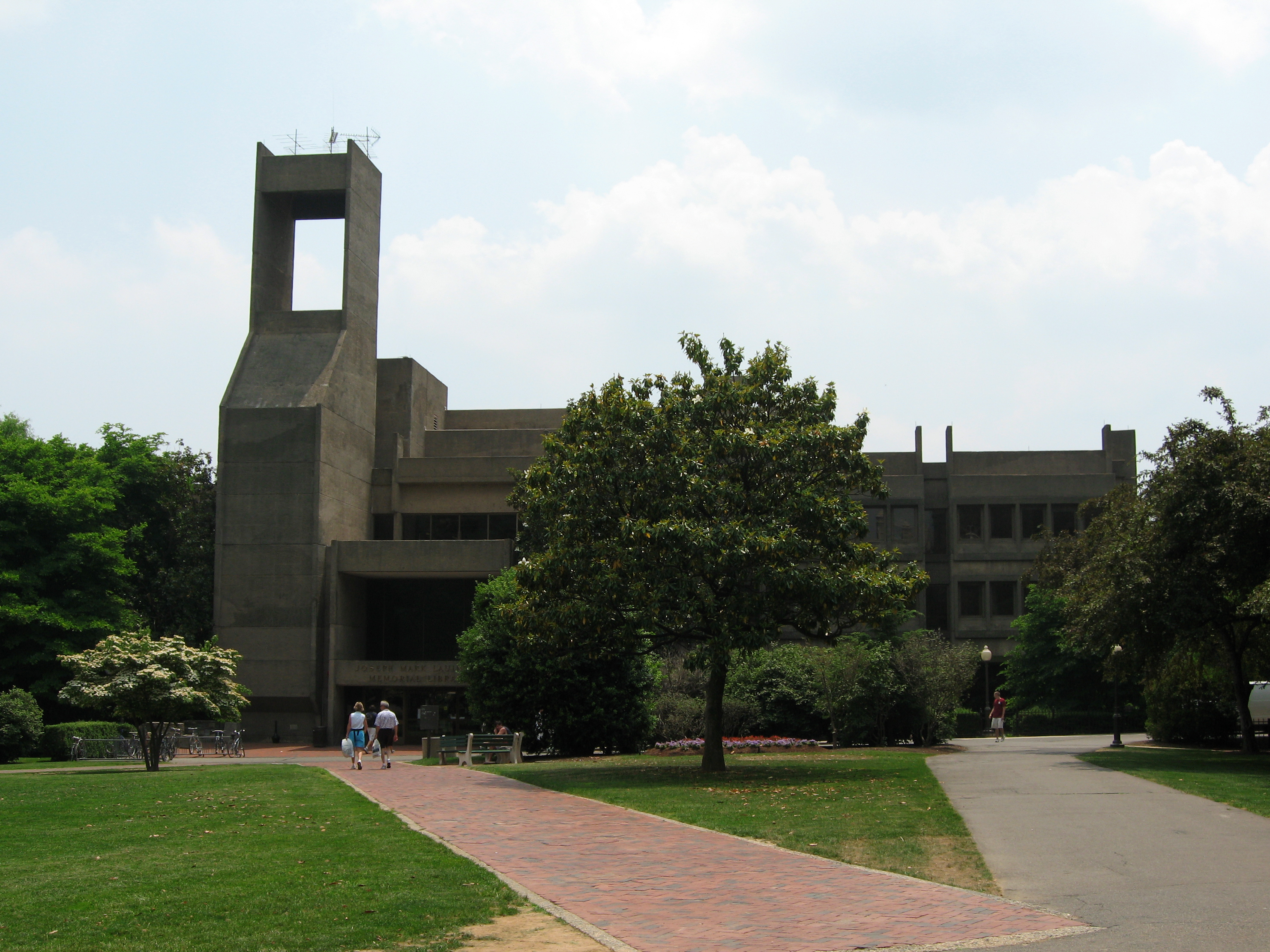
- Lauinger Library is the main library of Georgetown University
- 38.90653341502664°N 77.07148801224758°W
- Location: Washington, D.C., United States
- Type: Academic library
- Established: 1789
- Branches: 7 buildings, 11 libraries

Collection
- Size: 3.5 million printed items, including 1.25 million e-books, with most in Lauinger Library

Other information
- Dean: Alexia Hudson-Ward
- Parent organization: Georgetown University
- Website: https://www.library.georgetown.edu/

The Georgetown University Library is the library system of Georgetown University in Washington, D.C. The library's holdings now contain approximately 3.5 million volumes housed in seven university buildings across 11 separate collections.

== History ==
The Georgetown University Library was created with a donation of over 100 volumes of books in 1796 by Louis William Valentine Dubourg, the third President of Georgetown College.

Initially, the library was located entirely within one room of now-demolished Old South. The library system would continue to grow throughout the 1800s, and in 1891 it moved to Riggs Library, in the south pavilion of Healy Hall. The library system by the 1960s consolidated into one unified system, with the smaller "seminar libraries" for individual schools moving their collections to Riggs Library (or Blommer Science Library, which opened for the sciences and mathematics departments in 1962). The biggest addition to the library was the opening of Lauinger Library in 1970, with the university collection growing to over 2.3 million volumes on the Main Campus alone.

== Facilities ==
=== Lauinger Library ===
The library's largest building, the Joseph Mark Lauinger Memorial Library, opened in 1970, replacing Riggs Library as the primary library location. It is located on Georgetown's main campus and holds the majority of the library system's collections.

=== Blommer Science Library ===
Blommer Science Library is located on the third floor of the Reiss Science Building on Georgetown's main campus. The library opened in 1962 and stores materials for undergraduate and graduate study in biology, chemistry, computer science, mathematics, and physics.

The library was planned to be permanently closed in 2019 as part of broader renovations to the building, but ultimately remained open.

=== Capitol Campus Library ===
The Capitol Campus Library opened in August 2025 as part of the relocation of the School of Continuing Studies to 111 Massachusetts Avenue NW. It is located in a single room on the fourth floor of the building, mostly providing information and research services for Capitol Campus academic programs (excluding the Georgetown University Law Center). The library also offers course reserve materials and serves as a pickup location for materials from other libraries.

Prior to August 2025, the School of Continuing Studies had its own library in its previous building located at 640 Massachusetts Avenue NW, known as the Downtown Campus Library.

=== Bioethics Research Library ===
The Bioethics Research Library opened on the first floor of Healy Hall in 1902 as the Hirst Library and Reading Room, functioning as an undergraduate library. It would later house the School of Foreign Service Library and then the Periodicals Room for Riggs Library. The library reopened in 1973 as the National Reference Center for Bioethics Literature as a wing of the Kennedy Institute of Ethics, which is located on the fourth floor of Healy Hall. The library obtained its current name in 2010.

=== Woodstock Theological Library ===
The Woodstock Theological Library is one of the oldest Catholic theological libraries in the United States, having been founded in 1869. The library moved to Georgetown in 1974, accompanying the Woodstock Theological Center, which closed in 2013, although the library collection remains in existence.

=== Dahlgren Memorial Library ===
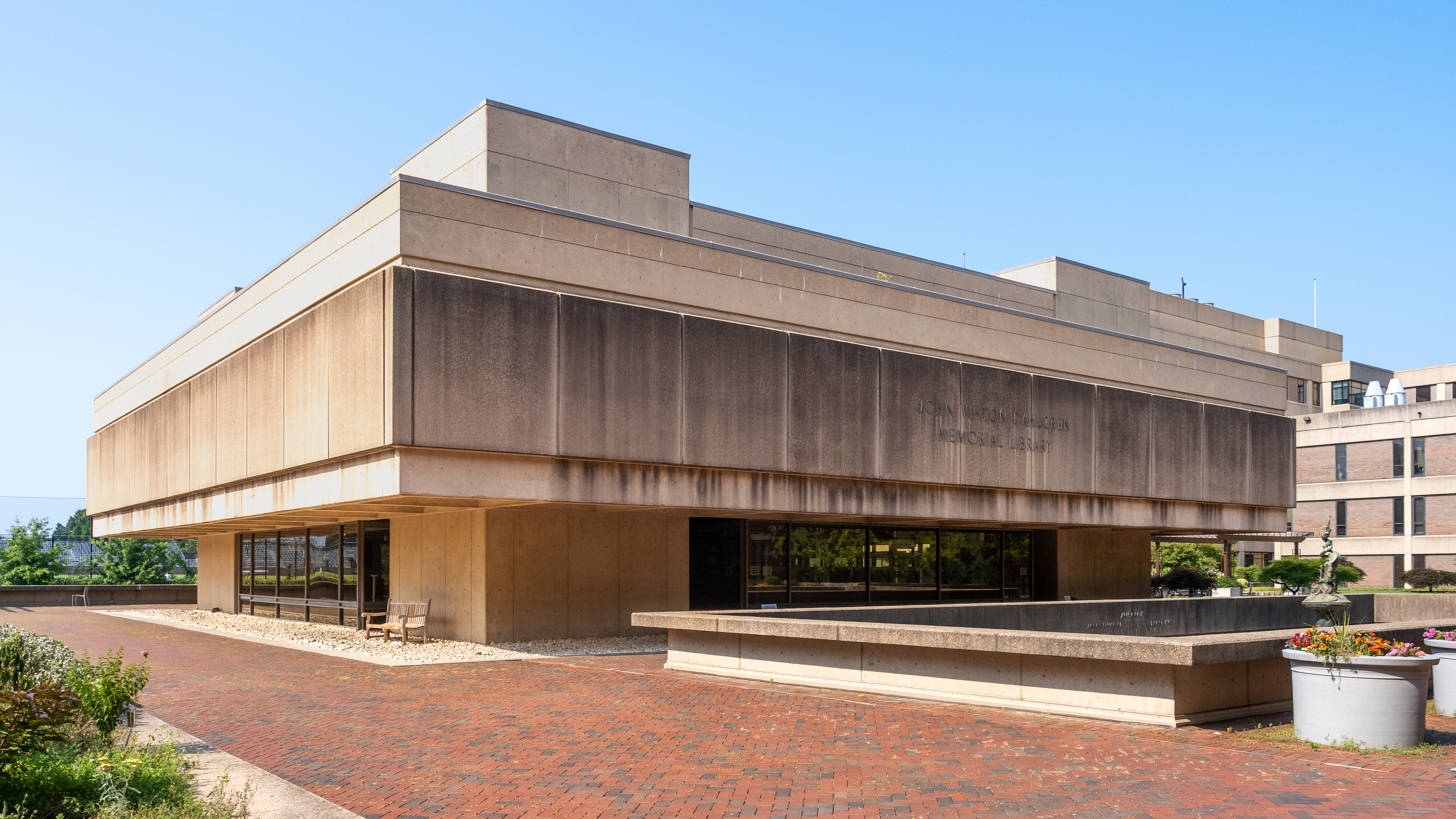
Dahlgren Memorial Library

Dahlgren Memorial Library provides information and digital services and resources to support faculty, staff, and students of the Georgetown University Medical Center. The building was dedicated in January 1971 for John Vinton Dahlgren.

From 1930 to 1971, the library was located in the adjacent Medical-Dental Building. From 1912 to 1930, it was located at the original site of the Georgetown University School of Medicine in Downtown D.C..

=== Riggs Memorial Library ===
Riggs Memorial Library served as the main library of Georgetown between 1891 and 1970, until it was replaced by Lauinger Library. The library is located on the third floor of Healy Hall and is one of the few existing cast-iron libraries in the country. Today, it is administered by the Georgetown University Office of the President mostly as an event space, though it continues to serve its original purpose of storing books.

=== Edward Bennett Williams Law Library ===
The Williams Law Library is the main library of the Georgetown University Law Center and opened in 1989. The library was featured in the 1993 film The Pelican Brief.

=== John Wolff International and Comparative Law Library ===
The Wolff International and Comparative Law Library is housed separately from the Williams Law Library in the Hotung International Law Center Building. Its collection focuses on primary and secondary foreign sources, with materials from Australia, Canada, France, Germany, Great Britain, Ireland, Mexico, New Zealand, Scotland, and South Africa, and other nations. It also has extensive documents from international organizations including the Permanent Court of International Justice, the League of Nations, the United Nations, European Union, International Court of Justice, World Trade Organization, GATT, and the Council of Europe.

=== Georgetown University School of Foreign Service in Qatar Library ===
The James Reardon-Anderson Library (formerly SFS-Q Library) offers online access to more than 2 million scholarly resources and an intercampus loans service with Georgetown's library services in Washington DC. There is also an interlibrary loan services agreement with other universities on the Education City campus and with Qatar University. The Library houses over 90,000 books, and over 6,000 multimedia items. The Library space is open to the public. As of 2016, over 650,000 members of the GU-Q community and the general public have visited the library since 2005.

== Collaborations with other library systems ==
Georgetown is part of the Washington Research Library Consortium, a joint initiative by nine universities in the District of Columbia which coordinates access and resources between the nine library systems. Members may borrow books from other libraries in the system and they share off-site storage, among other initiatives.
