= Housing at Georgetown University =

Aspect of Georgetown University residential life

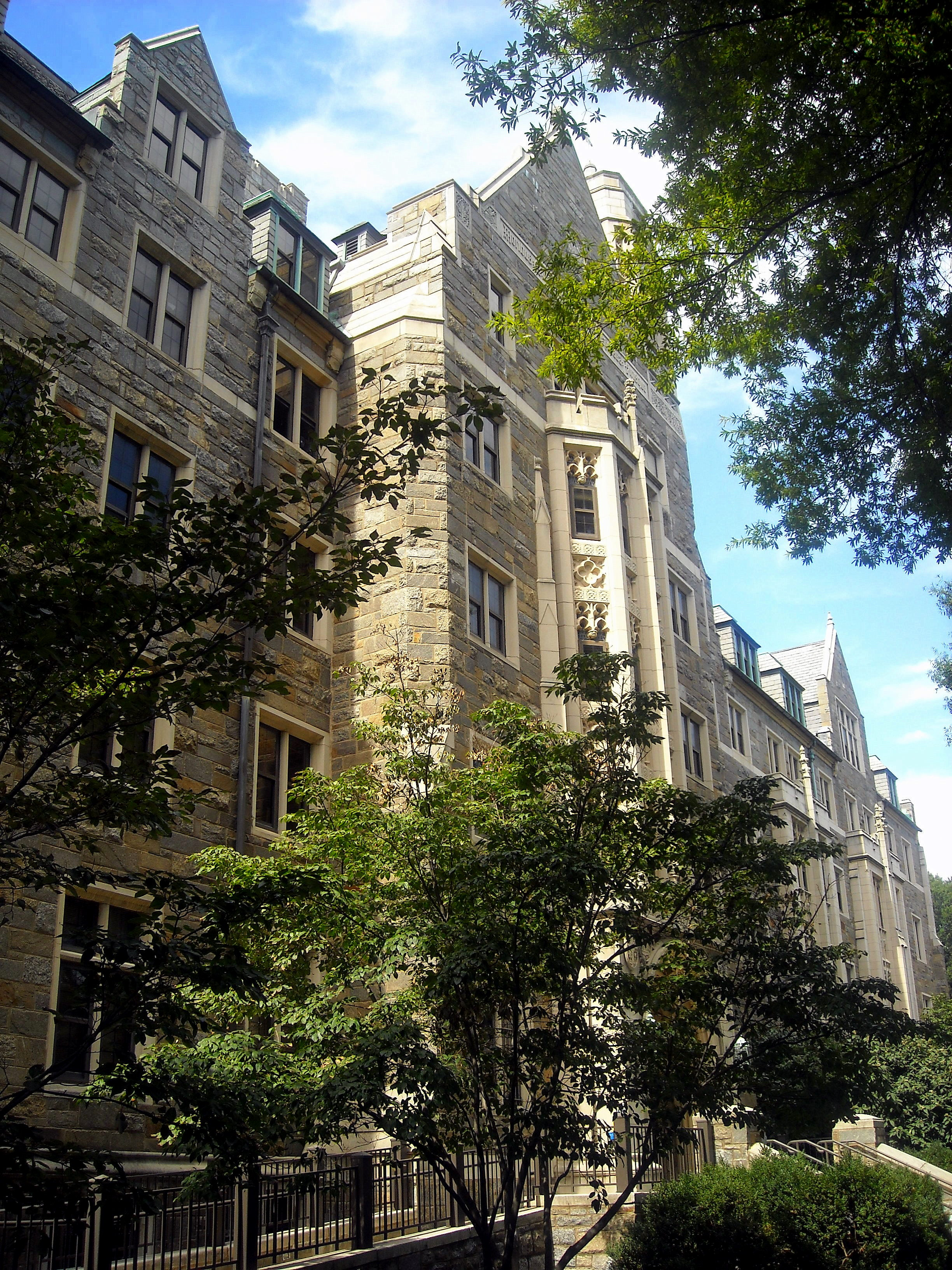
Copley Hall is a first-year dormitory.

Housing at Georgetown University consists of 14 residence halls at the main campus and a law center campus. Housing on Georgetown's main campus is divided between "halls," usually more traditional dormitories, and "villages", usually less traditional apartment complexes. In addition, Georgetown operates many townhouses in the Georgetown neighborhood, usually for second, third, and fourth-year students.

A majority of undergraduates, eighty-five percent, live on-campus. The remainder live off-campus, mostly in the Georgetown, Burleith, and Foxhall neighborhoods. On-campus housing at Georgetown is the second most expensive in the country as of 2010.

Housing is also available for on-campus graduate students at 55 H St. NW while students at the Law Center are accommodated at the Gewirz Student Center.

== First-year housing ==
=== Copley Hall ===
Copley Hall is one of the oldest dorms on Georgetown's campus, having been built in 1932. Named for Thomas Copley S.J., it is a neo-Gothic stone building located next to Healy Hall, across from the front gates and in front of similarly named Copley Lawn, a popular site for outdoor events. Copley Hall features suite-style apartments (two double occupancy rooms with an adjoining bathroom) on its five floors, with residency options for Georgetown's basketball team as well as rooms for physically disabled students. Copley Hall also contains a number of religious spaces, including St. William's Chapel, the Muslim Prayer Room, and the Copley Crypt Chapel of the North American Martyrs, as well as Copley Formal Lounge, a formal event location.

=== Darnall Hall ===
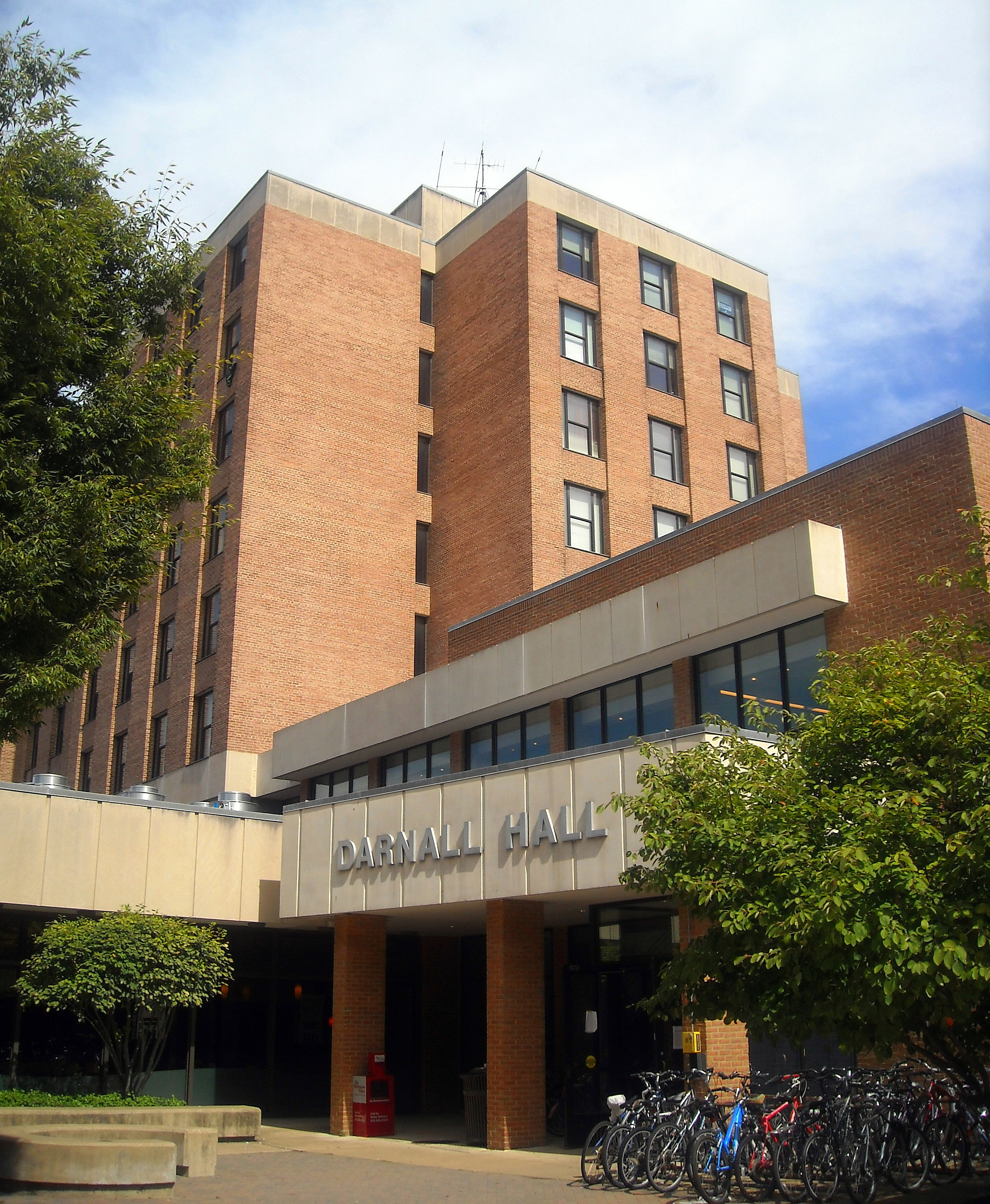
Darnall Hall

Darnall Hall provides housing for first-year students. It was built as a women-only dorm, and together with its male counterpart, Harbin Hall, cost $5.6 million. At the time Darnall opened in 1965, women were only in the school of Nursing, the School of Foreign Service and the Institute of Languages and Linguistics. It is the only Georgetown dormitory named for a woman, Eleanor Darnall, who was the mother of Georgetown University founder John Carroll and an early supporter of Catholic education in America. Darnall is one of two Georgetown dormitories located within ANC District 2E04. As a result, it has been the focus of efforts to recruit Georgetown students to run for election to this District of Columbia position.

Darnall Hall was the home of one of two cafeterias on campus operated until Darnall Café was shut down after the 2004-2005 academic year. Restaurateur C.W. Chon negotiated a lease for the former cafeteria space, which reopened as a sit-down restaurant in April 2008 named Epicurean. Chon had been chosen in 2006 based on his success with other Washington, D.C. establishments.

Darnall was last renovated in 1996. There are six floors with double-occupancy rooms, two common bathrooms, and a common room with a kitchen. The average room is 16.5 feet by 10.5 feet. In addition, the building houses the offices of Institutional Diversity, Equity and Affirmative Action, Auxiliary Services, Counseling and Psychiatric Services, GOCard Services, and the Student Health Center.

=== Harbin Hall ===
Harbin Hall was opened in 1965 and is a residence hall for first-year students. Its name comes from George F. Harbin, a professor at Georgetown. It underwent renovations in 2000, opening in the fall to new students. Each floor of Harbin Hall consists of three sections, each of which hold a set of eight rooms surrounding a single-sex bathroom. Most rooms house two students with a few triple rooms throughout the building. The majority of the floors are co-ed. The west-facing side of Harbin hall boasts a clear view of Cooper Field and is located right in the center of the Georgetown campus.

Former President Bill Clinton was a resident of Harbin Hall during his undergraduate career at Georgetown.

=== New South Hall ===
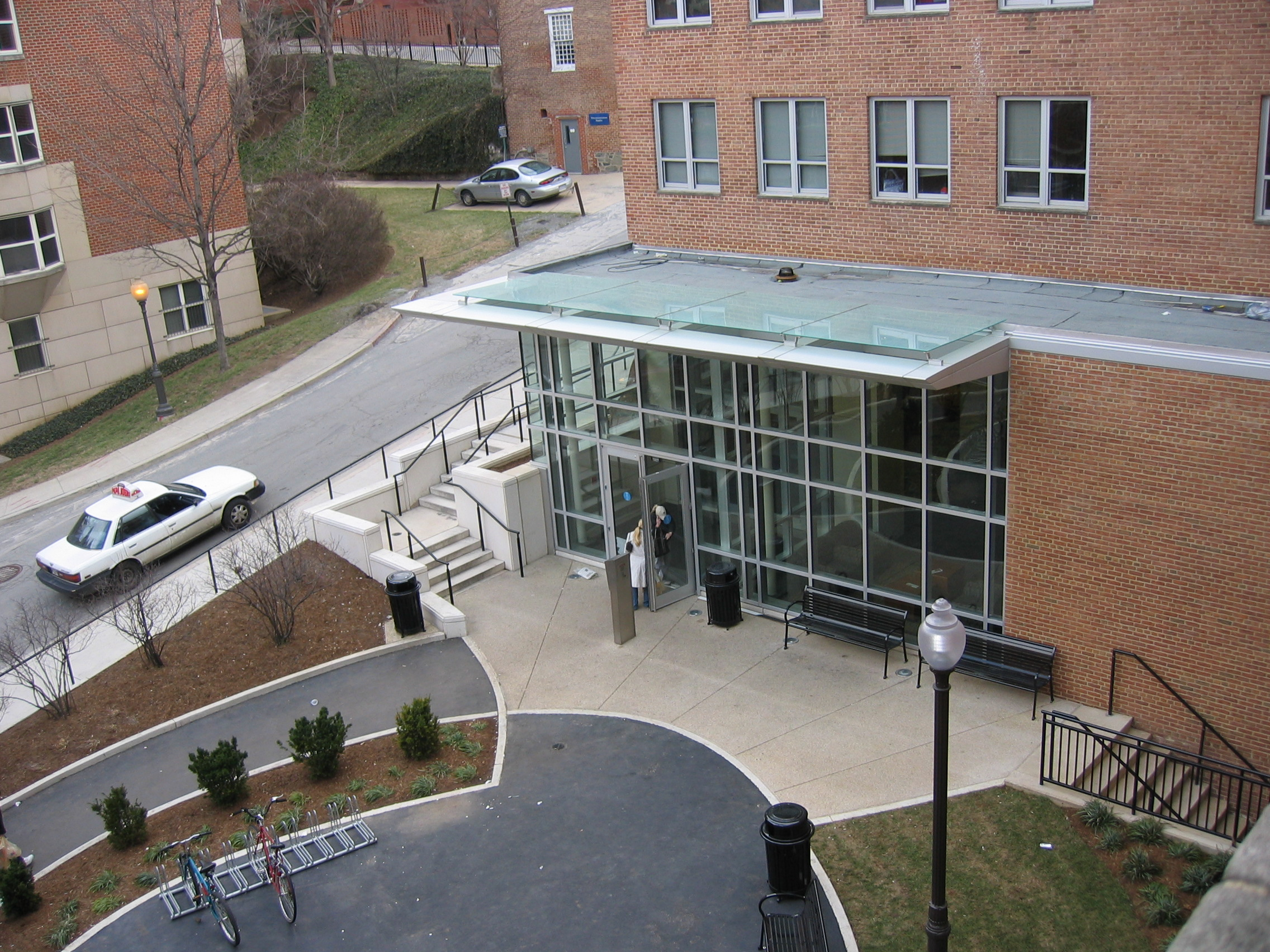
New entry to New South created in 2004, located at 38°54′23″N 77°4′27″W

New South Hall is a first-year student dorm. It opened in 1959, and its name is due to its placement as the southernmost building on the main campus at the time of its completion. The building was renovated in 2004.

The name reflects the oldest Georgetown building, which had been called "Old South", and was located near New South's location. Old South was replaced by Ryan Hall in 1903. When New South was completed in September 1959, it was the southernmost building on campus. Money for the dormitory was made available by the federal government largely because of the 1957 launch of Sputnik 1, which galvanized the government to fund educational initiatives. However this required that a "no-frills" building be built. Since then, renovation to the exterior has been prevented by the United States Commission of Fine Arts, which considers it a "part of the historic skyline of Georgetown". Its monolithic appearance has been criticized by many from students to President Lyndon B. Johnson. In addition to student housing, New South houses the office of the University Architect, University Facilities, Facilities Planning, and the MSB Technology Center.

New South's cafeteria was completed in February 1960, and at the time was the "biggest non-military food service in the Washington area." In 2003 the dining hall was closed and replaced by neighboring Leo J. O'Donovan, S.J. Dining Hall. In 2004, the building underwent a $21 million interior renovation, and a new entrance was created. The old cafeteria space was converted into room for dance classes called "Deep South", first opened in February 2004, though many proposals for its use were made. The dormitory was formally rededicated in November 2004. Amenities added during renovations were named as the reason why Georgetown was listed in the top ten priciest college dormitories according to U.S. News & World Report.

The four floors are co-ed and contain roughly one-hundred students, and each double room in New South contains a sink. Each floor has two resident assistants and a Chaplain-in-Residence. The dormitory has a certain reputation, due in part to its long corridors, of being more social but also being prone to vandalism. However, New South was recognized as the Georgetown Hall of the Year for the 2005–2006 academic year and recognized by The Voice as the Best Dorm to Live in 2006-2007. Former university president John J. DeGioia lived in New South while a student.

== Upperclassman housing ==
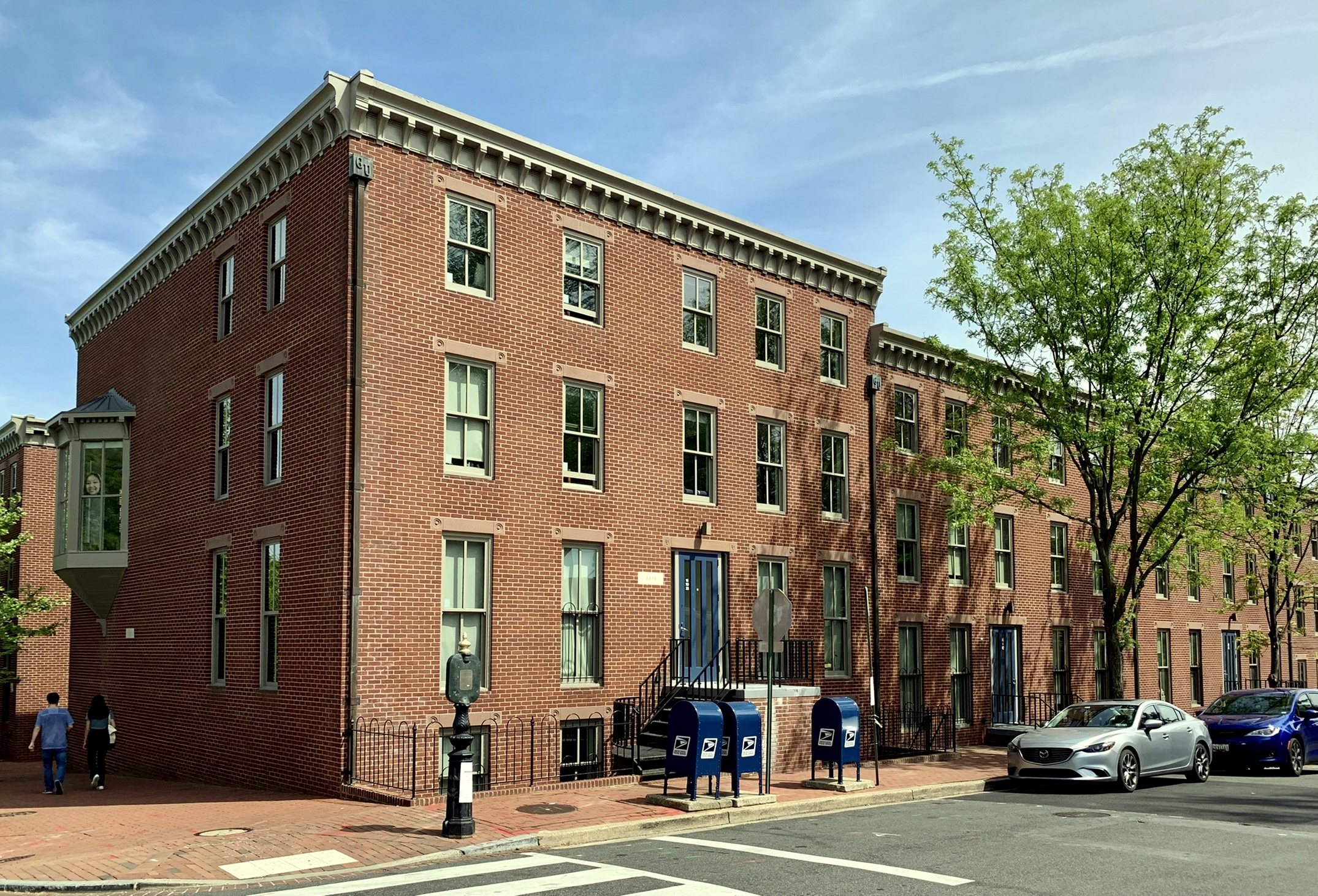
Alumni Square

=== Arrupe Hall ===
Pedro Arrupe, S.J. Hall, named after the 28th Jesuit Superior General, is a suite-style dormitory completed 2016. It is located on a triangular plot of land between Henle Village, Reiss Science Building, and the Intercultural Center. It houses primarily sophomores and juniors. The eight-story building blends the brick architecture of its adjacent buildings and the stone facades common to the nearby neo-gothic portion of campus.

=== Alumni Square ===
Alumni Square (originally named Village B) is located just outside the University's main gates. The complex was completed in 1980, and comprises four buildings: Groves, Beh, McBride and McCahill, named after Georgetown alumni. The complex is constructed around a grassy courtyard with shade trees, park benches and a brick walkway from O Street to N Street.

=== Ida Ryan & Isaac Hawkins Hall ===
Ida Ryan & Isaac Hawkins Hall is more commonly known as JesRes, not to be confused with Wolfington Hall, which houses Georgetown's Jesuit community. JesRes is an on-campus, five-floor complex for upperclass students, consisting of a number of housing options, ranging from 4 person semi-suite style rooms to a 9 person apartment. JesRes can be located directly behind Healy Hall, with access to the first floor along Library Walk just in front of Village A or access to the second floor via Dahlgren Quad.

=== LXR Hall ===
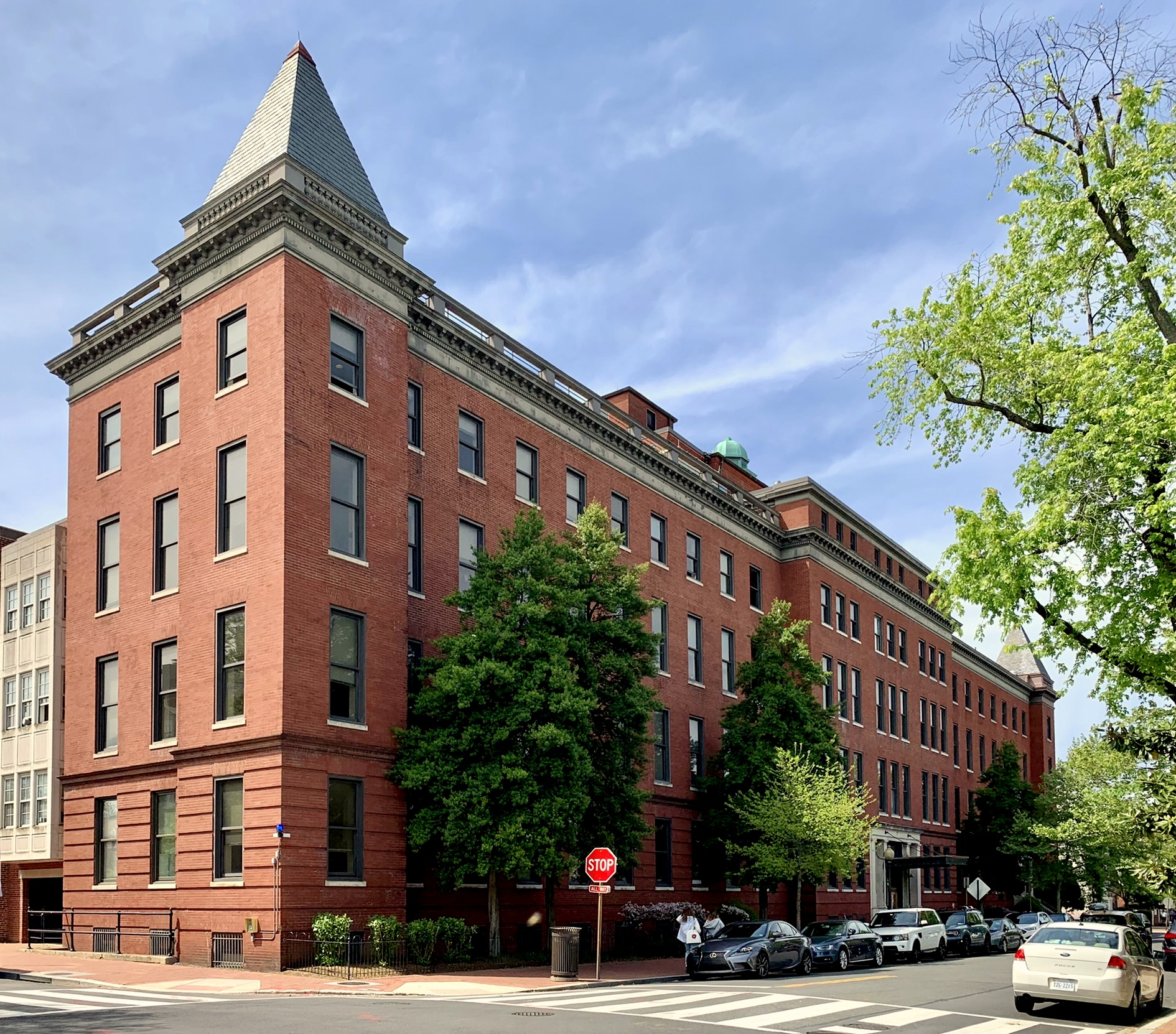
LXR Hall was built in 1925 as an expansion of Georgetown University Hospital's original building.

LXR Hall is an off-campus dorm on 35th Street, between N St and Prospect St, and along with Nevils Hall and the Walsh academic building, makes up Georgetown's East Campus. Three previously separate dorms (Loyola, Xavier, and Ryder), were renovated and connected into a single 6-floor building, named after all three.

=== Kennedy, McCarthy and Reynolds Halls ===
These buildings comprise the Southwest Quad, which was completed in 2003.

=== Nevils ===
Nevils is an upperclass dorm located next to LXR. It is one of the most sought after residencies to live in.

=== Village A ===
Village A is an upperclass apartment complex located on the south side of campus, between Lauinger Library and New South Hall, which features townhouse apartment buildings connected via a series of catwalks. Village A rooftop apartments open onto large decks and patios with views of the Potomac, downtown Washington, and Rosslyn, VA; other apartments have balconies with similar views.

=== Village C ===
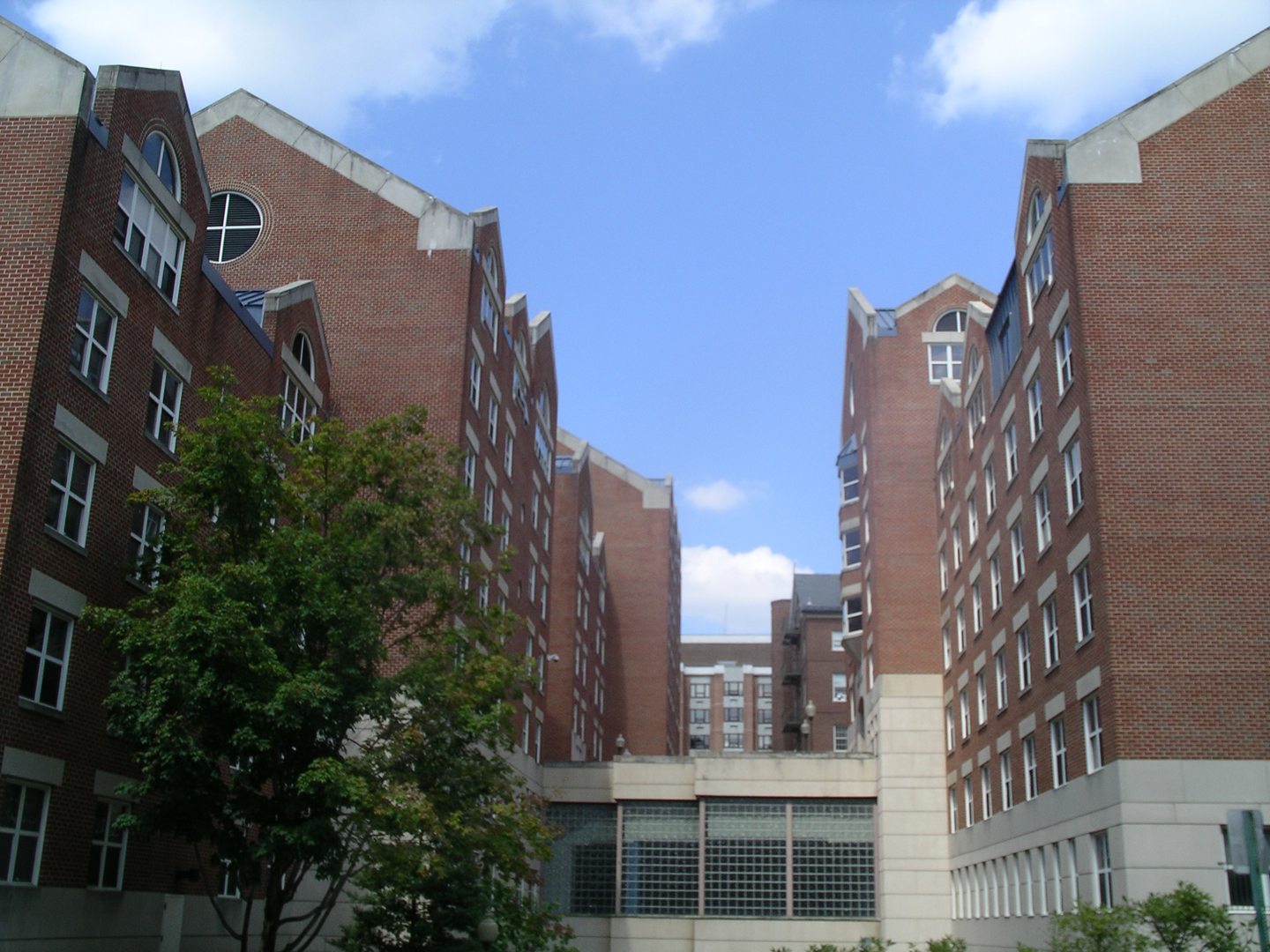
Village C is divided between East (right) and West (left) wings.

Village C opened in 1986 and has an East and West wing. The West wing is split into an X and Y wing. Every room in Village C has its own bathroom. Village C is primarily a sophomore dorm, but first-years are sometimes placed there as well when there is no room in the designated first-year dorms.

=== University townhouses ===
While most townhouses inhabited by Georgetown students are not university-owned, a handful of them are. Many university-owned townhouses, such as "Brown House" on N Street, have become popular locations for social events.

== Graduate housing ==
Beginning with the Fall 2022 semester, Georgetown opens a Graduate Housing complex at 55 H St., which is 30 minute from the main campus via the Georgetown University Transportation Shuttle (GUTS).

== Law school housing ==
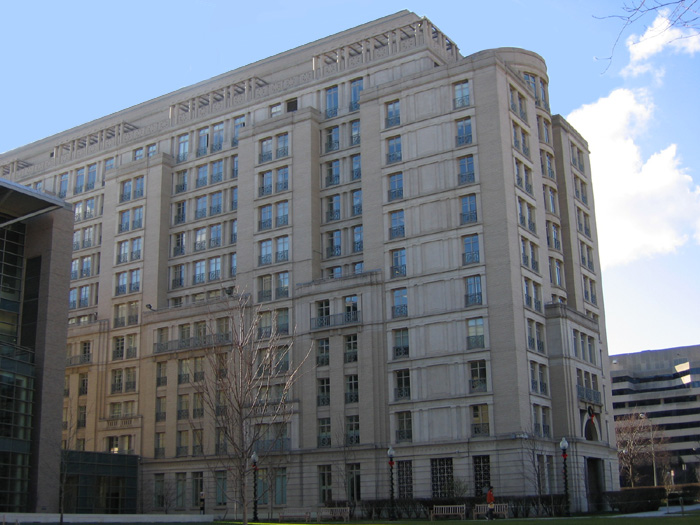
The Gewirz Student Center is the only housing on the Law Center campus.

=== Gewirz Student Center ===
The Gewirz Student Center is a furnished apartment-style housing complex open to all law students primarily lived in by first-year and LLM law students, housing approximately 300 people. It has eight floor plans for rooms, lounge areas, a mock trial room, a health center, a ballroom, and is a short, indoor walk to the Law Center's gym facilities, Subway, one classroom and office building, and Hotung Library.

== Former housing ==
=== Alban Towers ===
Georgetown purchased the historic Alban Towers on Massachusetts Avenue in 1973 to use as student housing. After this time, the property fell into a state of disrepair, and the university sold it in 1999.

=== Halcyon House ===
In the early 1960s, the university bought the Halcyon House in the Georgetown neighborhood. This building was used to house students until it was sold in 1966.

=== Healy Hall ===
Healy Hall was used, among other things, as a dormitory upon its completion in 1879.

=== Henle Village ===
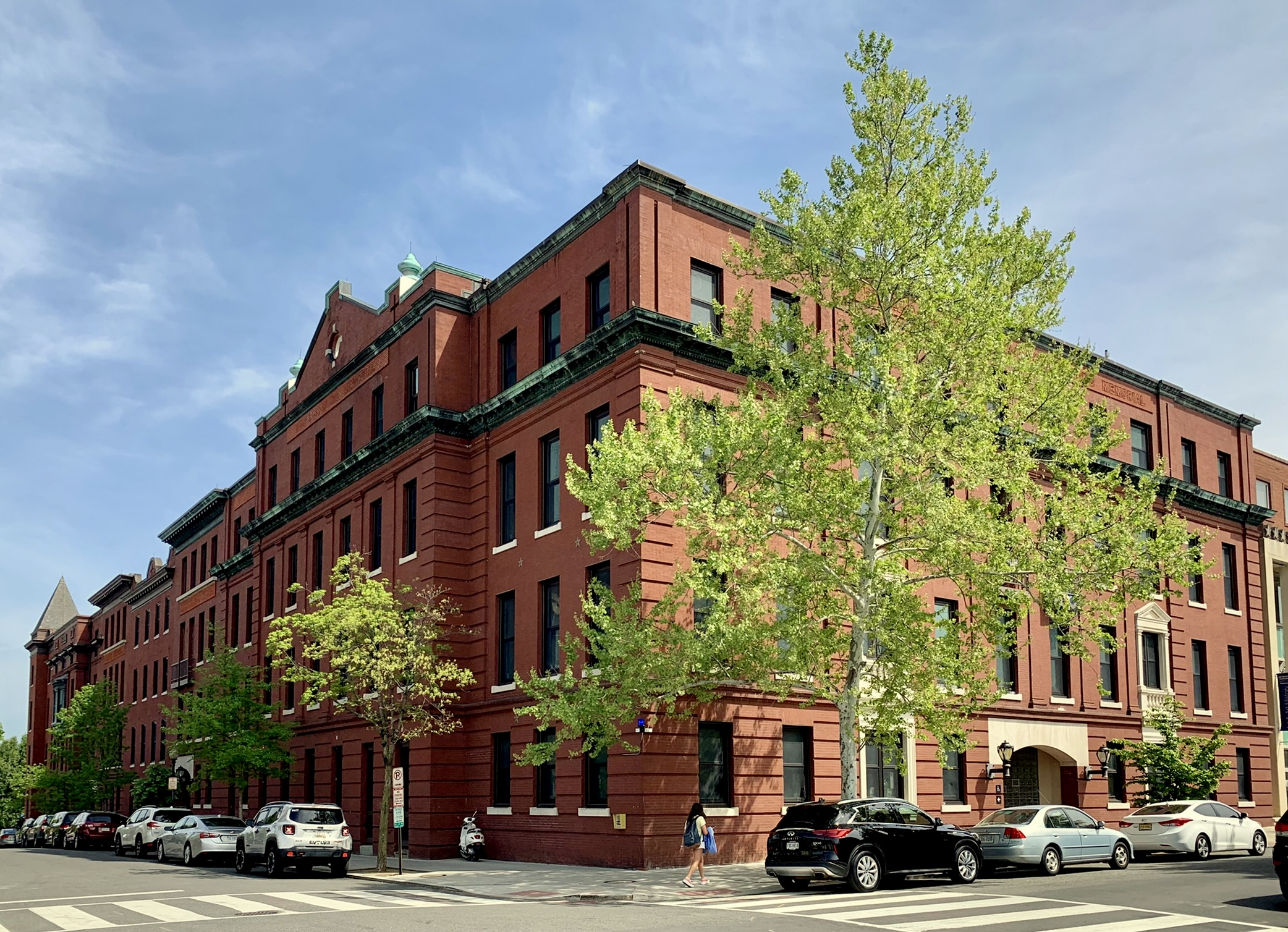
Nevils Hall was built in 1898 as the original Georgetown University Hospital

Henle Village is an on-campus apartment complex for upperclass students, consisting of red brick buildings of three or four floors. Henle Village has four or five-person apartment which contain kitchens, showers, and bathrooms in each apartment. Henle Village is known for its open spaces (which allow outdoor events and grilling). although it is also known for problems with mold and rat infestations. Henle Village opened in 1977 and is named after former Georgetown President Robert J. Henle, S.J.

=== Old North ===
Old North was built in 1797 and originally housed students, in addition to holding classrooms and a chapel. In the twentieth century, Old North again served as a dormitory for students until 1981.
