= List of Georgetown University buildings =

This is a list of buildings on Georgetown University campuses. Georgetown University's undergraduate campus and the medical school campus, together comprising the main campus, and the Law Center campus, are located within Washington, D.C. The Main Campus is located in Georgetown, Washington, D.C. between Canal Road, P Street, and Reservoir Road. The Law Center campus is located in downtown DC on New Jersey Avenue, near Union Station.

== List of buildings ==
Georgetown University buildings
Name	Sub-buildings	Image	Built	Campus	Function	Notes	Ref.
Car Barn			1895–1897	East	Academic	Once the Capital Traction Company trolley car depot	
Davis Performing Arts Center	Gonda Theater		2003–2005	Main	Academic	Expansion of 1906 Ryan Gymnasium. Named for Royden B. Davis	
Healy Hall	Gaston Hall, Riggs Library		1877–1879	Main	Academic	Interior work continued for 22 years after completion. Listed as National Historic Landmark	
Bunn Intercultural Center			1982	Main	Academic	Named after Edward B. Bunn	
Leavey Center			1968	Main	Administrative	Serves as students' union	
Healey Family Student Center	Bulldog Tavern		2014	Main	Recreation	Named for Thomas J. Healey, class of 1964, and family members	
Maguire Hall			1854–1855	Main	Academic	Replaced Old South	
Jesuit Community Cemetery			1808	Main	Religious	Moved with the building of Maguire Hall in 1854	
Bernard P. McDonough Hall			1971	Law	Academic		
Astronomical Observatory			1843–1844	Main	Academic	Listed on the National Register of Historic Places. Used in 1846 to determine coordinates of Washington, D.C.	
Reiss Science Building	Blommer Science Library		1962–1963	Main	Academic		
Ryan Hall			1903	Main	Administrative	Architect: Albert Olszewski Von Herbulis	
St. Mary's Hall			1954	Main	Academic	Renovated in 2002	
Edmund A. Walsh Building	Walsh Black Box Theatre		1958	East	Academic	Named for Edmund A. Walsh, founder of the School of Foreign Service	
White-Gravenor Hall			1932–1933	Main	Academic	Named for Andrew White and John Gravenor Architect: Emile G. Perrot	
Alumni Square (Village B)	Groves, Beh, McBride, and McCahill		1983	East	Residential		
Copley Hall	Copley Formal Lounge		1930–1932	Main	Residential	Named for Thomas Copley	
Darnall Hall			1964–1965	Main	Residential	Renovated in 1996	
Gewirz Student Center			1993	Law	Residential		
Harbin Hall			1965	Main	Residential	Renovated in 2000	
LXR Hall	Loyola Hall, Ryder Hall, Xavier Hall			East	Residential	Connected into single building in 1994	
Nevils Hall	Kober, Lisner, Nordhoff, Riggs			East	Residential	Served as Georgetown University Hospital from 1900 to the early 1930s	
New South Hall			1957–1959	Main	Residential	Renovated in 2004.	
Kennedy Hall			2001–2003	Main	Residential	Part of the Southwest Quadrangle	
McCarthy Hall	McShain Lounge		2001–2003	Main	Residential	Part of the Southwest Quadrangle	
Reynolds Family Hall			2001–2003	Main	Residential	Part of the Southwest Quadrangle	
Village A			1979	Main	Residential	Level 4 known as "the rooftops"	
Village C	Village C East, Village C West		1987	Main	Residential	Divided into East and West wings	
Pedro Arrupe, S.J. Hall			2016	Main	Residential		
Wolfington Hall Jesuit Residence			2001–2003	Main	Residential		
Dahlgren Memorial Library			1970	Medical	Library	Named for John Vinton Dahlgren	
Edward Bennett Williams Law Library			1989	Law	Library	Named for Edward Bennett Williams	
Lauinger Library			1969–1970	Main	Library		
Basic Science Building			1972	Medical	Academic		
Building D				Medical	Administrative		
Medical and Dental Building	St. Ignatius Chapel		1930	Medical	Academic		
Verstandig Pavilion			2023	Medical	Hospital		
Medical and Dental Annex				Medical	Academic		
Concentrated Care Center			1976	Medical	Hospital		
Gorman Building				Medical	Hospital		
Marcus Bles Building			1972	Medical	Hospital		
Pasquerilla Healthcare Center			1988	Medical	Hospital		
Lombardi Comprehensive Cancer Center			1982	Medical	Hospital	Named for Vince Lombardi	
New Research Building			1995	Medical	Hospital		
Pre-Clinical Science Building			1972	Medical	Academic		
Cooper Field				Main	Athletic	Previously known as Multi-Sport Field	
Sport and Fitness Center			2005	Law	Athletic		
Kehoe Field	North Kehoe Field		1980	Main	Athletic		
McDonough Gymnasium			1950–1951	Main	Athletic	Used for Dwight D. Eisenhower's inaugural ball	
Yates Field House			1979	Main	Athletic		
John R. Thompson Jr. Intercollegiate Athletic Center			2014–2016	Main	Athletic	Named for former basketball coach John Thompson	
Chapel of St. Thomas More				Law	Religious		
Copley Crypt Chapel of the North American Martyrs			1930–1932	Main	Religious		
Dahlgren Chapel of the Sacred Heart			1892–1893	Main	Religious		
Servant of God Sister Thea Bowman Chapel of St. William			1930–1932	Main	Religious	Located off of the first floor of Copley Hall	
Eric E. Hotung International Law Center			2005	Law	Administrative	Named for Eric Edward Hotung, Hong Kong businessman and philanthropist	
Gervase Building			1830–1848	Main	Administrative		
Heating and Cooling Plant			1978	Main	Administrative		
Anne Marie Becraft Hall (formerly McSherry Hall)			1792	Main	Administrative	The oldest building currently on campus	
Mortara Center For International Studies			2003	East	Administrative		
Isaac Hawkins Hall (previously Mulledy Hall)			1830–1833	Main	Administrative	Originally named for Thomas Mulledy	
Rafik B. Hariri Building			2006–2009	Main	Academic		
New North	McNeir Auditorium		1925	Main	Administrative	Formerly a dormitory	
North and South Gatehouses			1913	Main	Administrative	Replaced 1844 gatehouses	
Old North			1794–1795	Main	Academic	Oldest academic building on campus. Formerly a dormitory.	
Poulton Hall	Stage III Theater		1947	East	Administrative	Named for Ferdinand Poulton	
Reed Alumni Residence				East	Alumni	Named for James Patrick Reed in 1993	
Robert and Bernice Wagner Alumni House	Institute for the Study of Diplomacy		1998–2005	East	Alumni		
Leo J. O'Donovan Dining Hall			2001–2003	Main	Dining	Named for Leo J. O'Donovan	
Regents Hall			2012	Main	Academic	Named for and dedicated to the Board of Regents of Georgetown University	
Liberal Arts and Science Building			2005	Qatar	Academic	Part of Education City	
Humanitarium Building			2008–2011	Qatar	Academic	Part of Education City	
School of Continuing Studies Building			2013	Downtown	Academic		
Villa Le Balze			1911–1914	Fiesole	Academic	Gifted to Georgetown University in 1979	
McGhee Center for Eastern Mediterranean Studies			c. 1835	Alanya	Academic	Gifted to Georgetown University in 1989	
55 H St. Graduate Housing			2020–2022	Downtown	Residential		

== Future buildings ==
- Boathouse, awaiting completion of city environmental survey.
- New Henle residential complex, with construction expected to run from May 2023 to July 2025.

== Former buildings ==
Former buildings
Name	Image	Years	Campus	Function	Notes	Ref.
Henle Village (original)		1976–2023	Main	Residential	Named for president Robert J. Henle	
Kober Cogan Building		1959–2018	Medical	Hospital, Residential	Named for George Kober, Medical School dean, and William N. Cogan, Dental School dean	
Old South		1791–1904	Main	Academic	Georgetown's first building. Located at the present site of Ryan Hall	
