= Old North Building =

Historic building of Georgetown University

Old North
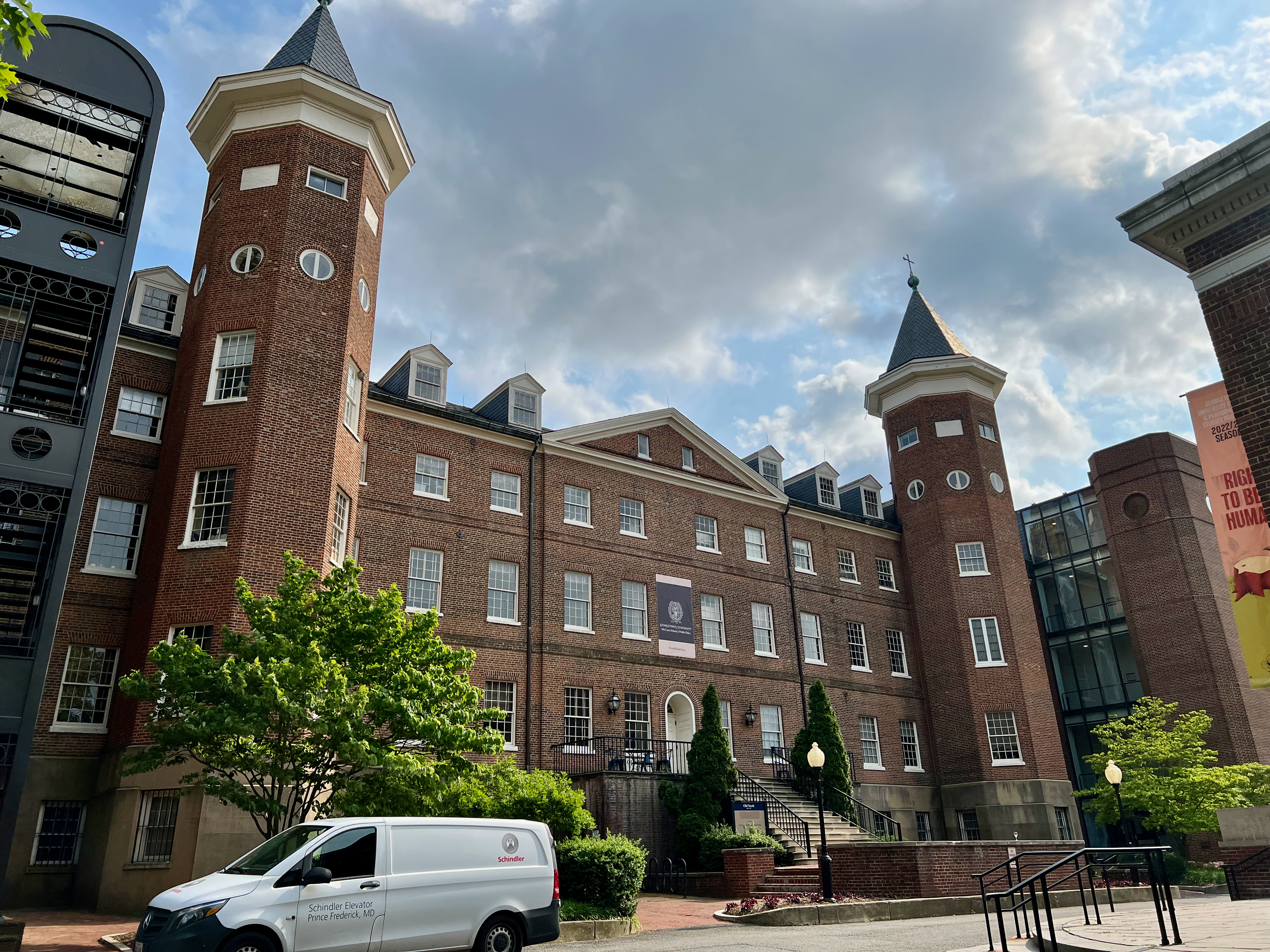
- Northern elevation in 2023

General information
- Type: Academic building
- Architectural style: Georgian
- Location: Georgetown, Washington, D.C.
- Coordinates: 38°54′27.2″N 77°4′23.7″W
- Current tenants: McCourt School of Public Policy
- Construction started: 1794; 232 years ago
- Completed: 1795; 231 years ago (exterior); 1809; 217 years ago (interior)
- Opened: 1797; 229 years ago
- Owner: Georgetown University

Dimensions
- Other dimensions: Length: 154 feet (47 m)

Technical details
- Floor count: 5
- Floor area: 25,000 sq ft (2,300 m^{2})

Design and construction
- Architect: Leonard Harbaugh
- Old North Building
- U.S. National Historic Landmark District – Contributing property
- D.C. Inventory of Historic Sites
- Location within Washington, D.C. Location within the District of Columbia Location within the United States
- Part of: Georgetown Historic District (ID67000025)

Significant dates
- Designated NHLDCP: May 28, 1967
- Designated DCIHS: November 8, 1964

The Old North Building, or simply Old North, is the oldest extant academic building on the campus of Georgetown University in Washington, D.C., and was the second major building built on the campus. To the east, the building is joined to Healy Hall and to the west, it is joined to New North, while the southern façade of the building encloses Dahlgren Chapel. Built in the Georgian style, Old North was one of the grandest buildings in Washington at the time of its completion in 1795. It served as the flagship of the university until the construction of Healy Hall. Old North currently houses the McCourt School of Public Policy.

== History ==
=== Construction and early uses ===
In the 18th century, the nascent Georgetown College, with only one building on its campus in the Georgetown neighborhood of Washington, D.C., was in continual need of additional space. Therefore, in 1792, with all of the college's facilities housed within the South Building (which was demolished in 1904), land was purchased for the construction of an additional building. Construction started in 1794 on what became known as the North Building, and work on its edifice was completed by 1795. The architect is believed to have been Leonard Harbaugh, the Baltimore-based designer of Holy Trinity Chapel. The building was modeled after Nassau Hall at Princeton University. Funding the construction of a building of its size was difficult for the school. The total cost of its initial construction exceeded £10,000, a sum significantly greater than the revenue from the Jesuits' Maryland plantations, which were funding the project. The board of directors was required to raise tuition, cut President Robert Plunkett's salary by more than half, and make some payments in the form of cows raised on campus as barter, rather than in cash. The interior of the building was not complete until 1809, with an anonymous contribution of $400. Upon completion, the 154-foot-long building increased the amount of dormitory space on campus fourfold. It also housed classrooms, a refectory, and a chapel. The building finally opened for use in 1797.

When construction of Old North was completed, many considered it "one of the grandest works in Washington, after the Capitol Building," and it became the flagship building of the university.

It was not until 1809 when, during the presidency of William Matthews, the building was totally complete. Until then, only the interior of the third floor had been finished; Matthews also added the two octagonal towers, which were an unusual addition to the Georgian-style building.

=== Civil War and beyond ===
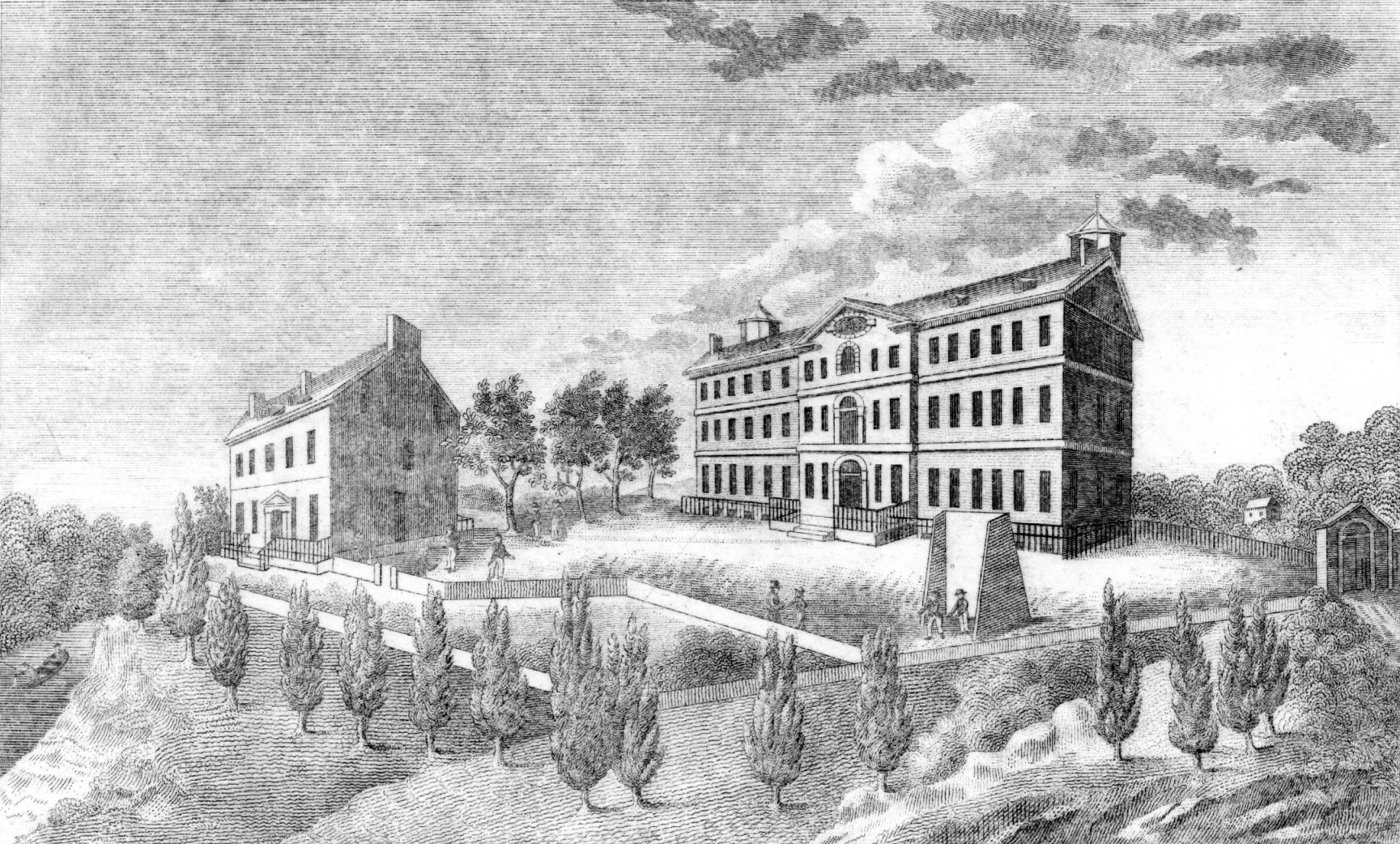
1829 depiction of Old South (left, demolished) and Old North (right)

On May 4, 1861, during the Civil War, notice was given to President John Early that the 69th Infantry Regiment of New York would be commandeering Georgetown College's campus to quarter its 1,400 soldiers. The commandeering of the college lasted until June 4 of that year. Old North was exempt from this order, and the students of the college had to quickly remove all of their belongings to the Old North Building. Likewise, Old North was exempt from another order by the Surgeon General of the Army, on August 31, 1862 to convert Georgetown's facilities into a hospital for 500 patients. This exemption was due to intervention by General Amiel Weeks Whipple, whose two sons attended the college.

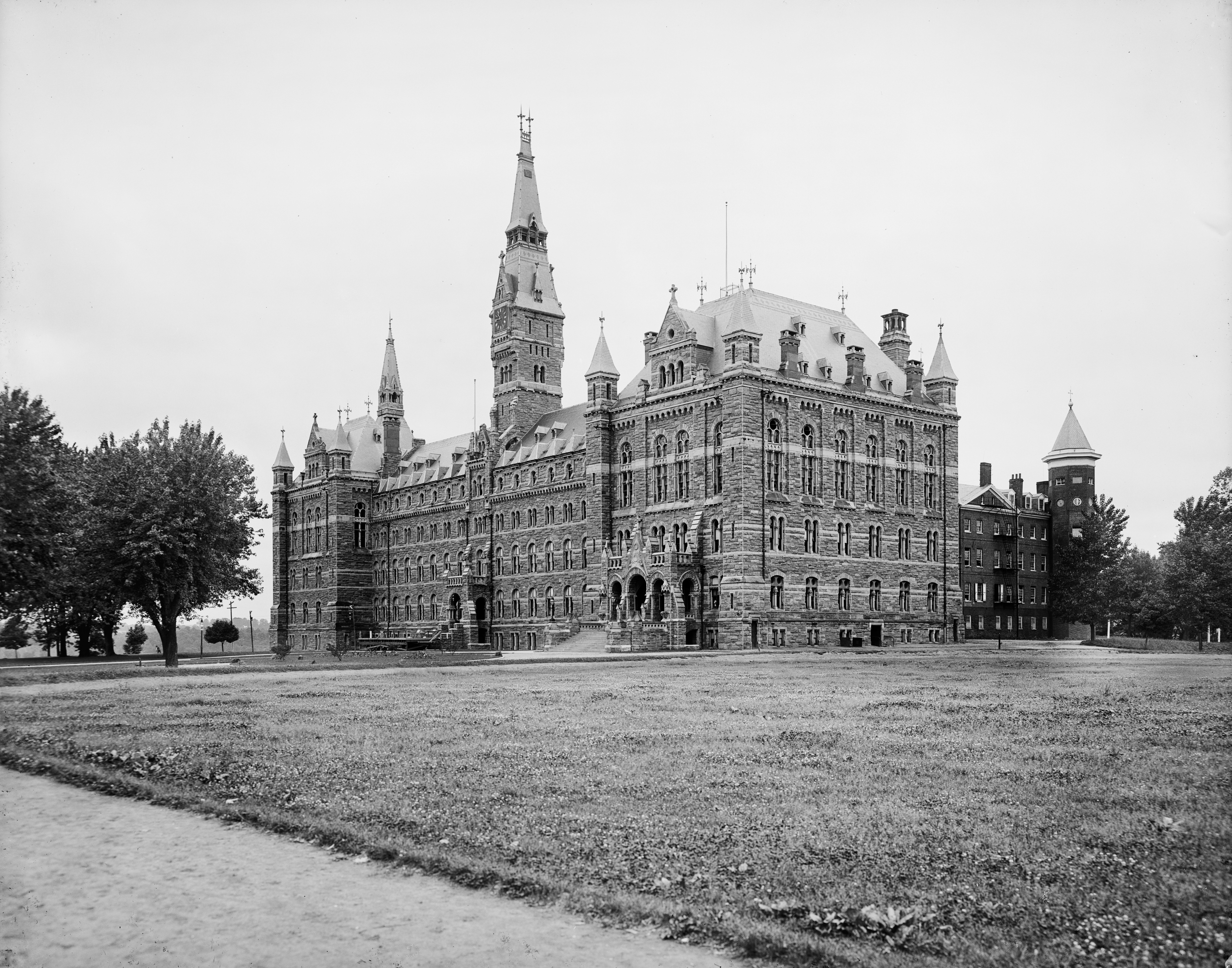
Old North (right) was overshadowed by the construction of Healy Hall

With the school growing, Georgetown embarked on the construction of Healy Hall. Architects Smithmeyer and Pelz begin drafting designs for the building, with one such plan from 1876 depicting the fourth floor of Healy Hall overlapping the footprint of Old North, suggesting that they had considered the demolition of the Old North building. When Healy Hall was completed immediately adjacent to the building, Old North lost its status as the flagship of the university and its grandeur was diminished in comparison.

An area to the south of the building was eventually enclosed by a fence, and became referred to as The Yard. The space was used by the student athletic association formed in 1891 for recreation. Over time, "The Yard" became a metonym for the athletic association, which grew to assume broader functions, eventually becoming Georgetown's student government; hence, the former name of the student government is The Yard. The courtyard between Old North and Old South—the area roughly coextensive with Dahlgren Quadrangle today—initially left the southern entrance of Old North to be at ground level. It was not until 1893 that the quadrangle was sunken and a staircase to the south entrance constructed.

=== Recent uses ===
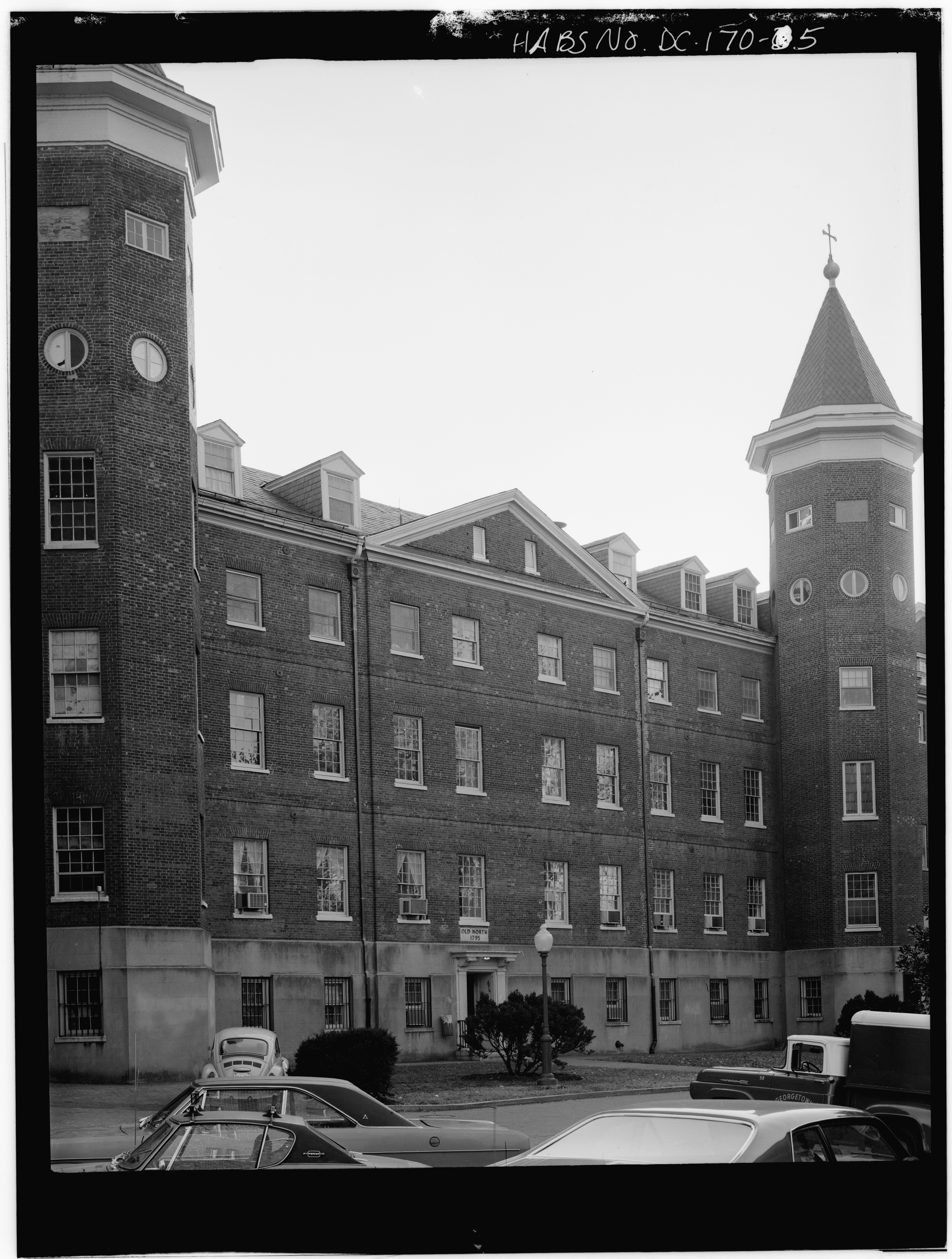
Northern elevation as seen in 1933, prior to the construction of the new entrance

In 1981, Georgetown began a two-year renovation of Old North in order to repurpose it from housing dormitories and classrooms to the new home of the School of Business Administration (the school had not yet been renamed the School of Business or, even later, the McDonough School of Business). This renovation also involved outfitting the north façade of the building with a new entrance. The building was rededicated in 1983 with a conferral of an honorary doctorate of humane letters on President Gerald Ford by Georgetown President Timothy Healy, followed by a ceremonial ribbon-cutting by the two. Part of this renovation was the design and construction of an exterior fire escape for Old North at its junction with Healy Hall, the design of which incorporated architectural elements from the two buildings. The metal structure won awards from the Washington and Mid-Atlantic chapters of the American Institute of Architects.

Old North was again renovated in 2013, with all 25,000 square feet (2,300 m^{2}) across its five floors being refurbished. This entailed the removal of the wooden beams in the attic that had long-since lost their structurally supporting role and were merely decorative. This renovation was to accommodate the relocation of the Georgetown Public Policy Institute to Old North. The institute's successor, the McCourt School of Public Policy now resides in the building.

== Presidents' steps ==
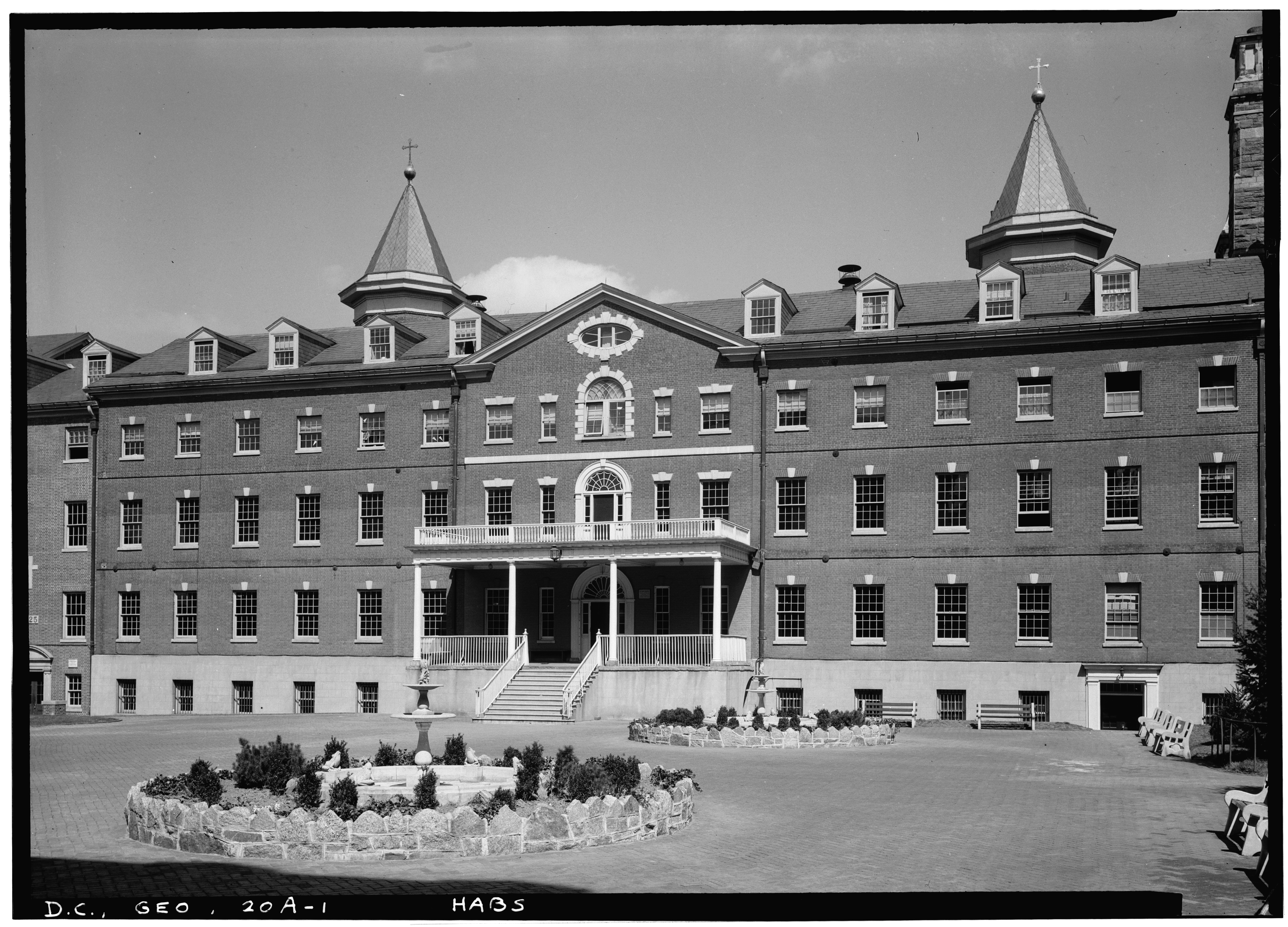
Southern elevation in 1937, depicting Dahlgren Quadrangle and the presidents' steps

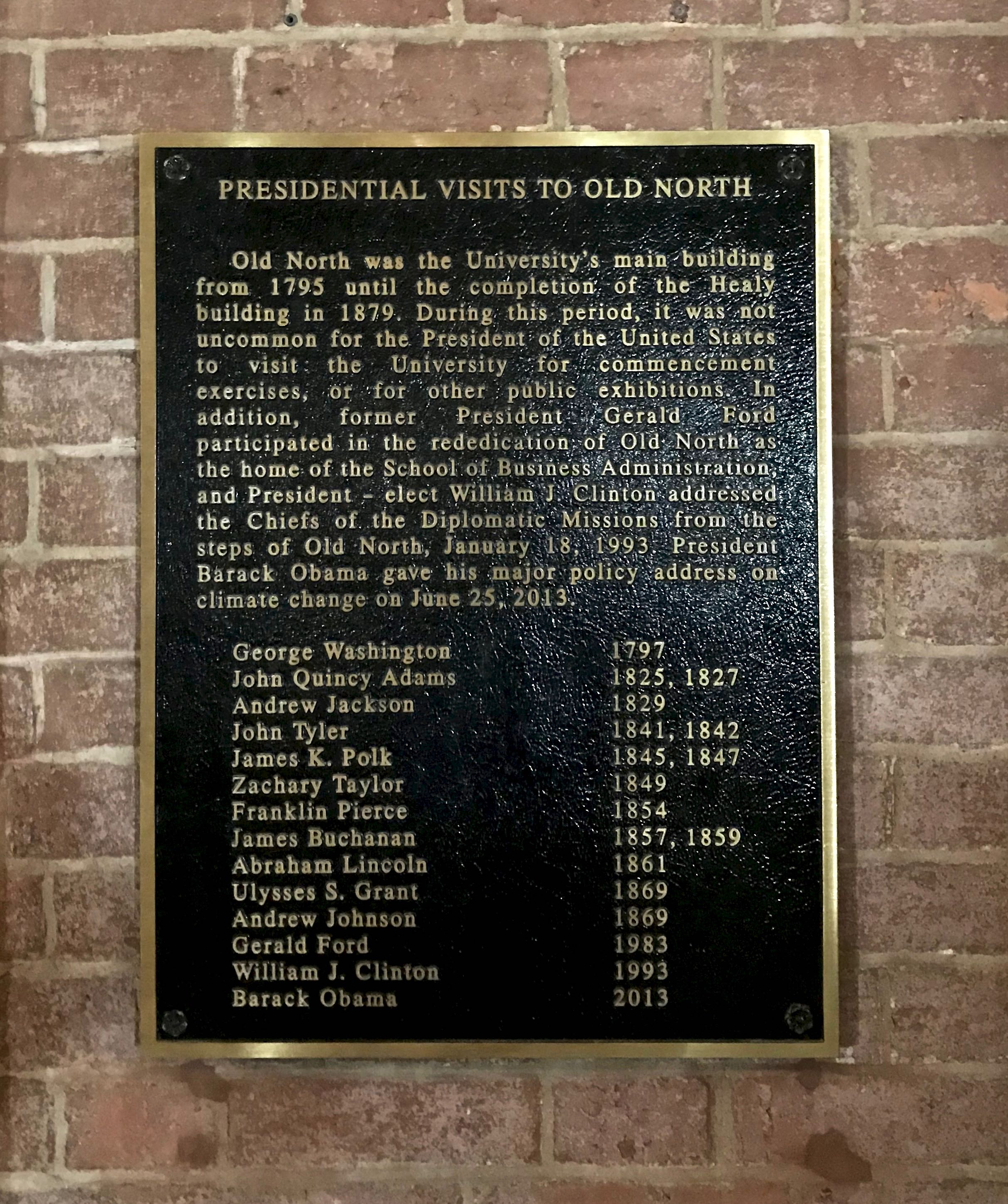
Plaque on the building commemorating the presidential visits

On August 7, 1797, George Washington, two of whose grandnephews had previously been students at Georgetown, gave a speech on the southern steps of Old North to a group assembled in Dahlgren Quadrangle. This established a precedent for presidents to speak on the same steps of the building, as well as the more general tradition of presidents visiting the building. The next president to make an appearance on the steps was John Quincy Adams. He attended a commencement of Georgetown College on July 25, 1825 and another on July 30, 1827. At the former ceremony, he was joined by the Secretary of State and several members of the diplomatic corps, and he assisted the president of the college in distributing diplomas to the graduates. President Andrew Jackson accepted an invitation to attend the commencement of July 28, 1829, however, he fell ill and did not ultimately make a trip to Georgetown. Therefore, the next president to visit Old North was John Tyler on July 26, 1841 for the annual commencement. Like Adams, he assisted with the distribution of diplomas. Tyler again attended graduation on July 26, 1842, and his son enrolled in the school the following fall. On September 28, 1845, President James K. Polk and the First Lady Sarah Childress Polk visited James Polk's nephew, Marshall Polk, who was a student at Georgetown. On July 24, 1849, President Zachary Taylor partook in the commencement exercises at Old North. He additionally made a visit on October 5, 1849, and the occasion was marked by suspending classes for the afternoon. The graduation of 1854 was attended by President Franklin Pierce on July 11, and he paid additional visits to the College on June 5 and November 6 of 1856. He was invited to attended another graduation of 1856 but did not attend due to inclement weather. President James Buchanan, whose nephew, Joseph B. Henry, was a student at the school for two years, partook in graduation on July 7, 1857 and was joined by the Secretary of the Treasury, the Attorney General, the Secretary of Interior. Buchanan again attended a graduation ceremony on July 6, 1859.

One of the most significant moments on the steps was when Abraham Lincoln addressed Union Army troops of the 69th Infantry Regiment of New York from the steps during their commandeering of part of the college's campus in May 1861 as part of his review of the troops temporarily quartered on campus. During the Civil War, Old North served as a temporary hospital for Union soldiers. President Andrew Johnson visited the campus on July 3, 1867, while his son, Andrew F. Johnson was enrolled in the school, and delivered a speech, which was followed by a light meal. President Ulysses Grant also visited the building that year, when he attended graduation, which was described as "Exhibition Day" in the house diary of the college. Accordingly, Grant distributed prizes to the students, and was later joined by former president Johnson after the departure of the students. It was at this graduation that the rector of the school, in his speech, observed the tradition of every president since George Washington joining the graduating class at the annual ceremony.

President Gerald Ford visited the building in 1983. In January 1993, President-elect and Georgetown alumnus Bill Clinton addressed the Diplomatic Corps from the steps of Old North. As of 2018, 14 American presidents have visited Old North or have spoken on the steps, the most recent of which was Barack Obama, who gave a major address on climate change in 2016.

== See also ==
- List of Georgetown University buildings
- History of Georgetown University
- Campuses of Georgetown University
