= Campuses of Georgetown University =

Physical facilities of Georgetown University

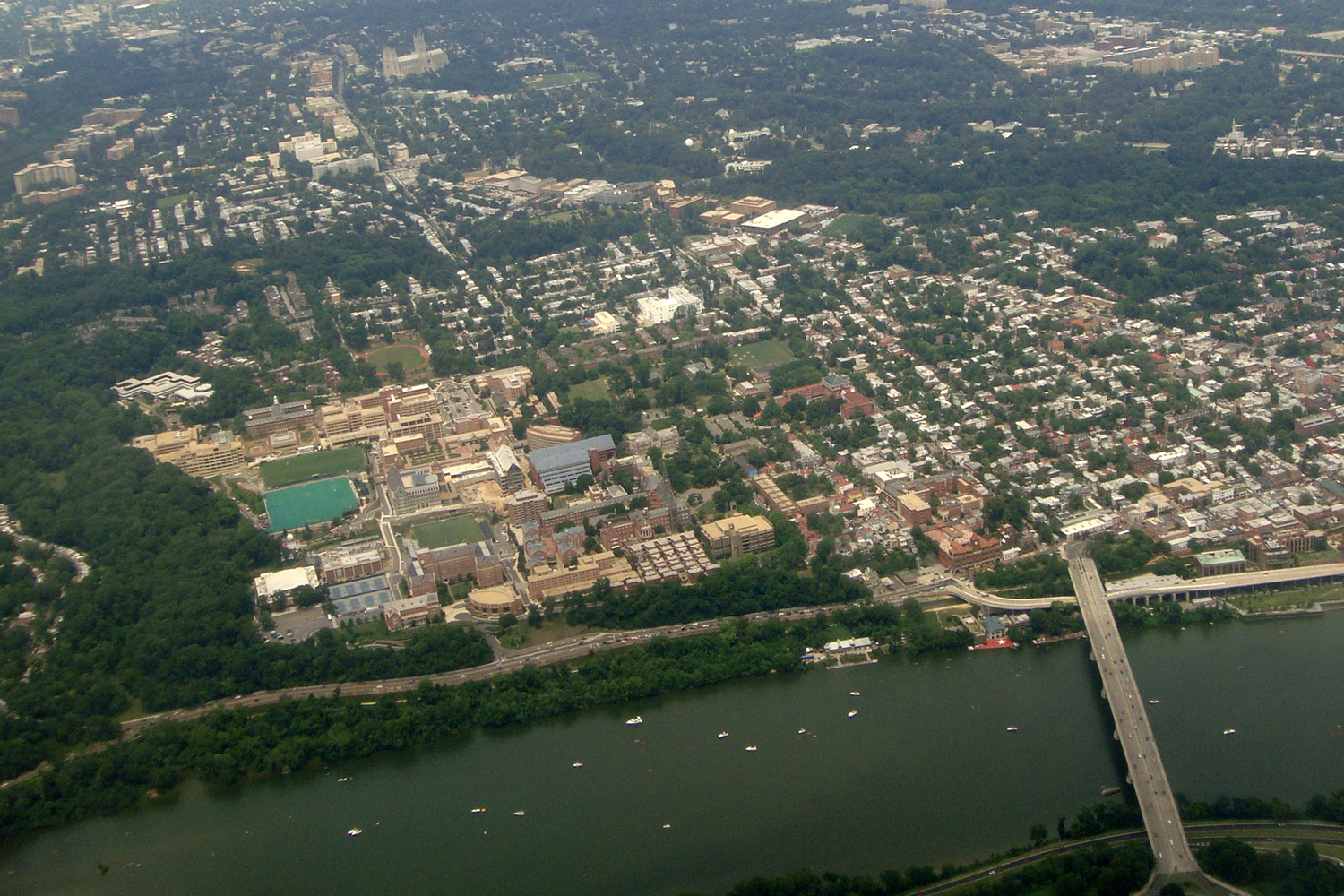
Map and aerial view of Georgetown University campus in 2011

The Campuses of Georgetown University, the Hilltop Campus, the Capitol Campus, and the Medical Campus, are located within Washington, DC. Georgetown's Hilltop and Medical Campuses are located in Georgetown, Washington, D.C. between Canal Road, Prospect Street, and Reservoir Road. The Capitol Campus is located in downtown DC on New Jersey Avenue, near Union Station. Georgetown previously also operated the Center for Continuing and Professional Education at Clarendon in Arlington, Virginia, but has since moved all operations to the Capitol Campus. Georgetown also has an overseas campus in Education City, Qatar, a facility in Jakarta, Indonesia, and villas in Alanya, Turkey and Fiesole, Italy.

== History ==
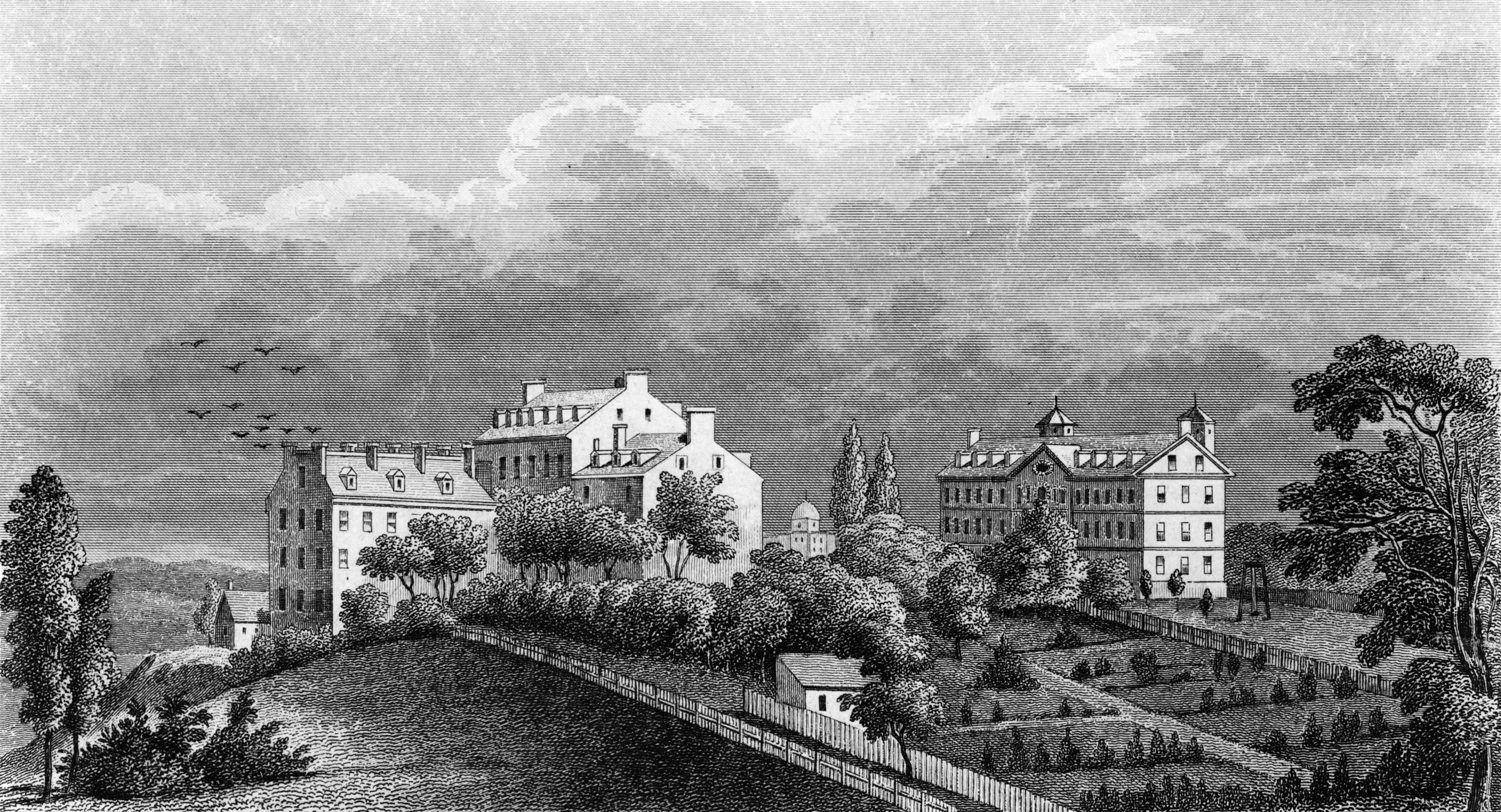
The college as it appeared around 1850

Prior to European colonization, the land that Georgetown University sits on was inhabited by the Piscataway people, an Algonquian nation that spoke a dialect of Nanticoke. The Piscataway lived in what is now Washington, D.C. and Southern Maryland for 13,000 years prior to the arrival of European settlers. Georgetown University is built in its present location for a number of historic reasons. First is the location in the Jesuit colonized state of Maryland, within proximity to the port of Georgetown, and the access and opportunities that provided. In his Proposals for Establishing an Academy, John Carroll described the "salubrity of air" and "cheapness of living" as further reasons for the school's location. Carroll did not know the nations capitol would be founded as such to include the campus, as DC was planned out in 1790 shortly after Georgetown's founding. In 1792, Holy Trinity Church of Georgetown was completed. The proximity of the school to a Catholic church had been important in choosing a location for the Jesuit institution.

John Carroll obtained the legal rights to 60 acres (240,000 m^{2}) of land from John Threlkeld in "Georgetown Heights" on January 23, 1789, though its first building, Old South, had already begun construction on this land in 1788. In 1818, farmer turned Jesuit Joseph West donated funds to purchase a sizable expansion of the campus, in which he himself oversaw the construction of numerous "walks." Buildings such as the Reiss Science Building and the Leavey Student Center, as well as hospital buildings now occupy this space. Although this and other gifts gave Georgetown rights to over 200 acres (0.81 km^{2}) of land in the area, much of this was sold off to meet the school's various debts over the years. This included the land north of modern Reservoir Road, which is now the neighborhood of Burleith.

== Libraries ==
Georgetown libraries hold 2,435,298 items in eight buildings. The Hilltop Campus's largest library is Lauinger Library, named after an alumnus killed during service in the Vietnam War. Lauinger Library includes the holdings of the former Woodstock Theological Center Library. Riggs Library dates from the nineteenth century, and was once the institution's primary library, but is now devoted primarily to archival historical materials and as a setting for formal university functions. Dahlgren Medical Library serves the Medical School, and like Lauinger Library, is built in the brutalist style popular in the 1970s. The Edward Bennett Williams Law Library and John Wolff International and Comparative Law Library comprise Georgetown's Law Library, which is the fifth largest in United States. Further, as a member of the Consortium of Universities of the Washington Metropolitan Area, students have full access to the Washington Research Library Consortium.

== Quadrangles ==
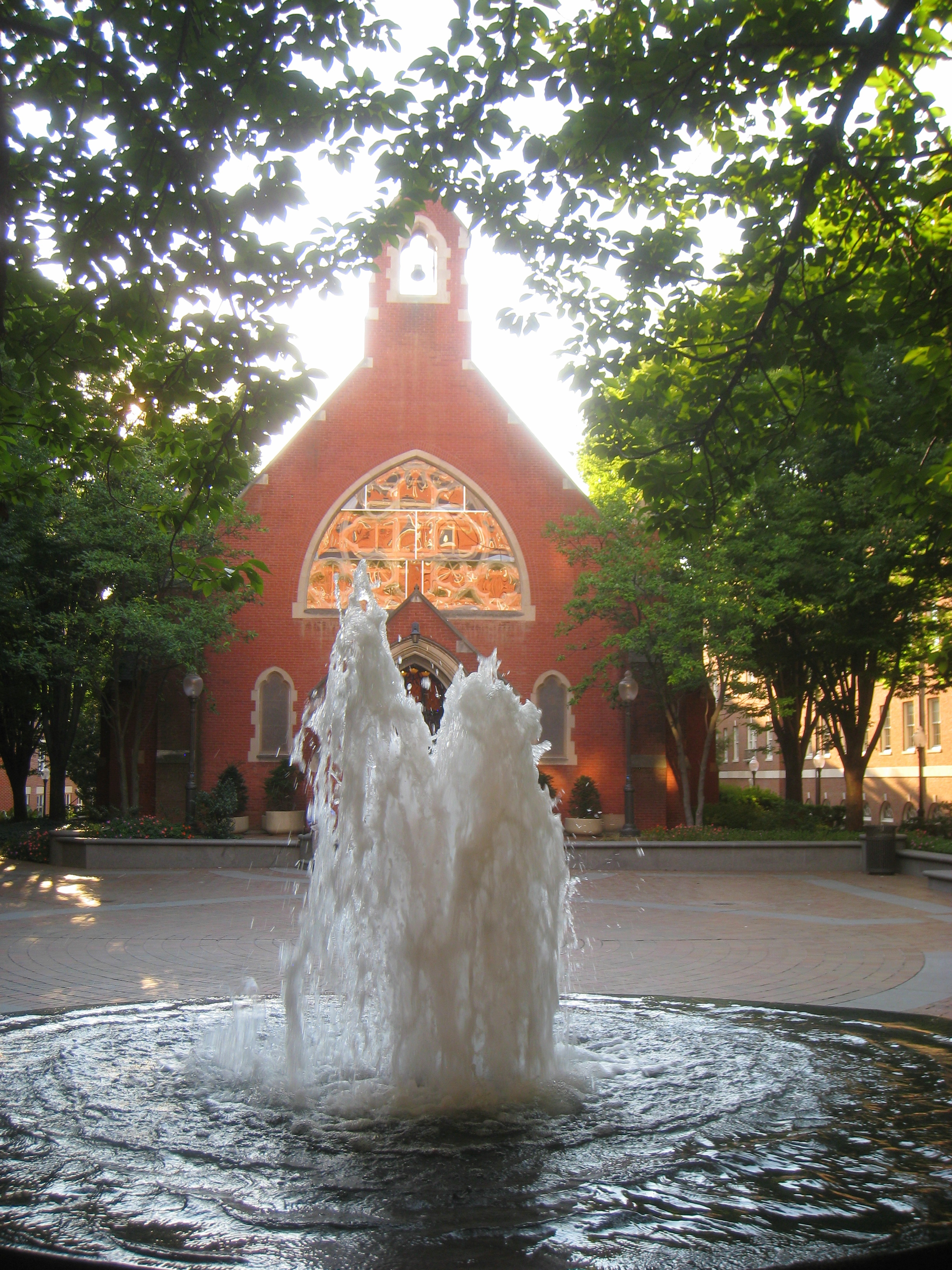
The Dahlgren Quadrangle is the traditional center of campus

The main campus has traditionally centered on Dahlgren Quadrangle, though Red Square has replaced it as the focus of student life. Old South was the first building to be built on the quad, though it was demolished in 1904 and replaced by Ryan Hall, Gervase Hall, and Maguire Hall. Old North, begun in 1794, remains in use for classes and offices. In August 1797, George Washington visited the campus and addressed students from the porch of the Old North building; since then it has become a traditional spot for presidents to speak when they visit campus. Dahlgren Quad is completed by the famous and historic Healy Hall, which is built in Flemish Romanesque style and is the undisputed gem of Georgetown's campus, and Dahlgren Chapel of the Sacred Heart. In late 2003, the Southwest Quadrangle Project was completed. This project brought a new 907-bed student dorm, an expansive dining hall, an underground parking facility, and new Jesuit Residence to the campus.

== Housing ==
Housing on Georgetown's main campus is divided between "halls," usually more traditional dormitories, and "villages," usually less traditional apartment complexes. In addition, Georgetown operates many townhouses in the Georgetown neighborhood, usually for third- and fourth-year students.

== Buildings ==
The McDonough School of Business recently constructed a new home for all of its business programs. The $82.5 million privately funded 179,000-square-foot (16,600 m^{2}) building opened in 2009. The new building included increased seminar, lecture, conference room, office, and common area spaces, expanded career management and student services facilities, and featured a state-of-the-art 400-seat auditorium.

== Overseas ==
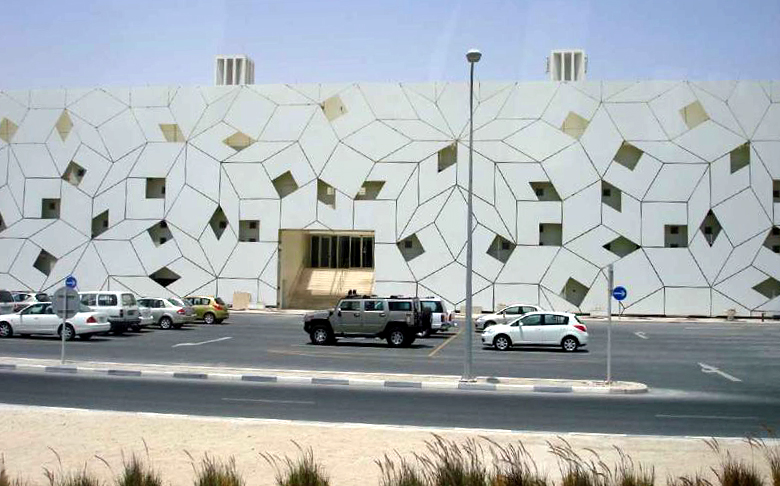
The Liberal Arts and Science Building houses classrooms at SFS-Qatar.

=== Italy ===
In December 1979, the Marquesa Margaret Rockefeller de Larrain, granddaughter of John D. Rockefeller, gave the Villa Le Balze to Georgetown University. The Villa is in Fiesole, Italy, on a hill above the city of Florence. The Villa is used year-round for study abroad programs focused on specialized interdisciplinary study of Italian culture and civilization.

=== Turkey ===
The main facility for the McGhee Center for Eastern Mediterranean Studies was donated to Georgetown in 1989 by alumnus and former United States Ambassador to Turkey George C. McGhee. The school is in the town of Alanya, Turkey within the Seljuq-era Alanya Castle, on the Mediterranean Sea. The center operates study abroad programs one semester each year, concentrating on Turkish language, architectural history, and Islamic studies.

=== Qatar ===
In 2002, the Qatar Foundation for Education, Science and Community Development presented the School of Foreign Service with the resources and space to open a facility in the new Education City in Doha, Qatar. Georgetown University's campus in Qatar opened in 2005 as a liberal arts and international affairs undergraduate school for regional students.

=== United Kingdom ===
In 2008, the Georgetown University Law Center in conjunction with an international consortium of law schools established the Center for Transnational Legal Studies in London, England.

=== Indonesia ===
On November 12, 2023, the president of Indonesia, Joko Widodo, announced plans for the Walsh School of Foreign Service to open a satellite campus in Jakarta, Indonesia, in collaboration with the Indonesian government. Known as Georgetown SFS Asia-Pacific (GSAP), the campus opened in January 2025 and is located in The Plaza, an office tower in the Sudirman Central Business District.

== Gallery ==
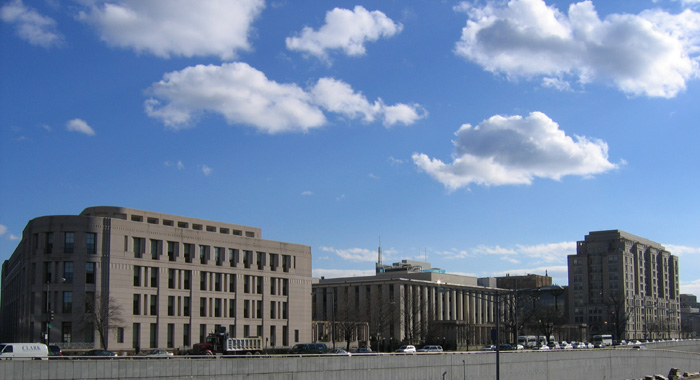
Law Center Campus

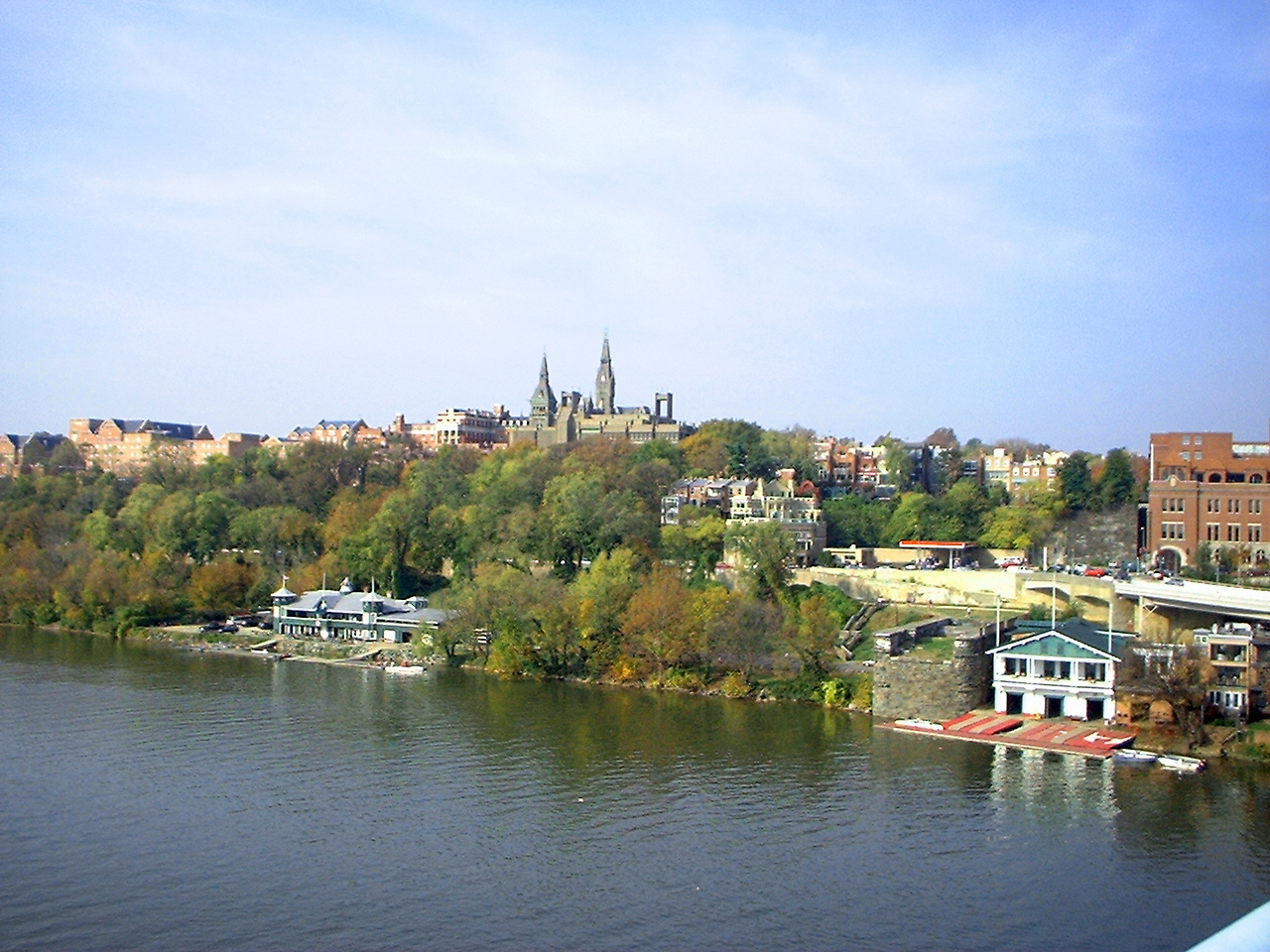
The campus over the Potomac River

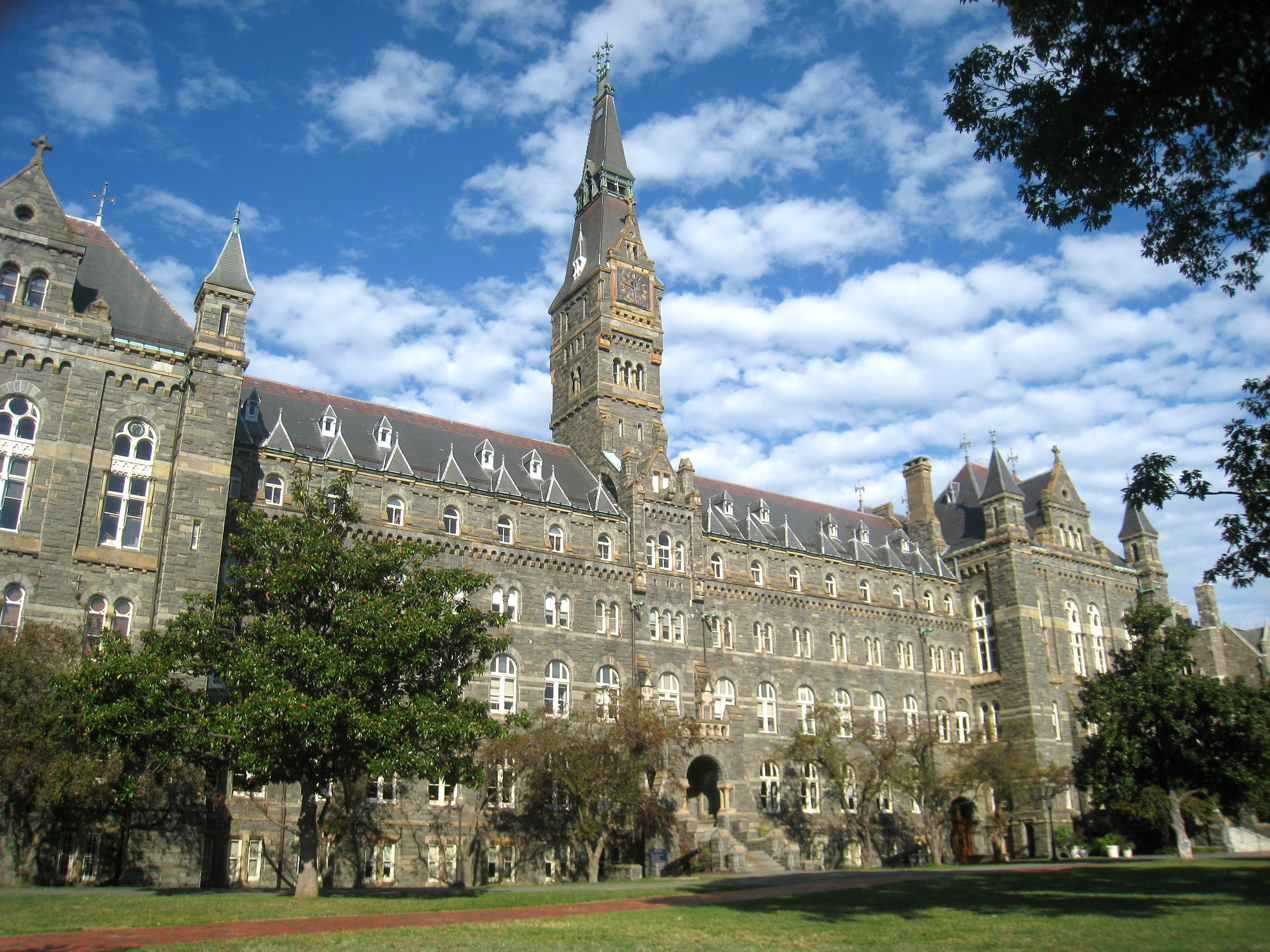
Healy Hall

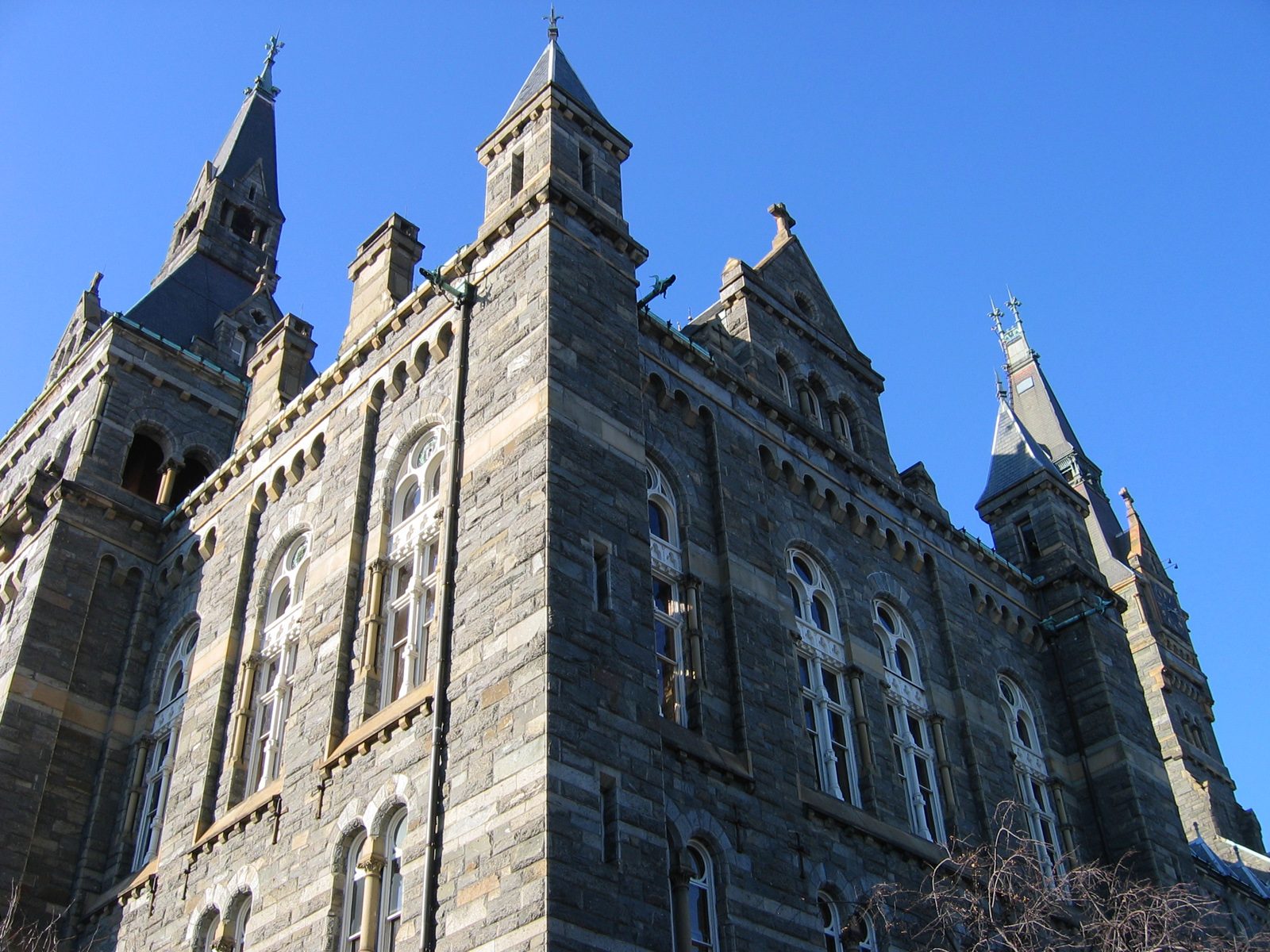
North tower of Healy Hall

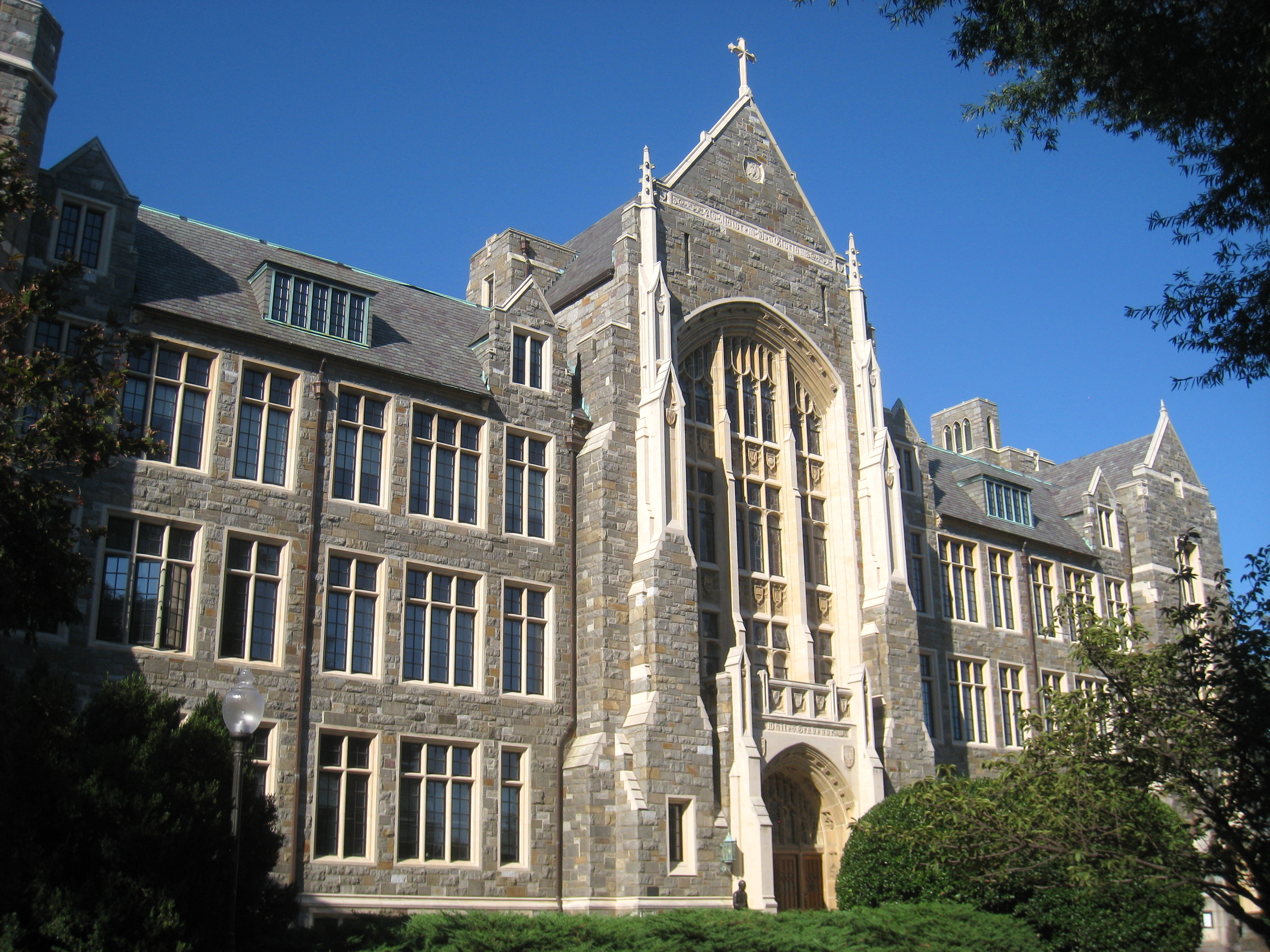
White-Gravenor Building

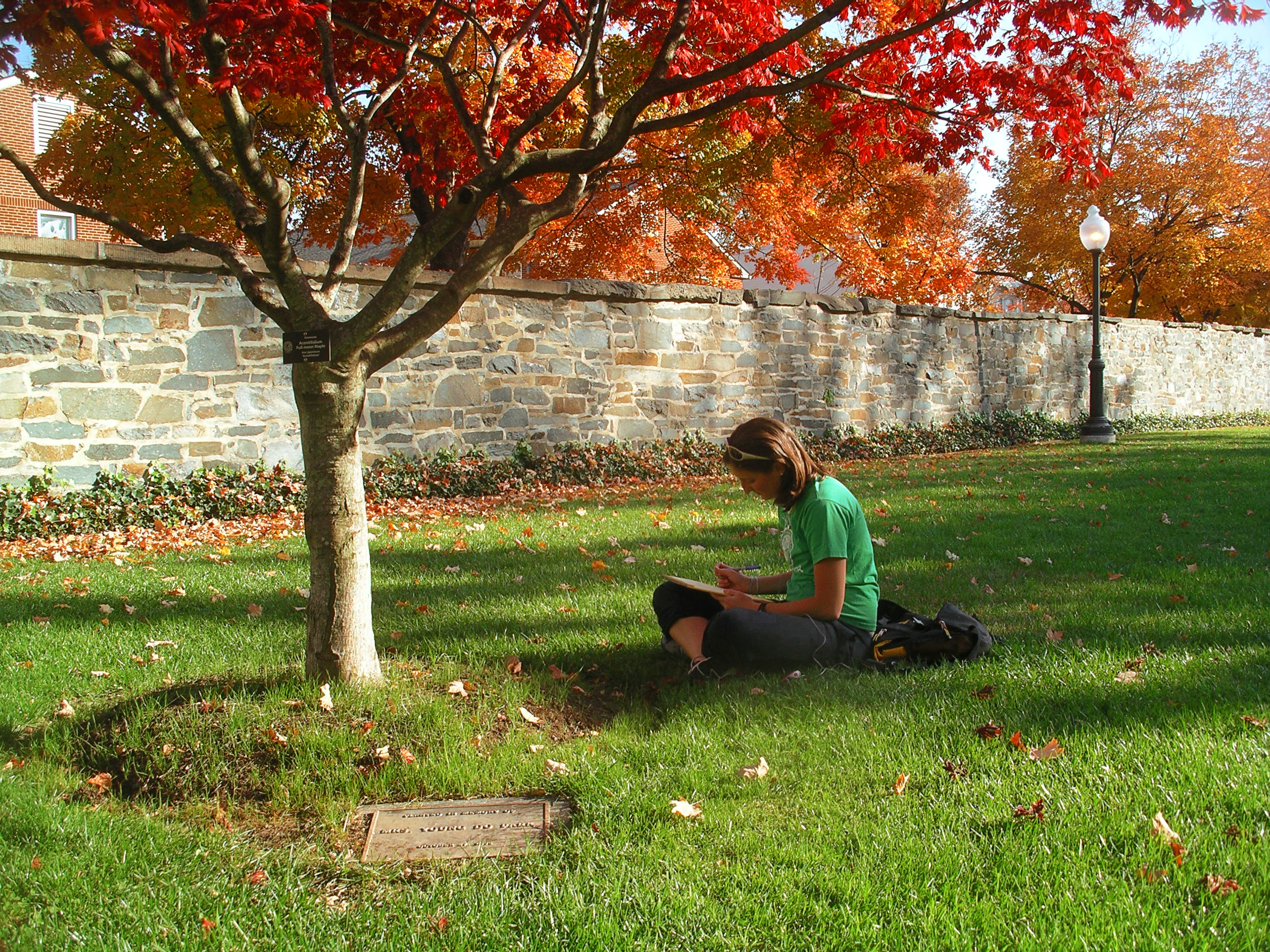
Student studying on Copley Lawn

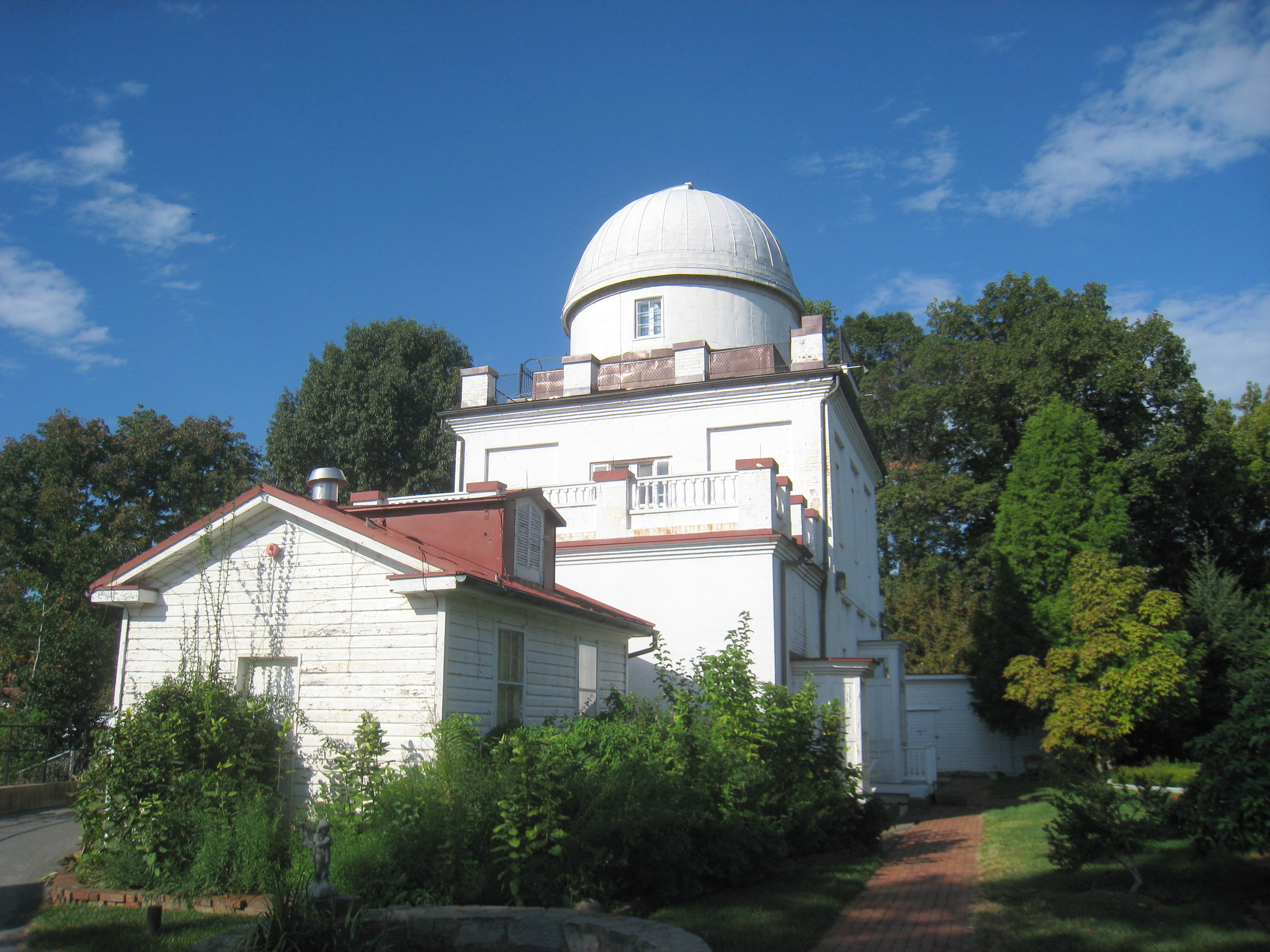
Observatory

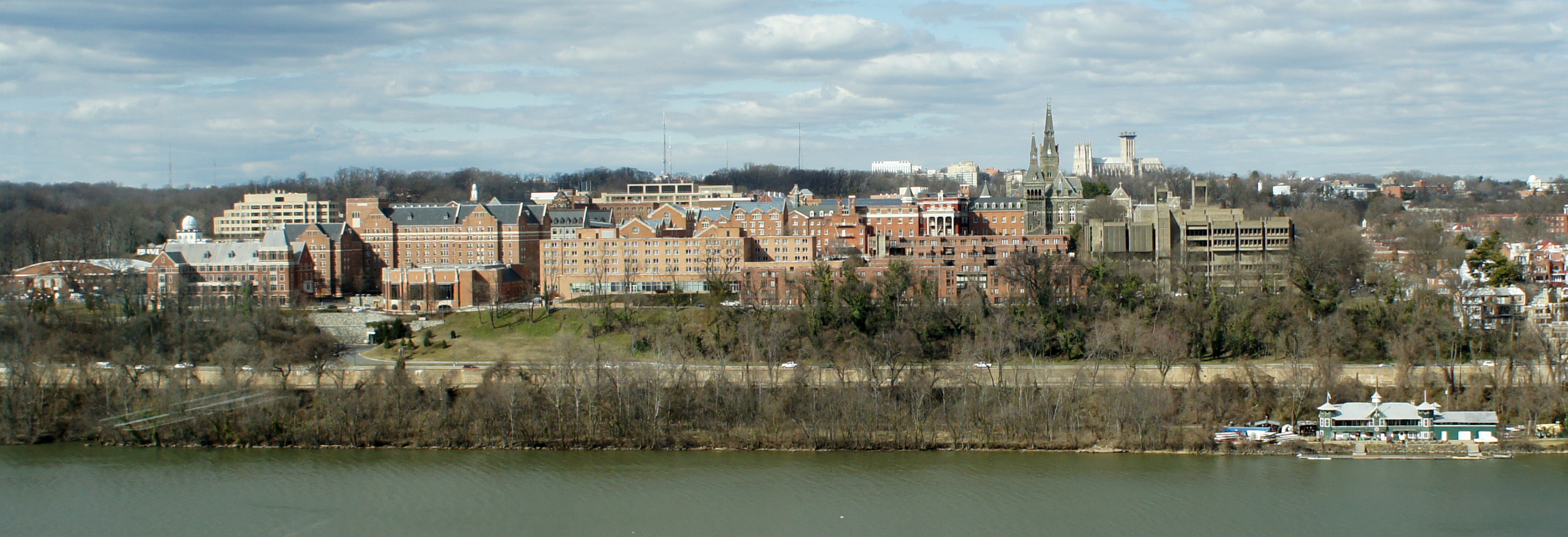
