= Lauinger Library =

Library in Washington, D.C.

Coordinates: 38°54′23″N 77°4′20″W

Joseph Mark Lauinger Library
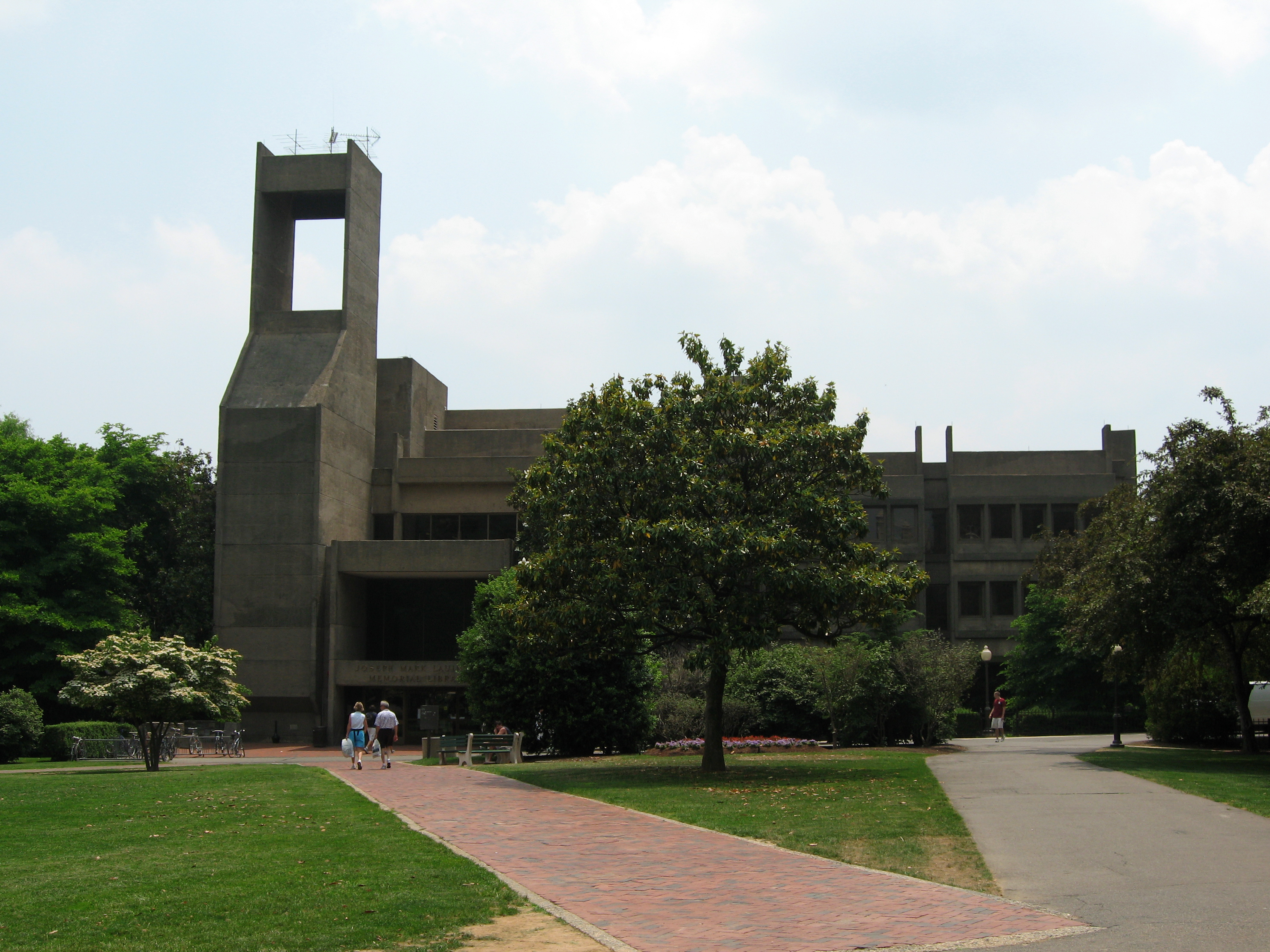
- Facade and tower of Lauinger Library
- Interactive map of the Joseph Mark Lauinger Library area

General information
- Type: Library
- Architectural style: Brutalist
- Location: 37th & O Streets NW, Washington, D.C., United States
- Opened: April 1970
- Owner: Georgetown University

Technical details
- Floor count: 6

Design and construction
- Architect: John Carl Warnecke

Website
- www.library.georgetown.edu
- Architect: John Carl Warnecke

Collection
- Size: 1.7 million

The Joseph Mark Lauinger Library is the main library of Georgetown University and the center of the seven-library Georgetown library system that includes 3.5 million volumes. It holds 1.7 million volumes on six floors and has accommodations for individual and group study on all levels. It is generally referred to colloquially as "Lau" by Georgetown students.

Opened on April 6, 1970, the library was named after an alumnus and Georgetown Chime who was killed in the Vietnam War. It holds the Woodstock Theological Center Library, the remnants of the library of Woodstock College and one of the country's leading Catholic theological libraries. The fifth floor houses the Booth Center for Special Collections, named after David G. Booth, which contains a number of archival documents related to Georgetown as well as an extensive collection of rare books, manuscripts, and art.

Lauinger Library replaced Riggs Library, which had been the main library at Georgetown since 1891, one of the few extant cast iron libraries in the nation. By the middle of the 20th century, Riggs no longer had the capacity to serve as Georgetown's primary library. The need for more space was the primary reason for the construction of Lauinger. However, Riggs library still serves its original function—storing books—despite that it is mostly used for formal events at the university.

The library has views of the Potomac River and the skyline of neighboring Rosslyn, Virginia. Designed by architect John Carl Warnecke, the building is supposed to be a brutalist interpretation of Flemish Romanesque Healy Hall, located adjacent to Lauinger on Georgetown's main quad.

The Students of Georgetown, Inc. also known as "The Corp," operates a coffee shop named "The Midnight MUG" on the second floor of the building. The cafe is usually referred to as "Midnight MUG" or simply "Midnight" and has been in operation since 2003.

== Design ==
The library was originally conceived with a traditional design similar to other buildings at Georgetown University. However, Warnecke's final design of the Lauinger Library embraces brutalism and was intended as a modern interpretation of the nearby Healy Hall, a Flemish Romanesque building, with its iconic spire echoing the clock tower of Healy.

The building once received the Award of Merit by the American Institute of Architects in 1976 for distinguished accomplishment in library architecture. However, in recent years, as public attitudes towards brutalism shifted, the library has been referred to as one of the "ugliest" building in Georgetown. In 2018, it was designated one of the "ugliest" buildings in America, with Business Insider labeling it the second ugliest in Washington, D.C., behind the Watergate complex.

== See also ==
- List of Brutalist architecture in the United States
