= Georgetown University =

Private Jesuit university in Washington, D.C.

- Latin: Collegium Georgiopolitanum (Note: Collegium Georgiopolitanum is the Latin nominative case. On Georgetown diplomas, the name appears in the genitive case in the phrase Praeses et Professores Collegii Georgiopolitani (tr. "President and Faculty of Georgetown College").)
- Former name: Georgetown College (1789–1815)
- Motto: Utraque Unum (Latin)
- Motto in English: "Both into One" (Note: Utraque Unum is Latin from Paul's Epistle to the Ephesians 2:14. See official explanation. Other translations available.)
- Type: Private federally chartered research university
- Established: January 23, 1789; 237 years ago
- Founder: John Carroll
- Accreditation: MSCHE
- Religious affiliation: Catholic (Jesuit)
- Academic affiliations: AAU; CUWMA; COFHE; CUMU; GULF
- Endowment: $4.84 billion (2026)
- President: Eduardo Peñalver
- Total staff: 7,419: 5,869 full-time; 1,550 part-time
- Students: 20,031 (fall 2024)
- Undergraduates: 7,833 (fall 2024)
- Postgraduates: 12,198 (fall 2024)
- Location: Washington, D.C., United States; 38°54′26″N 77°4′22″W
- Campus: 104 acres (42 ha); Large city
- Colors: Blue and gray
- Nickname: Hoyas
- Sporting affiliations: NCAA Division I – Big East; Patriot League; EARC; EAWRC
- Mascot: Jack the Bulldog
- Alma mater song: "Georgetown University Alma Mater," lyrics by Robert J. Collier (1894)
- Website: georgetown.edu

Georgetown University Alma Mater
- Georgetown University Chamber Singers and Concert Choir: file; help

Georgetown University is a private Jesuit research university in Washington, D.C., United States. Founded by Bishop John Carroll in 1789, (Note: as Georgetown College) it is the oldest Catholic institution of higher education in the United States, the oldest university in Washington, D.C., (Note: Predating the establishment of the District of Columbia, which annexed the settlement of Georgetown, then part of Maryland, in 1801.) and the nation's first federally chartered university.

The university has eleven undergraduate and graduate schools. Its main campus, located in the Georgetown historic neighborhood, is on a hill above the Potomac River and identifiable by Healy Hall, a National Historic Landmark. It is classified among "R1: Doctoral Universities – Very high research activity" and is a member of the Association of American Universities (AAU). The university offers degree programs in forty-eight disciplines, enrolling an average of 7,500 undergraduate and 10,000 graduate students from more than 135 countries; it is the second largest Catholic university in terms of enrollment in North America. The school's athletic teams are nicknamed the Hoyas and include a men's basketball team, which is a member of the Big East Conference.

Notable alumni include 35 Rhodes Scholars, 46 Marshall Scholars, 33 Truman Scholars, 565 Fulbright Scholars, at least 12 living billionaires, 26 U.S. governors, 2 U.S. Supreme Court justices, 2 U.S. presidents, and 116 members of the United States Congress including 26 senators, as well as international royalty and more than a dozen foreign heads of state. Georgetown has educated more U.S. diplomats than any other university including at least 92 ambassadors of the United States, as well as a number of American politicians and civil servants.

== History ==
=== Founding ===
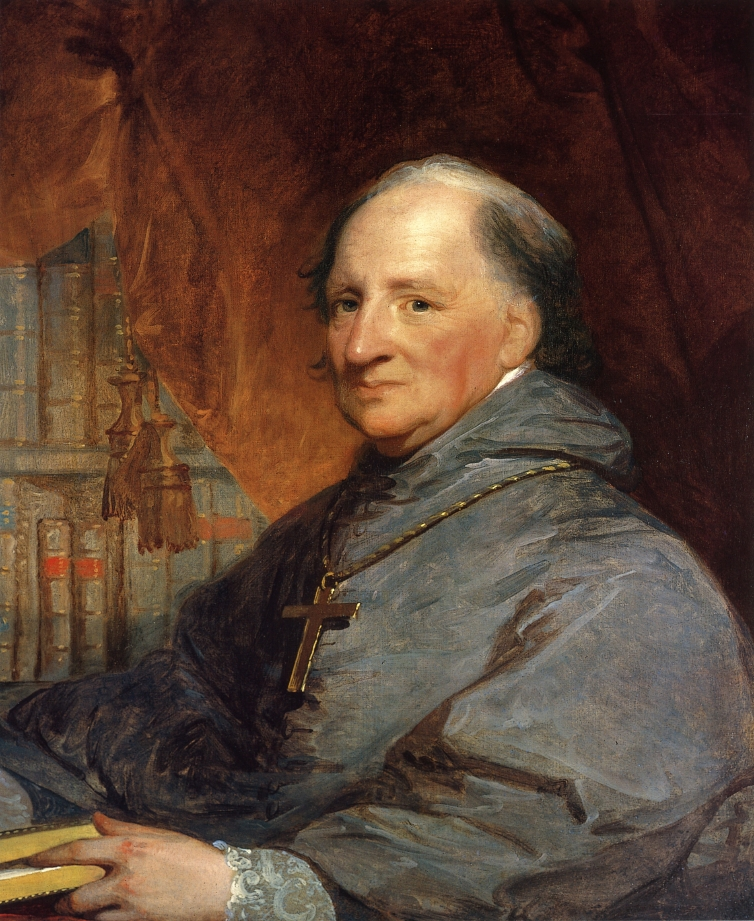
John Carroll, the first archbishop of Baltimore and founder of Georgetown University in 1789

In 1634, Jesuit settlers from England founded the Province of Maryland in colonial-era British America. In 1646, the defeat of the Royalists in the English Civil War led to stringent laws against Catholic education and the extradition of known Jesuits from the colony, including missionary Andrew White, and the destruction of their school at Calverton Manor. During most of the remainder of Maryland's colonial period, Jesuits conducted Catholic schools clandestinely. Following the end of the American Revolutionary War, plans to establish a permanent Catholic institution for education in the United States were realized.

At Benjamin Franklin's recommendation, Pope Pius VI appointed former Jesuit John Carroll the first head of the Catholic Church in the United States, even though the papal suppression of the Jesuit order was still in effect. Carroll began meetings of local clergy in 1783 near Annapolis, where they orchestrated the development of a new university. On January 23, 1789, Carroll finalized the purchase of the property in Georgetown on which Dahlgren Quadrangle was later built. Future Congressman William Gaston was enrolled as the school's first student on November 22, 1791, and instruction began on January 2, 1792.

=== 19th century ===
During its early years, Georgetown College suffered from considerable financial strain. The Maryland Society of Jesus began its restoration in 1805, and Jesuit affiliation, in the form of teachers and administrators, bolstered confidence in the college. The school relied on private sources of funding and the limited profits from local lands which had been donated to the Jesuits.

President James Madison signed into law Georgetown's congressional charter on March 1, 1815, creating the first federal university charter, which allowed it to confer degrees, with the first bachelor's degrees being awarded two years later.

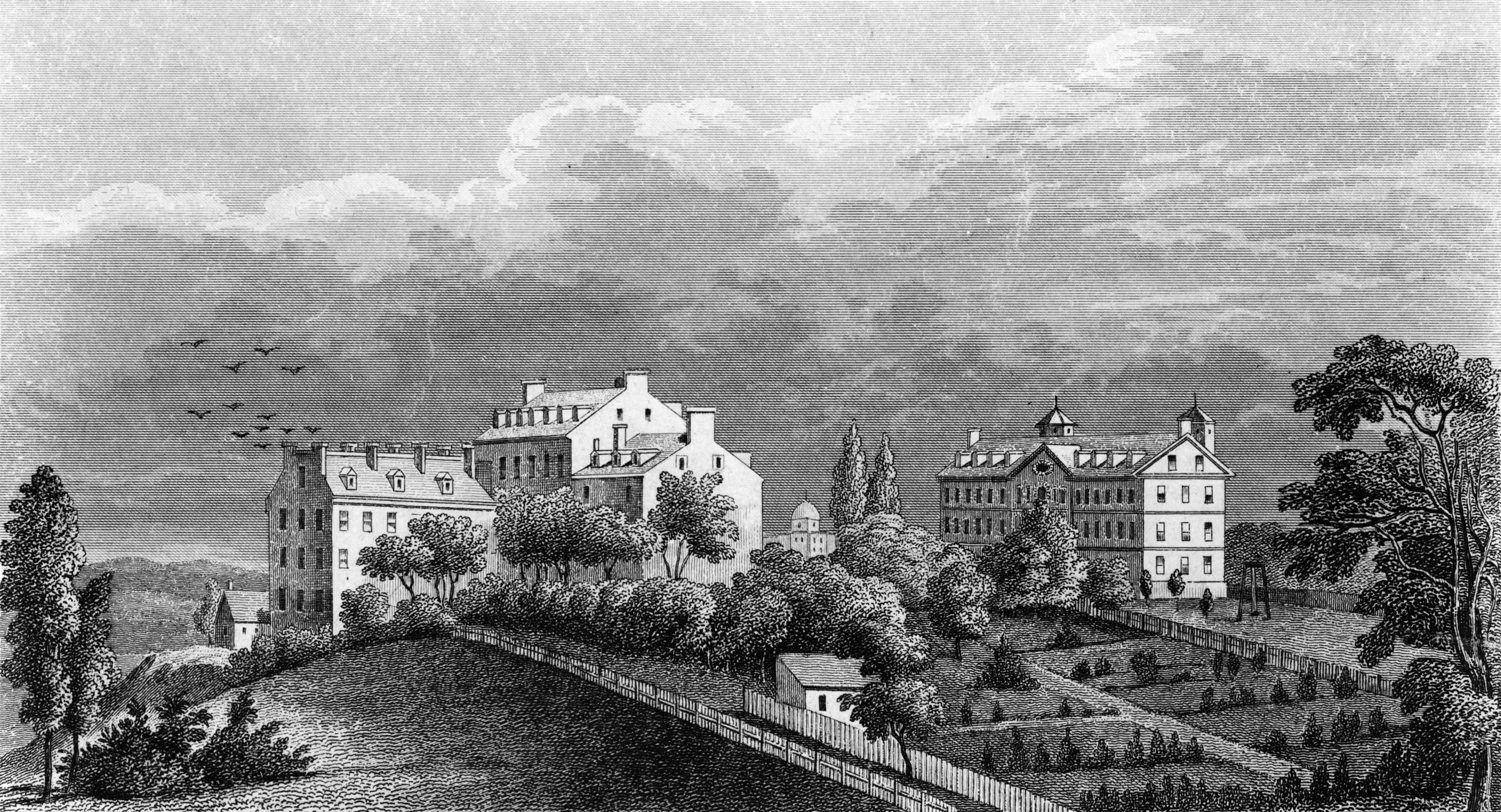
Georgetown University, c. 1850

In 1838, to permanently end their slaveholding, and to raise money for the university and other schools, Maryland Jesuits conducted a mass sale of some 272 slaves to two Deep South plantations in Maringouin, Louisiana, from their six in Maryland.

In 1844, the school received a corporate charter under the name "The President and Directors of Georgetown College", affording the growing school additional legal rights. In response to the demand for a local option for Catholic students, the Medical School was founded in 1851.

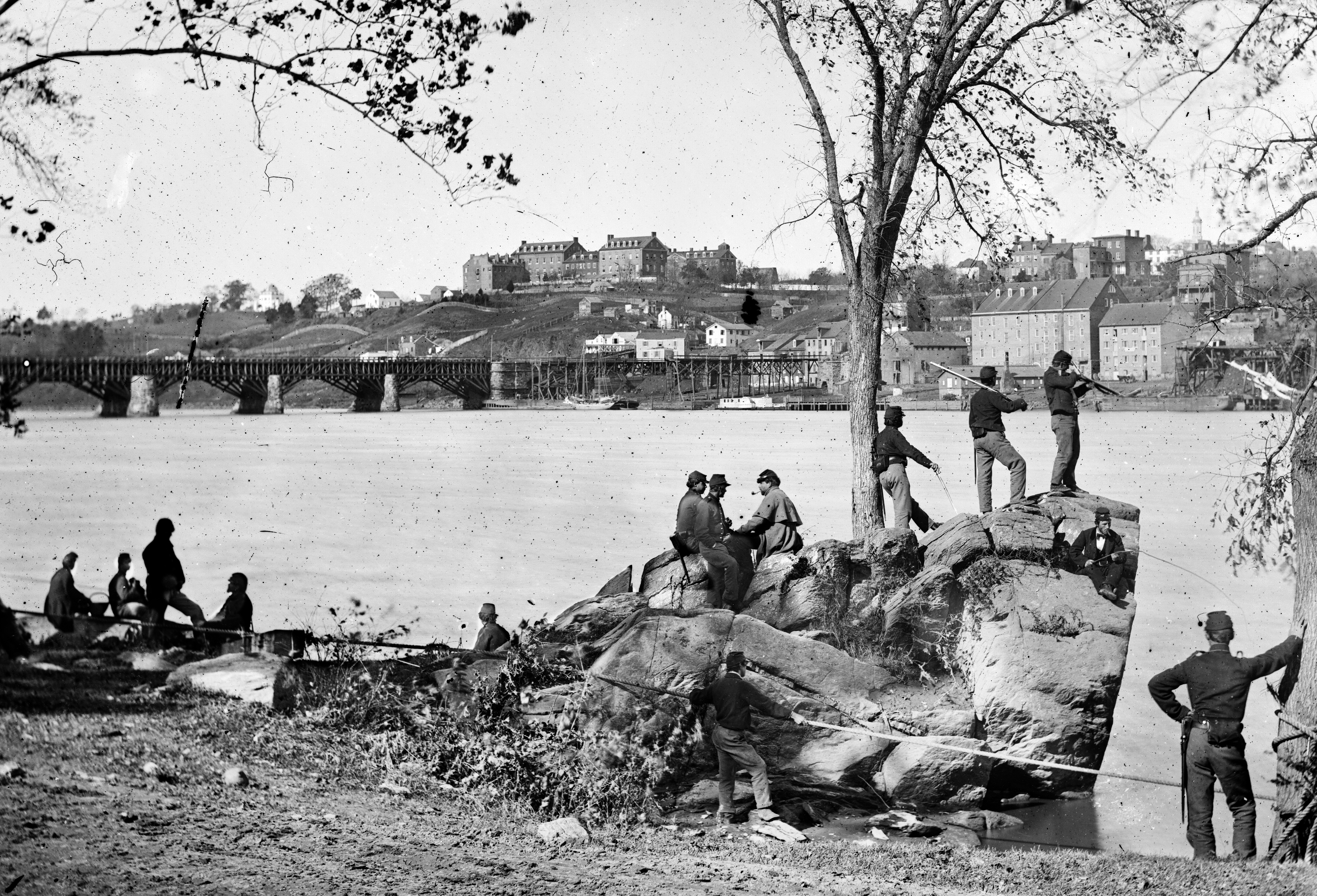
Union army soldiers on Theodore Roosevelt Island with the Potomac River and the university visible in the background in 1861 at the beginning of the American Civil War

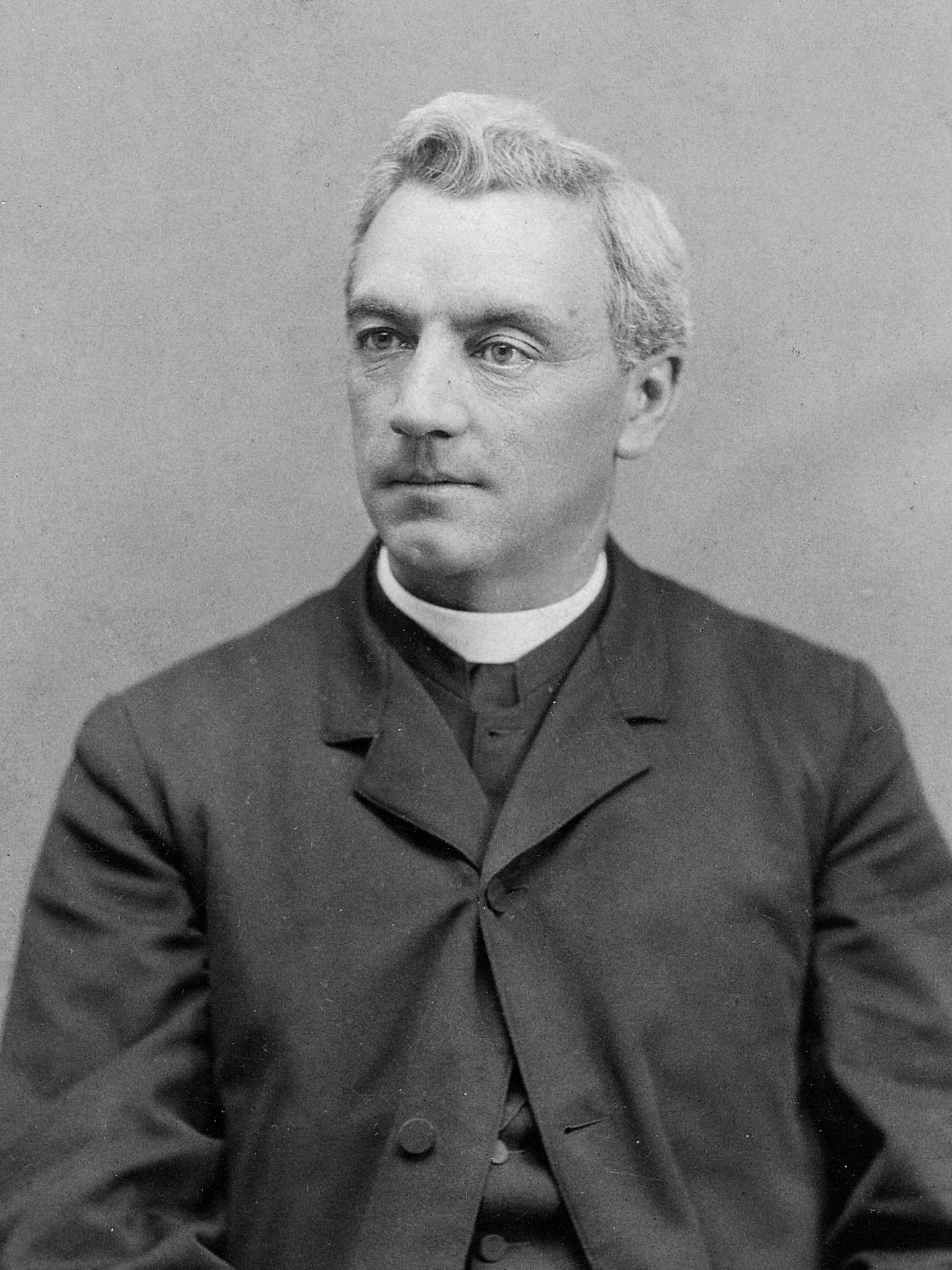
Patrick Francis Healy, the first African-American to become a Jesuit, helped transform the school into a modern university after the Civil War.

The American Civil War greatly impacted Georgetown as 1,141 students and alumni enlisted in one army or the other, and the Union army commandeered university buildings in order to defend the national capital from a feared Confederate attack. By the time President Abraham Lincoln visited the Georgetown campus in May 1861, 1,400 troops were living in temporary quarters there. The number of lives lost in the Civil war caused enrollment levels to remain low until well after the war. Only seven students graduated in 1869, down from over 300 in the previous decade. When the Georgetown College Boat Club, the school's rowing team, was founded in 1876 it adopted two colors: blue, used for Union uniforms, and gray, used for Confederate uniforms. These colors signified the peaceful existence of students who held various loyalties.

Enrollment did not recover until the late 19th century, during the presidency of Patrick Francis Healy from 1873 to 1881. Born in Athens, Georgia, as a slave by law and mixed-race by ancestry, Healy was the first person of African descent to head a predominantly white American university. (Note: While Patrick Francis Healy inherited African ancestry from his mother and was consequently classified as racially black according to the "one-drop rule" of 19th-century American society, he self-identified racially as white and ethnically as Irish American.) He identified as Irish Catholic, like his father, and was educated in Catholic schools in the United States and France. He is credited with reforming the undergraduate curriculum, lengthening the medical and law programs, and creating the Alumni Association. One of his largest undertakings was the construction of a major new building, subsequently named Healy Hall in his honor. For his work, Healy is known as the school's "second founder".

In 1870, after the founding of the Law Department, Healy and his successors hoped to bind the professional schools into a university, and focus on higher education.

=== 20th century ===
The School of Medicine added a dental school in 1901, and the undergraduate School of Nursing was established 1903. Georgetown Preparatory School relocated from campus in 1919 and fully separated from the university in 1927.

The School of Foreign Service (SFS) was founded in 1919 by Edmund A. Walsh to prepare students for leadership in diplomacy and foreign commerce. The School of Dentistry became independent of the School of Medicine in 1956. The School of Business Administration was separated from the SFS in 1957 and was renamed the McDonough School of Business (MSB) in 1998 in honor of SFS alumnus Robert E. McDonough.

Georgetown also aimed to expand its resources and student body. The School of Nursing has admitted female students since its founding, and most of the university classes were made available to women on a limited basis by 1952. With the College of Arts and Sciences welcoming its first female students in the 1969–1970 academic year, Georgetown became fully coeducational.

In 1962, the Center for Strategic and International Studies (CSIS) was founded at Georgetown University as a think tank to conduct policy studies and strategic analyses of political, economic and security issues throughout the world. When Henry Kissinger retired from his position as U.S. Secretary of State in 1977, he taught at Georgetown SFS, making CSIS the base for his Washington operations. In 1986, the university's board of directors voted to sever all ties with CSIS due to differences in academic direction and competing fund-raising efforts.

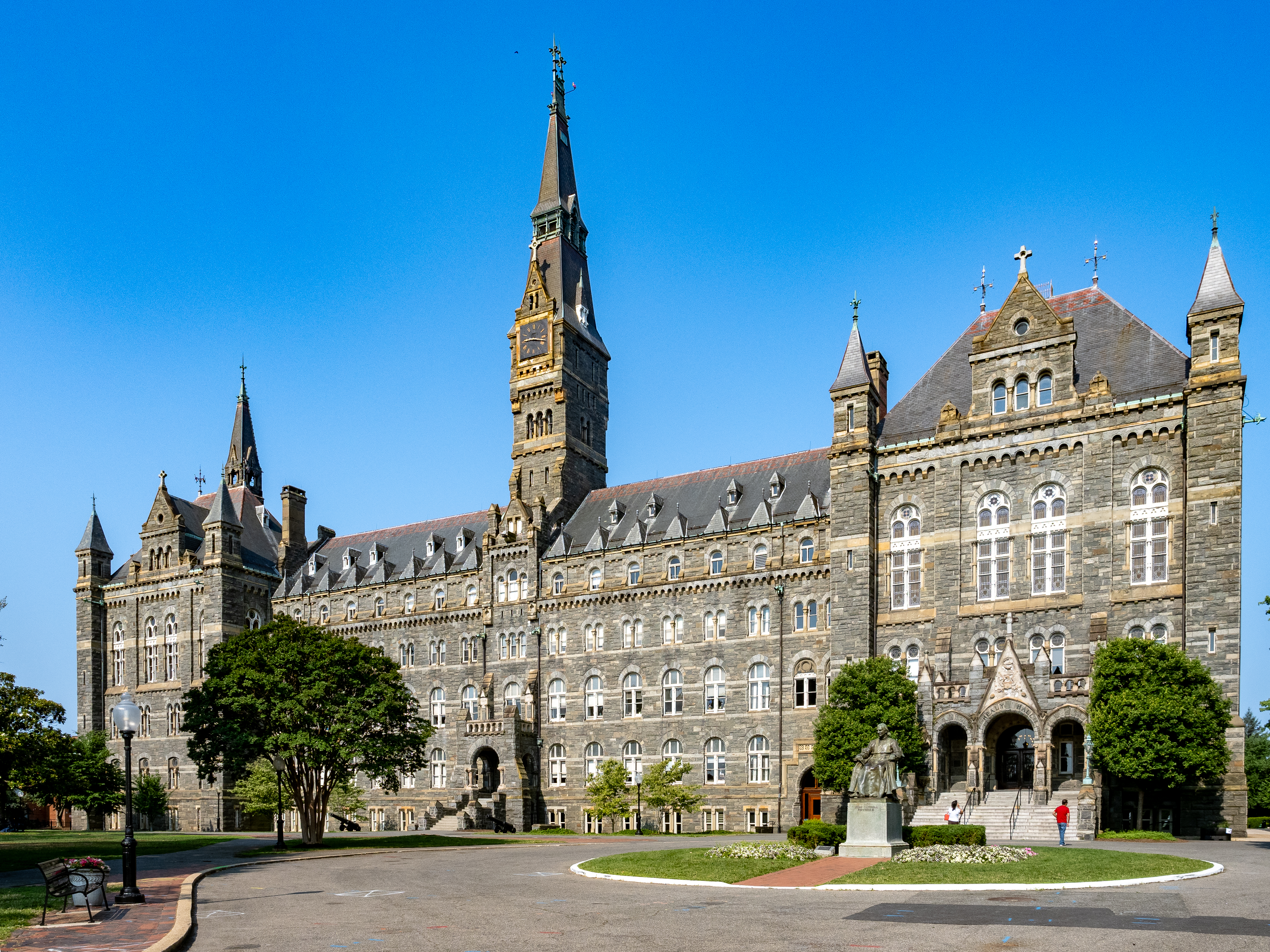
Healy Hall, which houses classrooms and the university's executive body

In 1975, Georgetown established the Center for Contemporary Arab Studies, soliciting funds from the governments of the United States, Saudi Arabia, Oman, and Libya as well as American corporations with business interests in the Middle East. It later returned the money it received from Muammar Qaddafi's Libyan government, which had been used to fund a chair for Hisham Shirabi, and also returned further donations from Iraq. Georgetown ended its bicentennial year of 1989 by electing Leo J. O'Donovan, S.J. as president. He subsequently launched the Third Century Campaign to expand the school's endowment.

=== 21st century ===
John J. DeGioia, Georgetown's first lay president, led the school from 2001 to 2024. He stepped down from his role as president in November of 2024 to focus on his recovery following a stroke in June of that year. DeGioia continued the school's financial modernization and sought to "expand opportunities for intercultural and interreligious dialogue." DeGioia also founded the annual Building Bridges Seminar in 2001, which is part of Georgetown's effort to promote religious pluralism. The Berkley Center for Religion, Peace, and World Affairs began as an initiative in 2004, and after a grant from William R. Berkley, was launched as an independent organization in 2006.

In December 2003, Georgetown completed the campaign after raising over $1 billion for financial aid, academic chair endowment, and new capital projects. According to the portal of the Department of Education which publicizes disclosures of foreign funding of gifts greater than $250,000 as required by Section 117 Georgetown has received the ninth-largest amount of foreign contracts and gifts out of recorded U.S. universities. Between 1992 and 2025 Georgetown received almost $1.5 billion in foreign contracts and gifts, of which $1.1 billion were from Qatar, $971 million since 2005.

In October 2002, Georgetown University began studying the feasibility of opening a campus of the SFS in Qatar, when the non-profit Qatar Foundation first proposed the idea. The School of Foreign Service in Qatar opened in 2005 along with four other U.S. universities in the Education City development. Additionally, the Center for International and Regional Studies (CIRS) opened in 2005 at the new Qatar campus.

In 2005, Georgetown received a $20 million gift from Alwaleed bin Talal bin Abdulaziz Alsaud, a member of the Saudi Royal Family; at that time the second-largest donation ever to the university, it was used to expand the activities of the Prince Alwaleed Bin Talal Center for Muslim-Christian Understanding. The same year, Georgetown began hosting a two-week workshop at Fudan University's School of International Relations and Public Affairs in Shanghai, China, which developed into a more formal connection when Georgetown opened a liaison office at Fudan on January 12, 2008.

Between 2012 and 2018, Georgetown received more than $350 million from Gulf Cooperation Council countries including Saudi Arabia, Qatar, and the United Arab Emirates.

The university announced a Reconciliation Fund in October 2022, and its first five grants, totaling $200,000, were awarded in April 2023 to projects serving descendant communities in Maryland and Louisiana.

In March 2023, Georgetown established the Center for the Study of Slavery and Its Legacies to support research, teaching, creative projects, and interdisciplinary study concerning slavery and its continuing effects.

In September 2023, Georgetown and Jesuit organizations announced $27 million in commitments to the Descendants Truth & Reconciliation Foundation, comprising $10 million from Georgetown and $17 million from the Jesuits, including a $10 million matching commitment and plantation land valued at approximately $7 million.

Questions have been raised about the multifaceted nature of the influence by Qatar which has involved it in Georgetown's governance (via members of the Board of Directors), faculty hiring, scholarships, and academic programming. For example, the Louis D. Brandeis Center for Human Rights Under Law has asked the US Department of Justice to investigate whether or not a $630,000 agreement between the university’s Bridge Initiative (part of the Prince Alwaleed Bin Talal Center for Muslim-Christian Understanding) and Qatar’s Ministry of Foreign Affairs, violated FARA (the Foreign Agents Registration Act) with programming highly influenced by a foreign government, while not registering as a foreign agent. In 2025 the Qatar Foundation renewed its 2005 agreement with Georgetown for another 10 years raising additional questions, given Qatar’s support of terrorism and Islamist extremism.

=== Jesuit tradition ===
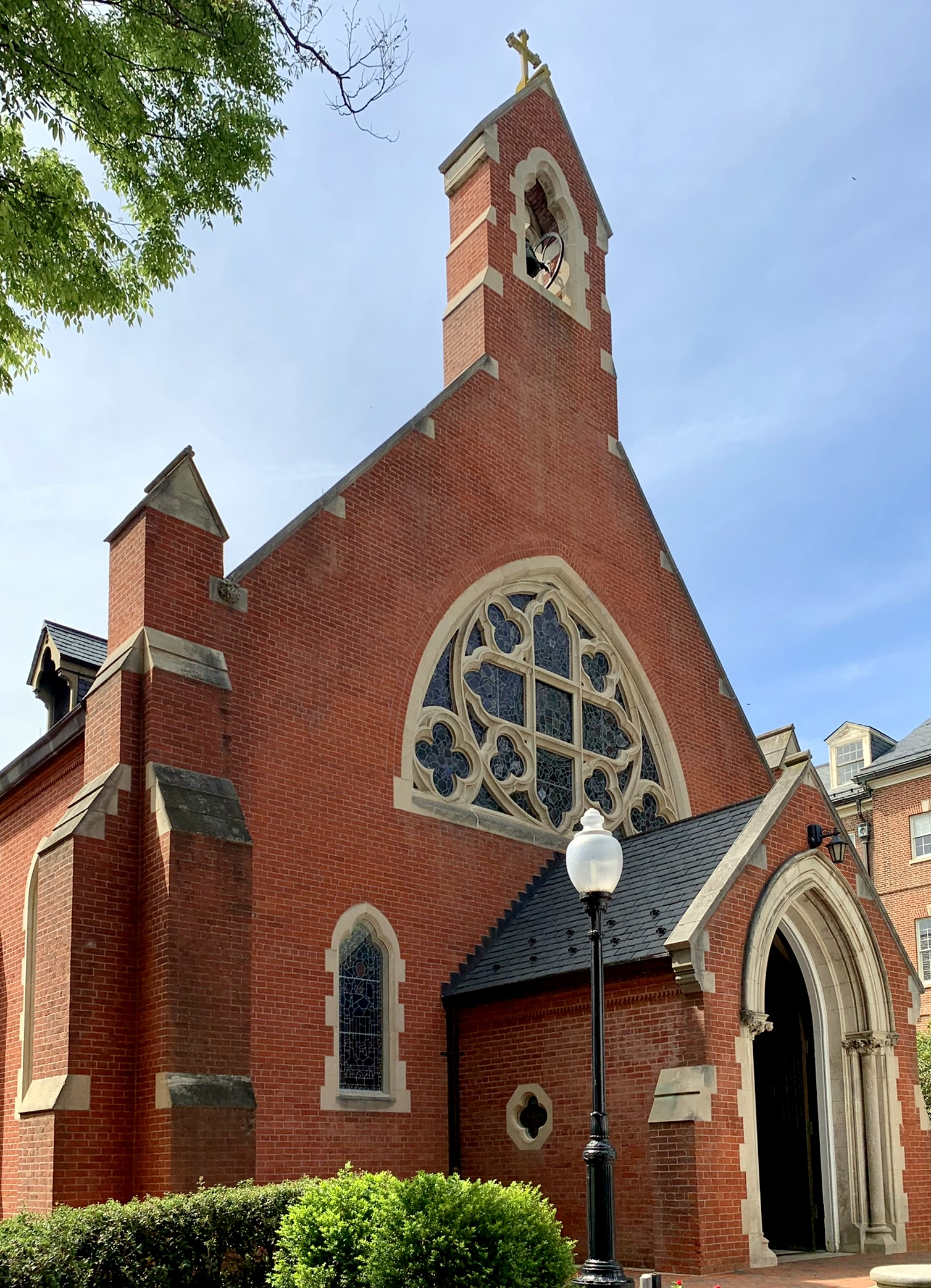
Dahlgren Chapel on the university campus

Georgetown University was founded by former Jesuits in the tradition of Ignatius of Loyola; it is a member of the Association of Jesuit Colleges and Universities. Georgetown is not a pontifical university, though seven Jesuits serve on the 36 member Board of Directors, the university's governing body.

Catholic spaces at the university, including Dahlgren Chapel, the university's principal place of Catholic worship, fall within the territorial jurisdiction of the Archdiocese of Washington,

Fifty-two members of the Society of Jesus live on campus, and are employed by Georgetown mostly as professors or administrators. Jesuit Heritage Week has been held every year since 2001 to celebrate the contributions of Jesuits to the Georgetown tradition.

Georgetown's Catholic heritage has been controversial at times, even though its influence is relatively limited. Stores in university-owned buildings are prohibited from selling or distributing birth control products.

The university hosts the Cardinal O'Connor Conference on Life annually in January to discuss the pro-life movement. Georgetown University Medical Center and Georgetown University Hospital, operated by MedStar Health, are prohibited from performing abortions. However, as of 2004, the hospital was performing research using embryonic stem cells.

Between 1996 and 1999, the administration added crucifixes to many classroom walls, a change that attracted national attention. Before 1996, crucifixes had hung only in hospital rooms and historic classrooms. Some of these crucifixes are historic works of art, and are noted as such.

In May 2004, Imam Yahya Hendi, the school's on-campus Muslim cleric, faced pressure to remove crucifixes while he and other campus faith leaders defended their placement. The Edward B. Bunn, S.J. Intercultural Center rotates displays of various faith and culture symbols in its lobby.

In September 2005, Georgetown was criticized by religious groups, including the Cardinal Newman Society, for not following the teachings of the church and hosting pro-abortion rights speakers, including John Kerry and Barack Obama.

In 2009, Georgetown's religious symbols were brought back to national attention after the university administration covered-up the name of Jesus in preparation for then President Barack Obama's speech on campus.

In May 2012, Washington's Archbishop Donald Wuerl criticized the university for inviting pro-abortion rights Kathleen Sebelius to be a commencement speaker.

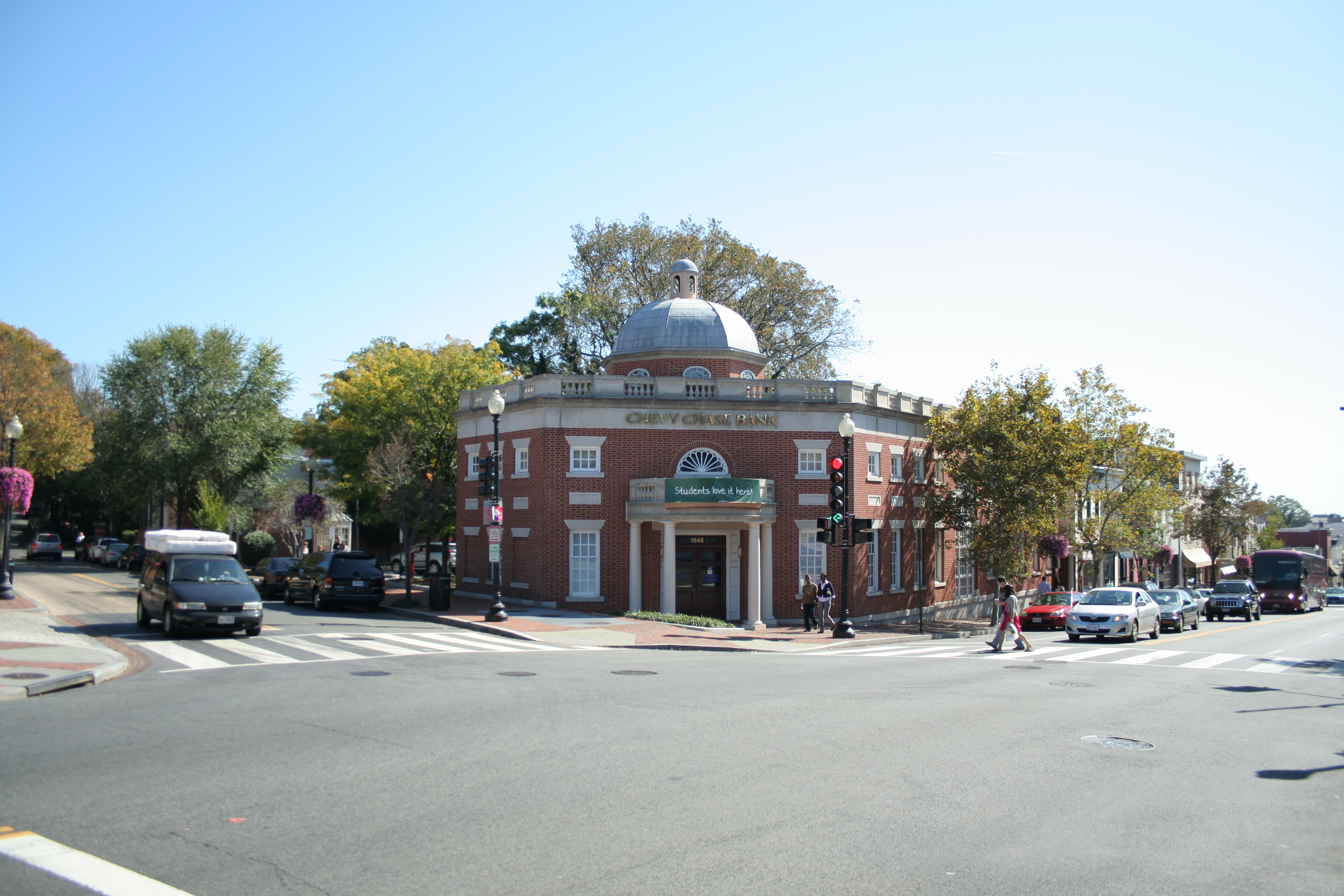
Georgetown neighborhood

In August 2013, religious groups denounced Georgetown for allowing gay-themed events, including a performance, during which "a male student went as a high-heeled Mary and danced to Madonna's "Like a Virgin" while Jesus (a woman) looked on."

== Academics ==
Georgetown University schools
School	Founded
College of Arts & Sciences	1789
Graduate School of Arts & Sciences	1820
School of Medicine	1851
Law Center	1870
Berkley School of Nursing	1903
Walsh School of Foreign Service	1919
School of Dentistry (defunct) (Note: The School of Dentistry was founded in 1901 as a department of the School of Medicine, and was elevated to a school in 1951. The school was disestablished in 1990.)	1951
School of Continuing Studies	1956
McDonough School of Business	1957
School of Languages and Linguistics (defunct) (Note: The School of Languages and Linguistics was created out of the School of Foreign Service in 1949 as the Institute of Languages and Linguistics. It was elevated to a school in 1959. In 1994, the school was subsumed primarily by the College of Arts & Sciences.)	1959
Georgetown University in Qatar	2005
McCourt School of Public Policy	2013
School of Health	2022

As of 2017, the university had 7,463 undergraduate students and 11,542 graduate students. In 2024, there were 20,031 students in the fall enrollment including 7,833 undergraduates and 12,198 graduate and professional students.

Bachelor's programs are offered through College of Arts & Sciences, the School of Nursing, the McDonough School of Business, the School of Continuing Studies, the School of Health, and the Walsh School of Foreign Service, which includes the Qatar campus.

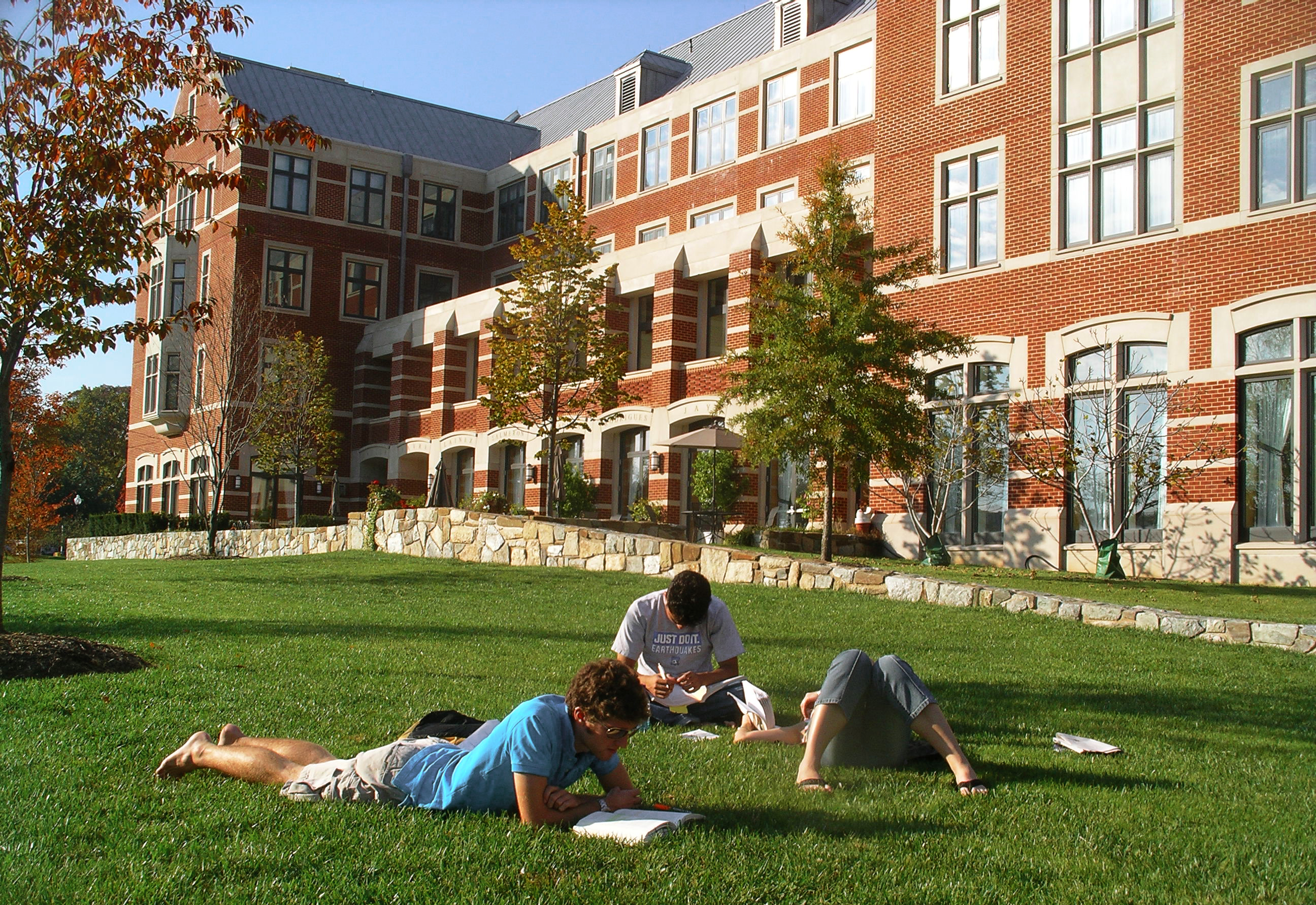
Students studying outside Wolfington Hall Jesuit Residence

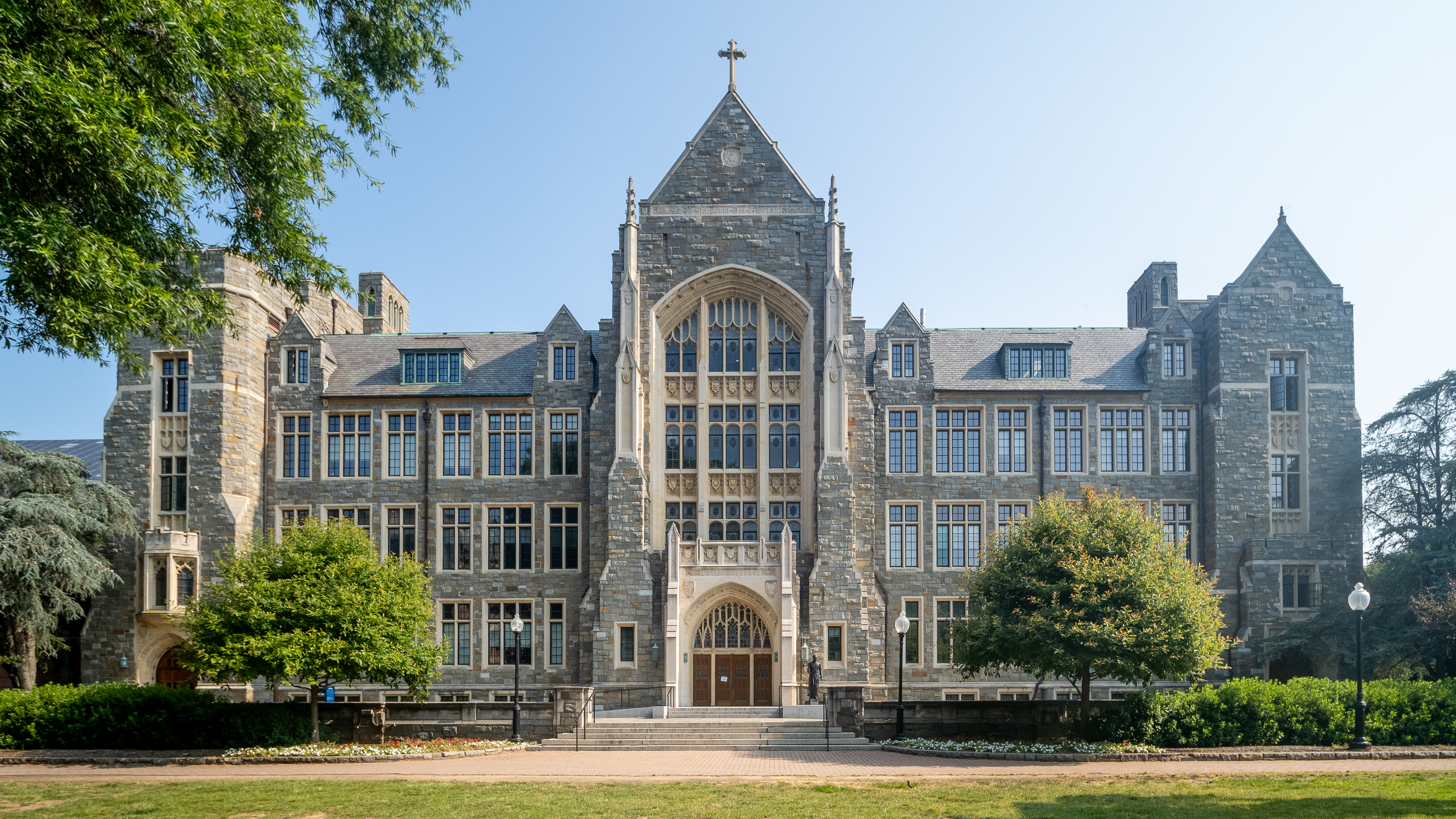
White-Gravenor Hall hosts the Office of Undergraduate Admissions.

Master's and doctoral programs are offered through the Graduate School of Arts & Sciences, the Law Center, the School of Medicine, the McCourt School of Public Policy, and the School of Continuing Studies. Master's students occasionally share some advanced seminars with undergraduates, and most undergraduate schools offer abbreviated bachelor's and master's programs following completion of the undergraduate degree. The McDonough School of Business and the Edmund A. Walsh School of Foreign Service both offer master's programs. The School of Foreign Service is renowned for its academic programs in international affairs. The Center for Contemporary Arab Studies also offer a Master's of Arab Studies, as well as certificates.

Each graduate school offers at least one double degree with another graduate school. Additionally, the Law Center offers a joint degree with the Johns Hopkins Bloomberg School of Public Health. The School of Continuing Studies includes the Center for Continuing and Professional Education, and operates four types of degree programs, over thirty professional certificates and non-degree courses, undergraduate and graduate degrees in Liberal Studies, as well as summer courses for graduates, undergraduates, and high school students. The School of Dentistry closed in 1990 after 89 years in operation.

=== Rankings and admissions ===
Academic rankings

National
- Forbes: 31
- U.S. News & World Report: 23 (tie)
- Washington Monthly: 49
- WSJ/College Pulse: 34

Global
- ARWU: 501–600
- QS: 285 (tie)
- THE: 201–250
- U.S. News & World Report: 302 (tie)

Undergraduate admissions statistics
- 2021 entering class
- Admit rate: 11.7% (▼ −4.7)
- Yield rate: 48.4% (▲ +1.8)

Test scores middle 50%
- SAT EBRW: 700–770
- SAT Math: 690–780
- ACT Composite: 32–34

High school GPA^{[ii]}
- Top 10%: 87%
- Top 25%: 97%
- Top 50%: 99%

Admission to Georgetown has been deemed "most selective" by U.S. News & World Report, with the university receiving 27,650 applications and admitting 11.7% of those who applied for the Class of 2025. As of 2024, Georgetown's graduate schools have acceptance rates of 2.8% to the School of Medicine, 12.9% to the Law Center, 25% to the MSFS, and 35% to the MBA program. In 2004, a National Bureau of Economic Research study on revealed preference of U.S. colleges showed Georgetown was the 16th most-preferred choice.

The School of Foreign Service's (SFS) master's and bachelor's programs in international relations were ranked first in the world by Foreign Policy in 2024. SFS's undergraduate programs were also ranked first in the United States for international affairs by Niche. The McCourt School of Public Policy is ranked fourth in global policy and administration studies by US News & World Report. In the same report, the Medical School is ranked 44th in research and 87th in primary care, and the McDonough School of Business ranks 24th in MBA programs and 14th in undergraduate programs. In 2024, Poets & Quants ranked Georgetown's undergraduate business programs third in the country. Georgetown University Law Center is ranked 14th in the United States and 12th in the world, as well as first in clinical training and part-time law, second in tax law, third in international law, fifth in criminal law, seventh in health care law, ninth in constitutional law, and tenth in environmental law.

The undergraduate schools maintain a restrictive Early Action admissions program, as students who have applied through an Early Decision process at another school are not permitted to apply early to Georgetown. 94% of students accepted for the class of 2017 were in the top 10% of their class and the interquartile range of SAT scores was 700–770 in Reading/Writing and 680–780 in Math. Georgetown accepts the SAT and ACT, though it does not consider the writing portion of either test. Over 55% of undergraduates receive financial aid, and the university meets 100% of demonstrated need, with an average financial aid package of $23,500 and about 70% of aid distributed in the form of grants or scholarships. Georgetown is need-blind for domestic applicants.

=== Faculty ===
As of 2017, Georgetown University employed 1,414 full-time and 1,196 part-time faculty members across its three Washington, D.C. campuses, with additional staff at Georgetown University in Qatar. In the fall of 2024, there were 5,869 full-time and 1,550 part time faculty members across all campuses. The faculty comprises leading academics and notable political and business leaders, and are predominantly male by a two-to-one margin.

Georgetown University's faculty members give more support to liberal candidates, and while their donation patterns are generally consistent with those of other American university faculties, they gave more than average to the Barack Obama 2008 presidential campaign.

The faculty includes former Society for Classical Studies president James J. O'Donnell, theologian John Haught, social activist Chai Feldblum, Nobel laureate George Akerlof, Dan David Prize winning historian Dagomar Degroot, writer and human rights advocate Carolyn Forché, award-winning literary critic Maureen Corrigan, linguist Deborah Tannen, business philosopher Jason Brennan, and hip hop scholar Michael Eric Dyson.

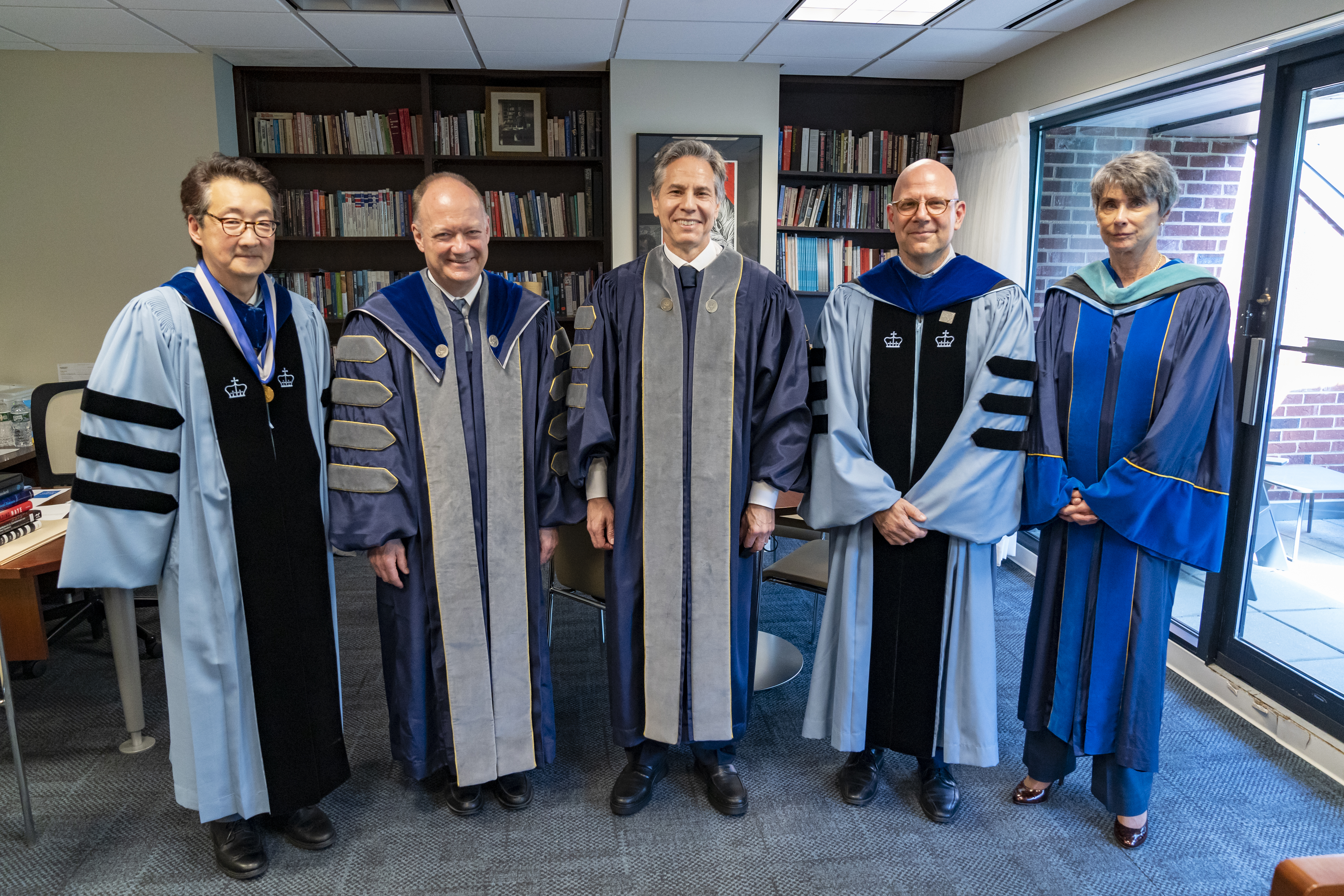
Antony Blinken, the U.S. secretary of state, meets with Georgetown faculty before commencement ceremonies.

Many former politicians choose to teach at Georgetown, including former Secretaries of State Madeleine Albright and Henry Kissinger, former U.S. Ambassador to the United Nations Jeane Kirkpatrick, U.S. Agency for International Development administrator Andrew Natsios, National Security Advisor Anthony Lake, and CIA director George Tenet. Former Supreme Court Justices William J. Brennan, Jr., Antonin Scalia, and John Roberts have each taught at the university. Former Solicitor General of the United States Paul Clement has been a member of the law faculty since leaving public office in 2008. Internationally, the school attracts former ambassadors and heads of state, including former Prime Minister of Spain José María Aznar, Saudi Ambassador Prince Turki Al-Faisal, President Laura Chinchilla of Costa Rica, and President of Colombia Álvaro Uribe.

=== Research ===
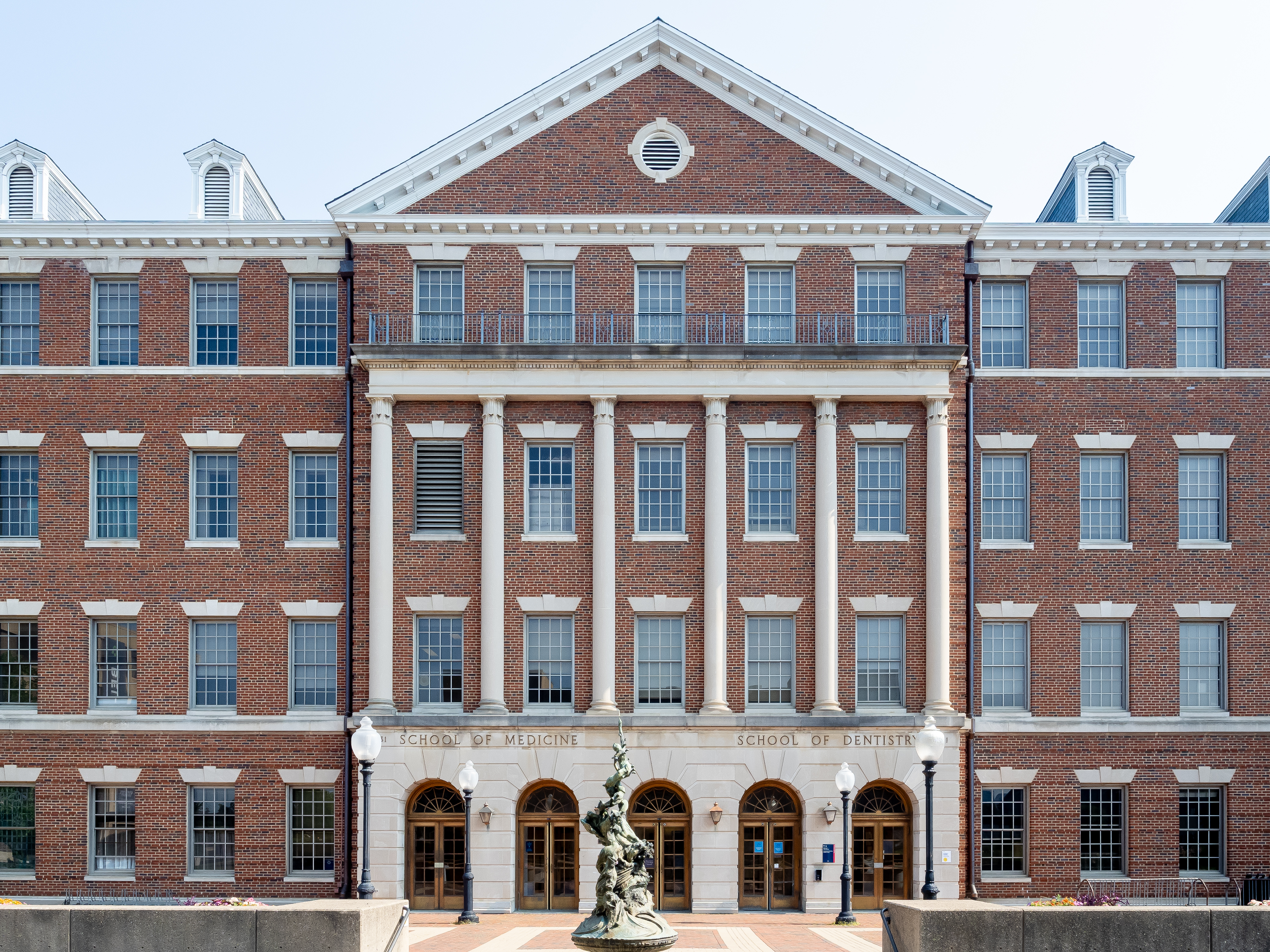
Georgetown Medical School accounts for a significant portion of the university's research funding, mostly received from the U.S. government.

Georgetown University is classified among "R1: Doctoral Universities – Very high research activity". As of 2014, Georgetown's libraries held over 3.5 million printed items, including 1.25 million e-books, in seven buildings, with most in Lauinger Library. The Blommer Science Library in the Reiss Science Building on campus, houses most of the Science collection. Additionally, the Law School campus includes the nation's fifth-largest law library as of 2007. Georgetown faculty conduct research in hundreds of subjects, but research priorities are in religion, ethics, science, public policy, and cancer medicine.

In 2019, Georgetown spent $240.9 million on research, ranking it 101st nationwide, with $94.0 million in federal funding. In 2007, it received about $14.8 million in federal funds for research, with 64% from the National Science Foundation, National Institutes of Health, the U.S. Department of Energy, and the U.S. Department of Defense. In 2010, the school received $5.6 million from the Department of Education to fund fellowships in several international studies fields. Georgetown's Lombardi Comprehensive Cancer Center is one of 41 research-intensive comprehensive cancer centers in the United States, and developed the breakthrough HPV vaccine for cervical cancer, and conditionally reprogrammed cells (CRC) technology.

In 2024, Georgetown spent a total of $376.6 million on research with $145.787 million in federal funding, ranking 91st nationwide. The university will lose about $35 million in federal research grants and expects a 20% decline in international graduate student enrollment due to immigration uncertainties.

==== Academic publications ====
Centers that conduct and sponsor research at Georgetown include the Berkley Center for Religion, Peace, and World Affairs, the Prince Alwaleed Center for Muslim–Christian Understanding and the Woodstock Theological Center. Regular publications include the Georgetown Journal on Poverty Law and Policy, the Kennedy Institute of Ethics Journal, The Georgetown Law Journal, the Georgetown Journal of International Affairs, and the Georgetown Public Policy Review.

== Campuses ==
Georgetown University has four campuses in Washington, D.C.: the undergraduate campus located in the neighborhood of Georgetown, the Medical Center, the School of Continuing Studies (in Chinatown) and the Law Center. The undergraduate campus and Medical Center are together in the Georgetown neighborhood in the Northwest Quadrant of Washington and form the main campus. Other centers are located around Washington, D.C., including the Center for Continuing and Professional Education at Clarendon in Arlington County, Virginia. Transit between these locations and the Washington Metro is supplied by a system of shuttles, known as GUTS buses. Georgetown also has branches of the School of Foreign Service in Doha, Qatar, and Jakarta, Indonesia, as well as villas in Alanya, Turkey, and Fiesole, Italy. In their campus layout, Georgetown's administrators consistently used the traditional quadrangle design.

=== Main campus ===
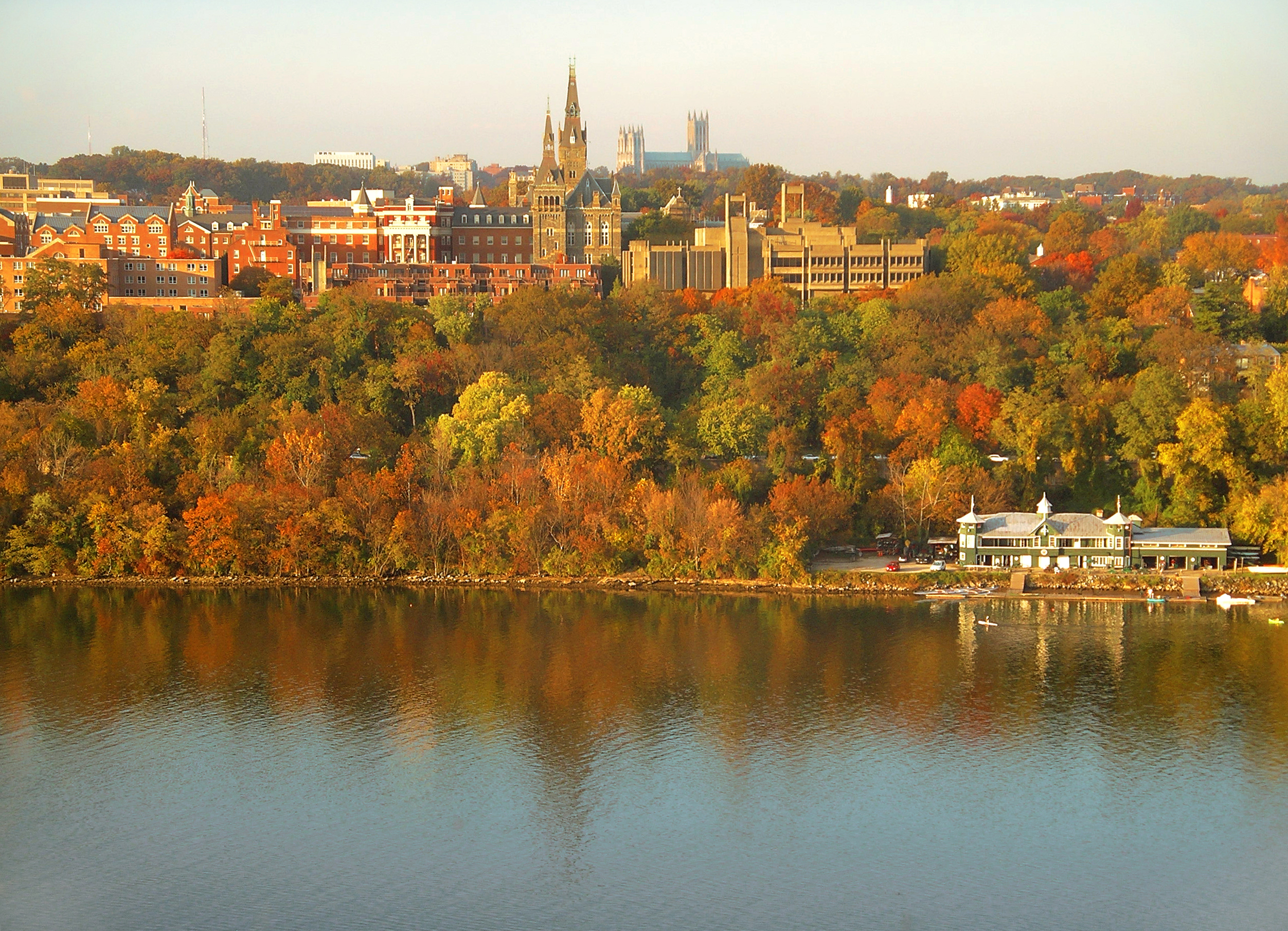
Georgetown's campus is built on a rise above the Potomac River.

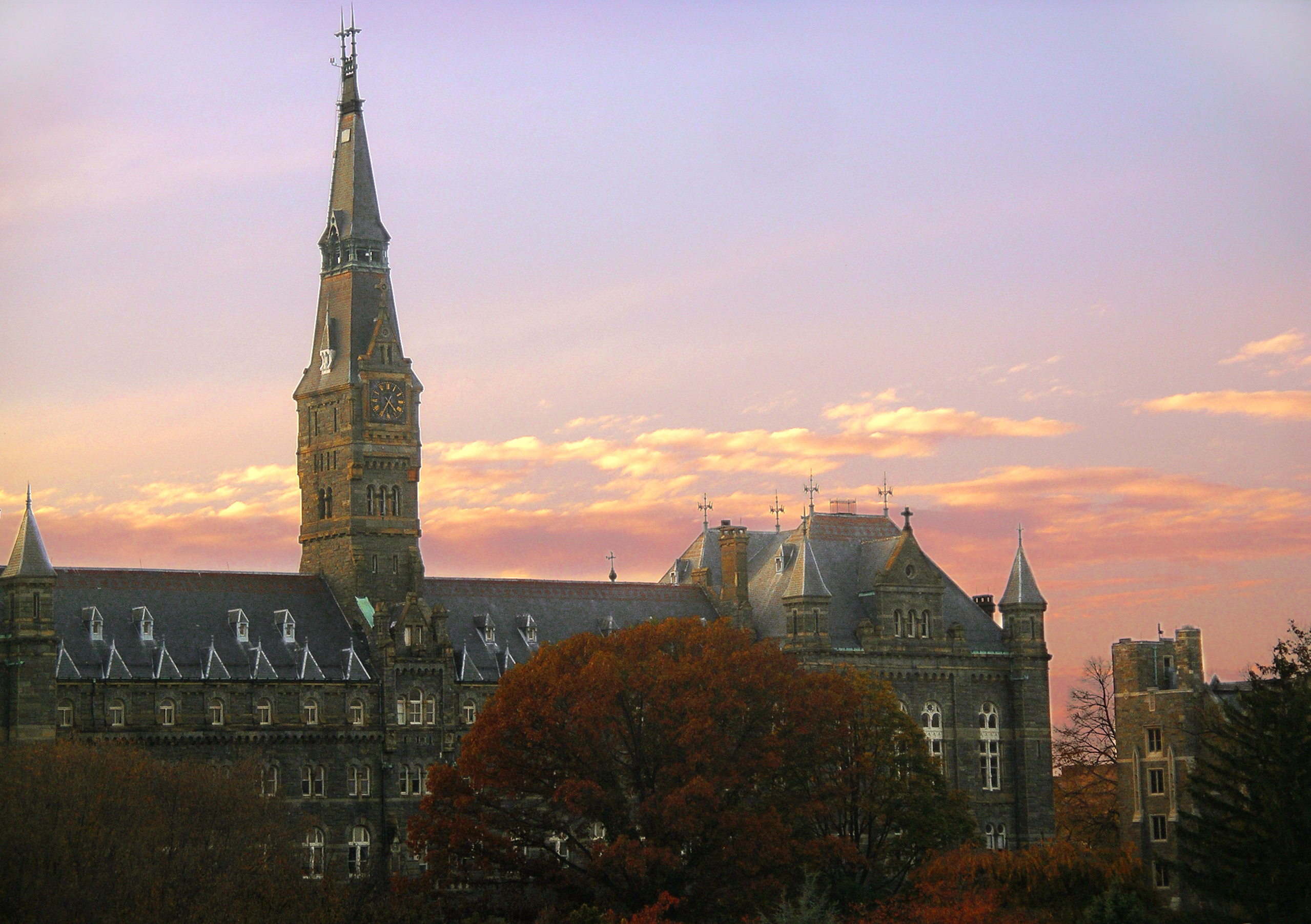
Healy Hall at sunset

Georgetown's undergraduate and medical school campuses are situated on an elevated site above the Potomac River overlooking Northern Virginia. Because of this, Georgetown University is often referred to as "The Hilltop". The main gates, known as the Healy Gates, are located at the intersection of 37th and O Streets NW, and lead directly to the heart of campus. The main campus is relatively compact, being 104 acres (0.4 km^{2}) in area, but includes fifty-four buildings, student residences and apartments capable of accommodating 80% of undergraduates, and various athletic facilities. Campus green areas include fountains, a cemetery, large clusters of flowers, groves of trees, and open quadrangles. New buildings and major renovations are required to meet LEED Silver criteria, and the campus was nominated for the District Sustainability People's Choice Award in 2018.

Healy Hall, designed by Paul J. Pelz in Neo-Medieval style and built from 1877 to 1879, is the architectural gem of Georgetown's campus, and is a National Historic Landmark. Within Healy Hall are a number of notable rooms including Gaston Hall, Riggs Library, and the Bioethics Library Hirst Reading Room. Both Healy Hall and the Georgetown University Astronomical Observatory, built in 1844, are listed on the National Register of Historic Places.

In addition to the front lawn, the main campus has traditionally centered on Dahlgren Quadrangle behind Healy Hall, which is home to Dahlgren Chapel; however, in recent decades, Red Square has replaced the Dahlgren Quadrangle as a center of student life. North of Red Square is an extended pathway that is home to buildings such as the Intercultural Center (ICC), the Reiss Science building, the newly constructed dormitory named after Pedro Arrupe, and the large Leavey Student Center.

The medical school is located in the northwestern part of the main campus on Reservoir Road. It is integrated with Georgetown University Hospital.

In the 21st-century, the West side of the Hilltop has emerged as a newly developing area of the main campus. The university completed the Southwest Quadrangle Project in late 2003 and brought a new 907-bed upperclassmen residence hall, the Leo J. O'Donovan dining hall, a large underground parking facility, and a new Jesuit Residence to the campus. The school's first performing arts center, named for Royden B. Davis, was completed in November 2005. The new business school headquarters, named for Rafik Hariri, opened in Fall 2009, and Regents Hall, the new science building, opened in Fall 2012. Along with the adjacent Leavey Student Center, these two large buildings have become popular study spaces and overlook a newly developed scenic lawn space.

In the fall of 2014, the university opened a new student center, the Healey Family Student Center (HFSC) to complement the longstanding Leavey Center. The Healey Family Student Center is located on the first floor of New South Hall, a space that functioned as the university's main dining facility until the Leo J. O'Donovan dining hall opening in 2003. It features over 43,000 square feet including several study spaces, conference rooms, dance, and music studios, as well as a pub called Bulldog Tavern and the salad store Hilltoss, which is operated by The Corp.

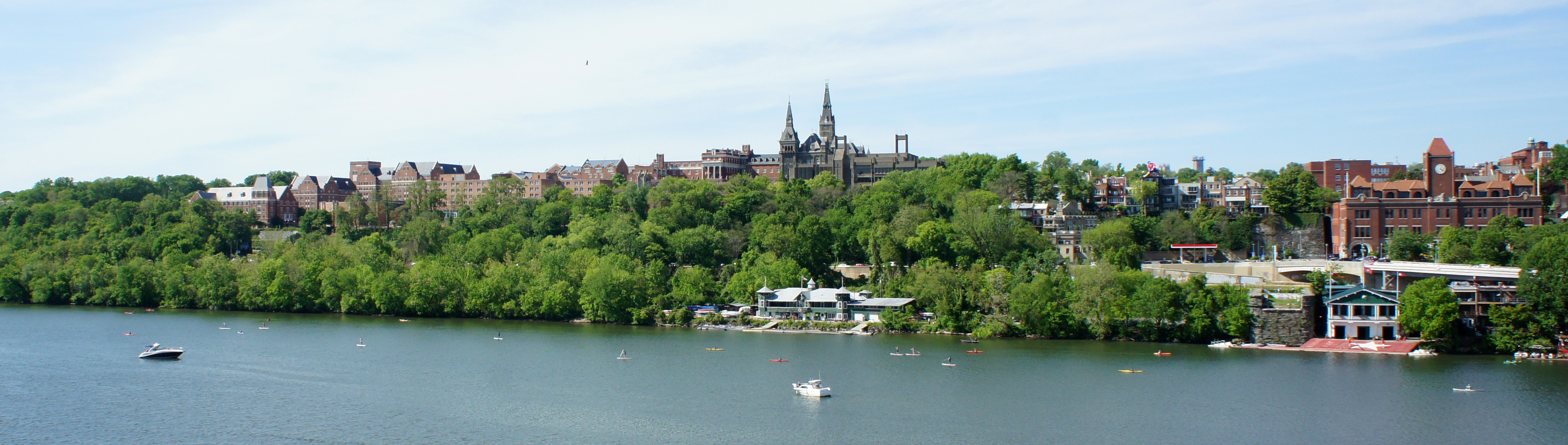
A panoramic photo of the campus along the Potomac River seen from Key Bridge, which connects Georgetown with Rosslyn, Virginia

As a location, Georgetown was ranked nationally as the second-best college town by The Princeton Review in 2011. The Georgetown neighborhood west of Wisconsin Avenue NW is dominated by the presence of university students. Students have easy access to the M Street commercial area, the Georgetown Waterfront, and numerous trails that lead to the National Mall and other parks. Despite this, "town and gown" relations between the university communities and other Georgetown residents are often strained by facilities construction, enlargement of the student body, as well as noise and alcohol violations. Several groups of neighborhood residents have attempted to slow University growth in Georgetown, creating friction between students and the surrounding neighborhood. Despite the relative safety of the neighborhood, crime is a persistent issue, with campus security responding to 257 crimes in 2008, the majority of which were petty crimes.

=== Law Center campus ===
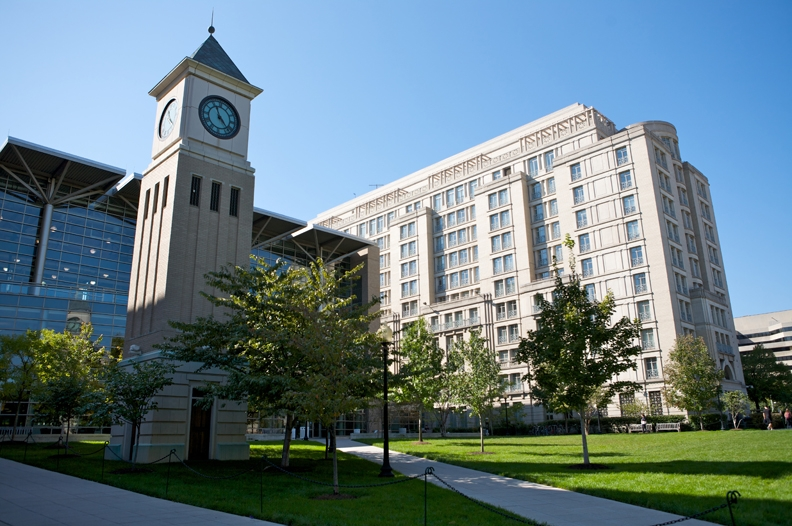
Georgetown Law School's campus on Capitol Hill

The Law Center campus is located in the Capitol Hill neighborhood on New Jersey Avenue, near Washington Union Station, and consists of five buildings. First-year students at the Law Center can live in the single on-campus dormitory, the Gewirz Student Center. Most second- and third-year students, as well as some first-year students, live off-campus. As there is little housing near the Law Center, most are spread throughout the Washington metropolitan area.

The Campus Completion Project, finished in 2005, saw the addition of the Hotung International Building and the Sport and Fitness Center. G Street and F Street are closed off between 1st and 2nd Streets to create open lawns flanking McDonough Hall, the main building on the campus. In 2019, the university purchased $70 million of a building at 500 First St. NW to add to the Georgetown University Law Center. Opening in 2020, the 130,000-square-foot edifice will provide classrooms and offices for researchers in health, technology, law and other fields.

In September 2024, the McCourt School of Public Policy opened a new building located across from the Georgetown University Law Center. The 150,000 square foot building holds 20 classrooms, a 280-seat rooftop venue as well as a 400-set auditorium.

=== Downtown campus ===
In 2013, Georgetown University School of Continuing Studies opened in Downtown Washington, D.C.

The School of Continuing Studies (SCS) campus is located in a 95,000 square foot, state-of-the-art building in downtown Washington, D.C. The campus currently serves as the home for Georgetown's graduate programs in fields such as Applied Intelligence, Journalism, Public Relations, Real Estate, Sports Industry Management, and Urban & Regional Planning.

The current building, which was completed in 2013, includes 30 classrooms, a 125-person auditorium, a digital media lab, a broadcast studio, an interfaith chapel, and a dedicated library. It is located in the Chinatown neighborhood of the city and is considered to be one of the most accessible locations in town, with a Transit Score of 100 and a Walk Score of 98. It is also located just a few blocks away from the Capital One Arena, the home court of the men's basketball team.

=== Qatar campus ===
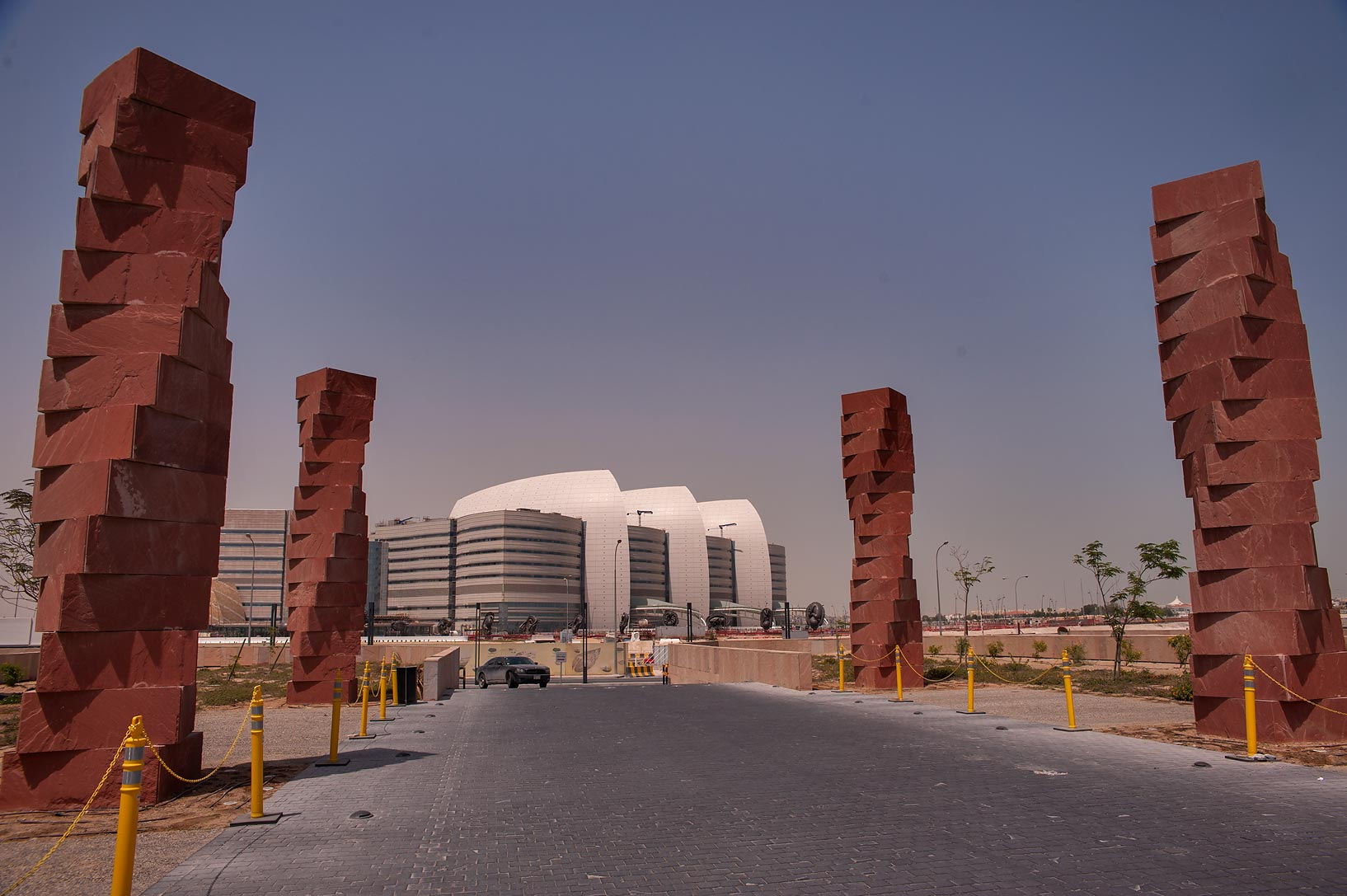
Entrance to Georgetown University's Qatar Campus in Doha Education City

In 2002, the Qatar Foundation for Education, Science and Community Development presented the School of Foreign Service with the resources and space to open a campus in Education City in Al Rayyan, Qatar. SFS-Qatar opened in 2005 as a liberal arts and international affairs undergraduate school for regional students. It offers the same Bachelor of Science in Foreign Service (BSFS) as the main campus, in addition to three certificates. In 2026, new programmes were launched at the Qatar Campus including a major in Science, Technology, and International Affairs (STIA), and minors in Heritage, Art, Women’s and Gender Studies, as well as Cultural Diplomacy. The campus also offers a one-year Executive Master’s in Diplomacy and International Affairs (EMDIA) which is designed for the Diplomatic Institute of the Qatari Ministry of Foreign Affairs (MoFA). Apart from language courses, including Arabic and French, all courses are taught in English and the curriculum and course materials in the specified majors are identical to those offered at Georgetown's main campus in Washington D.C. Georgetown University is responsible for admissions and the curriculum of the campus and the Qatar Foundation is the owner and operator of the facilities. Georgetown University also retains the responsibility for the hiring of faculty. On 16 April 2025, Georgetown University and the Qatar Foundation signed a ten-year renewal agreement and celebrated the GU-Q’s 20 year anniversary. GU-Q students are eligible for enrollment in approved courses at various partner universities within Education City, and can participate in semester-long exchanges between Georgetown University campuses in Washington D.C. and Doha.

=== Facilities abroad ===
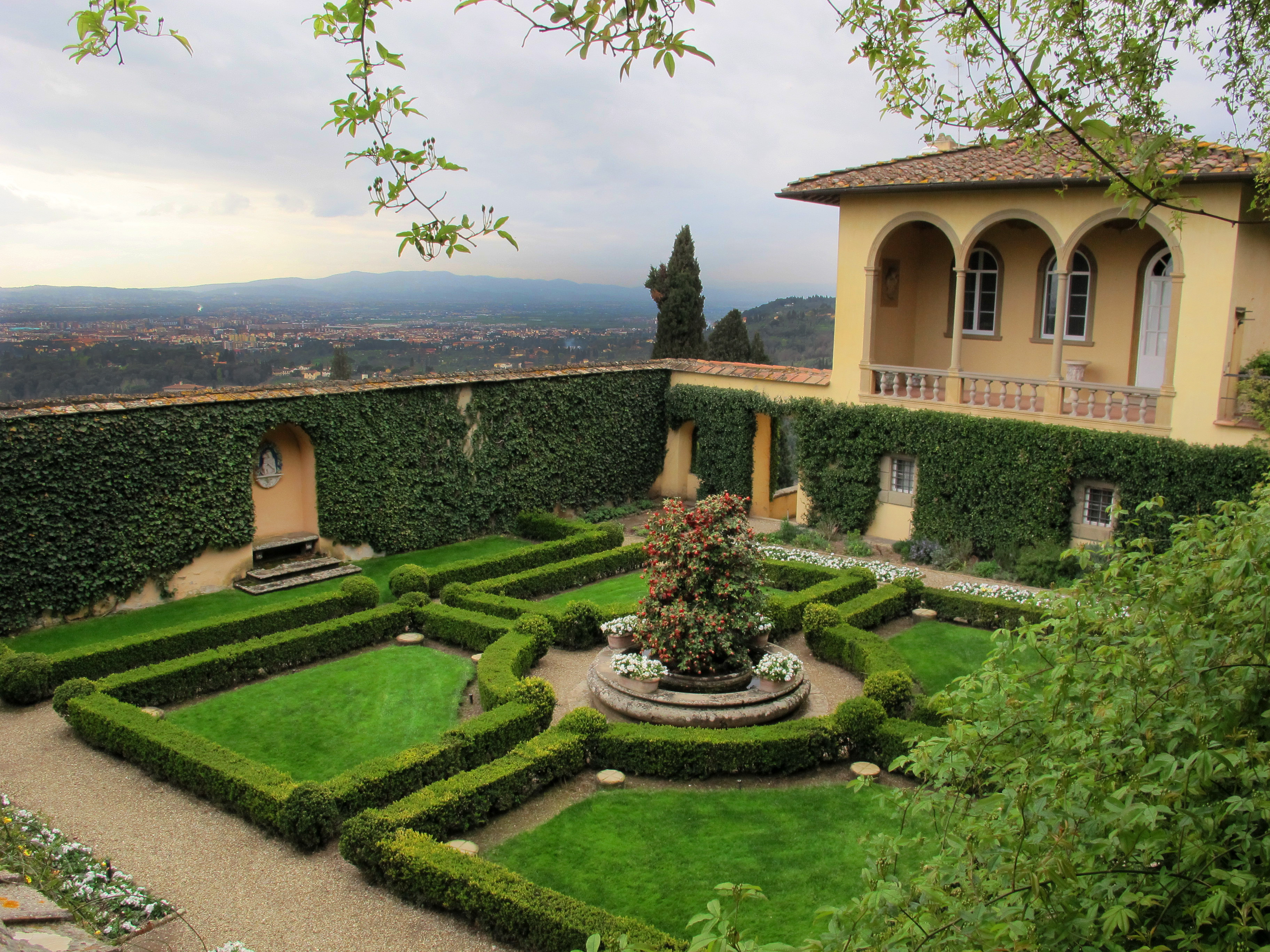
Villa Le Balze in Fiesole, Italy, hosting interdisciplinary studies

In December 1979, the Marquesa Margaret Rockefeller de Larrain, granddaughter of John D. Rockefeller, gave the Villa Le Balze to Georgetown University. The Villa is in Fiesole, Italy, on a hill above the city of Florence. The Villa is used year-round for study abroad programs focused on specialized interdisciplinary study of Italian culture and civilization.

The main facility for the McGhee Center for Eastern Mediterranean Studies was donated to Georgetown in 1989 by alumnus and former United States Ambassador to Turkey George C. McGhee. The school is in the town of Alanya, Turkey within the Seljuq-era Alanya Castle, on the Mediterranean. The center operates study abroad programs one semester each year, concentrating on Turkish language, architectural history, and Islamic studies. In 2016, the McGhee center was closed.

In December 2007, Georgetown opened a liaison office in Shanghai, China to coordinate with Fudan University and others. In 2008, the Georgetown University Law Center in conjunction with an international consortium of law schools established the Center for Transnational Legal Studies in London, England. The Center offers semester-long study in international, comparative, and transnational law as well as offering partnerships with more than 20 law schools.

In November 2023, Indonesian President Joko Widodo announced Georgetown plans to open a satellite campus of the School of Foreign Service in Jakarta that will offer degree programs for present and future policymakers in the United States and Southeast Asia. The campus, known as Georgetown SFS Asia-Pacific (GSAP), was launched in January 2025. The GSAP offers a Master in Diplomacy and International Affairs (MDIA), graduate studies, policy labs, and research initiatives

Georgetown University's McDonough School of Business operates at the Dubai International Financial Centre Academy in the United Arab Emirates.

In July 2026, the Greece Minister of Education approved the Georgetown Earth Commons Greece environmental research and education initiative in Athens Greece. The Georgetown and University of Athens faculty lead the courses for environment and sustainability.

== Student life ==
Student body composition as of May 2, 2022
Race and ethnicity	Total
White	49%
Foreign national	14%
Asian	12%
Hispanic	10%
Other (Note: Other consists of Multiracial Americans & those who prefer to not say.)	8%
Black	7%
Economic diversity
Low-income (Note: The percentage of students who received an income-based federal Pell grant intended for low-income students.)	14%

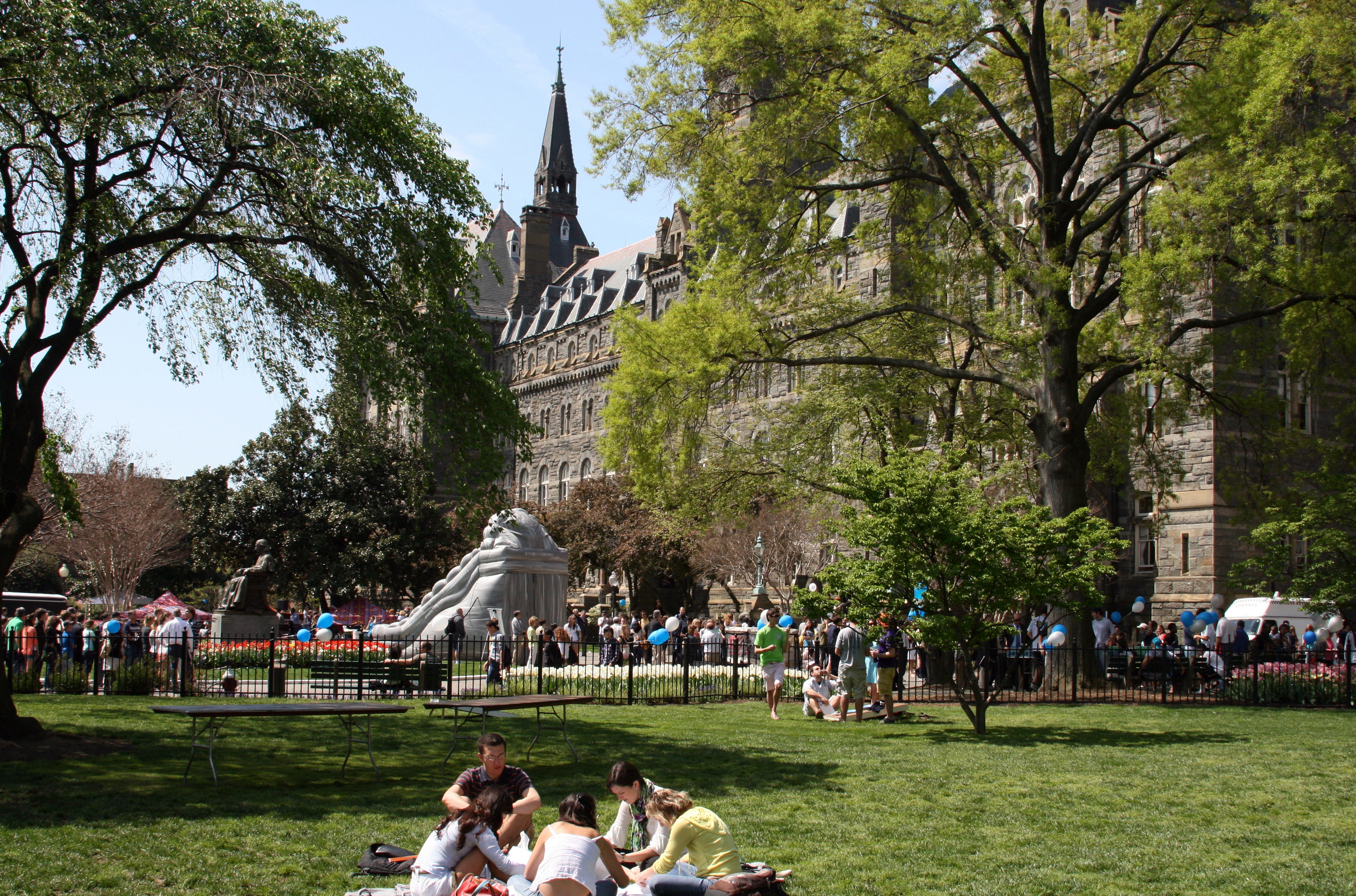
Students celebrate Georgetown Day in late spring with a campus carnival.

The Georgetown undergraduate student body, at 6,926 as of 2016, is composed primarily of students from outside the District of Columbia area, with 33% of new 2016 students coming from the Mid-Atlantic states, 11% being international students, and the remainder coming from other areas of the U.S. The student body also represented 129 countries, with 11% being international, including over 330 undergraduate and 1,050 graduate students who chose to come to Georgetown as a study abroad destination in 2009–10. In 2014–2015, the racial diversity of the undergraduate student body was 57.0% white, 8.8% Asian, 6.2% black, and 7.5% Hispanic. The median family income of Georgetown students is $229,100, with 51% of students coming from the top 5% highest-earning families and 13.5% from the bottom 60%. 55.1% of undergraduates are female.

Although it is a Jesuit university, only 41% of the student body identify as Catholic, while 22% identify as Protestant as of 2009. Georgetown employs a full-time rabbi, as 6.5% of undergraduates are Jewish. It was the first U.S. college to have a full-time imam, to serve the over four hundred Muslims on campus, and in 2014, they appointed their first Hindu priest to serve a weekly community of around one hundred. Georgetown also sponsors student groups for Baháʼí, Buddhist, and Mormon traditions. The student body consists of both religious and non-religious students, and more than four-hundred freshmen and transfer students attend a nonreligious Ignatian retreat, called ESCAPE, annually.

A 2007 survey of undergraduates also suggests that 62.8% are sexually active, and 6.2% identify as LGBTQ. Three quarters of a 2009 survey considered homophobia a campus problem. Newsweek, however, rated Georgetown among its top "Gay-Friendly Schools" in 2010.

A survey by the school in 2016 showed that 31% of female undergraduates reported experiencing unwanted sexual contact, and 86% of LGBTQ students reported some form of sexual harassment at the college. In 2011, College Magazine ranked Georgetown as the tenth most hipster U.S. college, while People for the Ethical Treatment of Animals considered it the third most vegan friendly small U.S. school.

Almost all undergraduates attend full-time. A majority of undergraduates, 76%, live on-campus in several dormitories and apartment complexes, including all underclassmen. As of 2011, 1255 undergraduates and 339 graduate students live off-campus, mostly in the Georgetown, Glover Park, Burleith, and Foxhall neighborhoods. Since Fall 2022, housing is available for on-campus graduate students at 55 H St. NW, which is 30 minute from the Hilltop campus via the Georgetown University Transportation Shuttle (GUTS). Students at the Law Center are accommodated at the Gewirz Student Center. All students in the Medical School live off-campus, most in the surrounding neighborhoods, with some in Northern Virginia and elsewhere through the DMV region.

=== Student groups ===
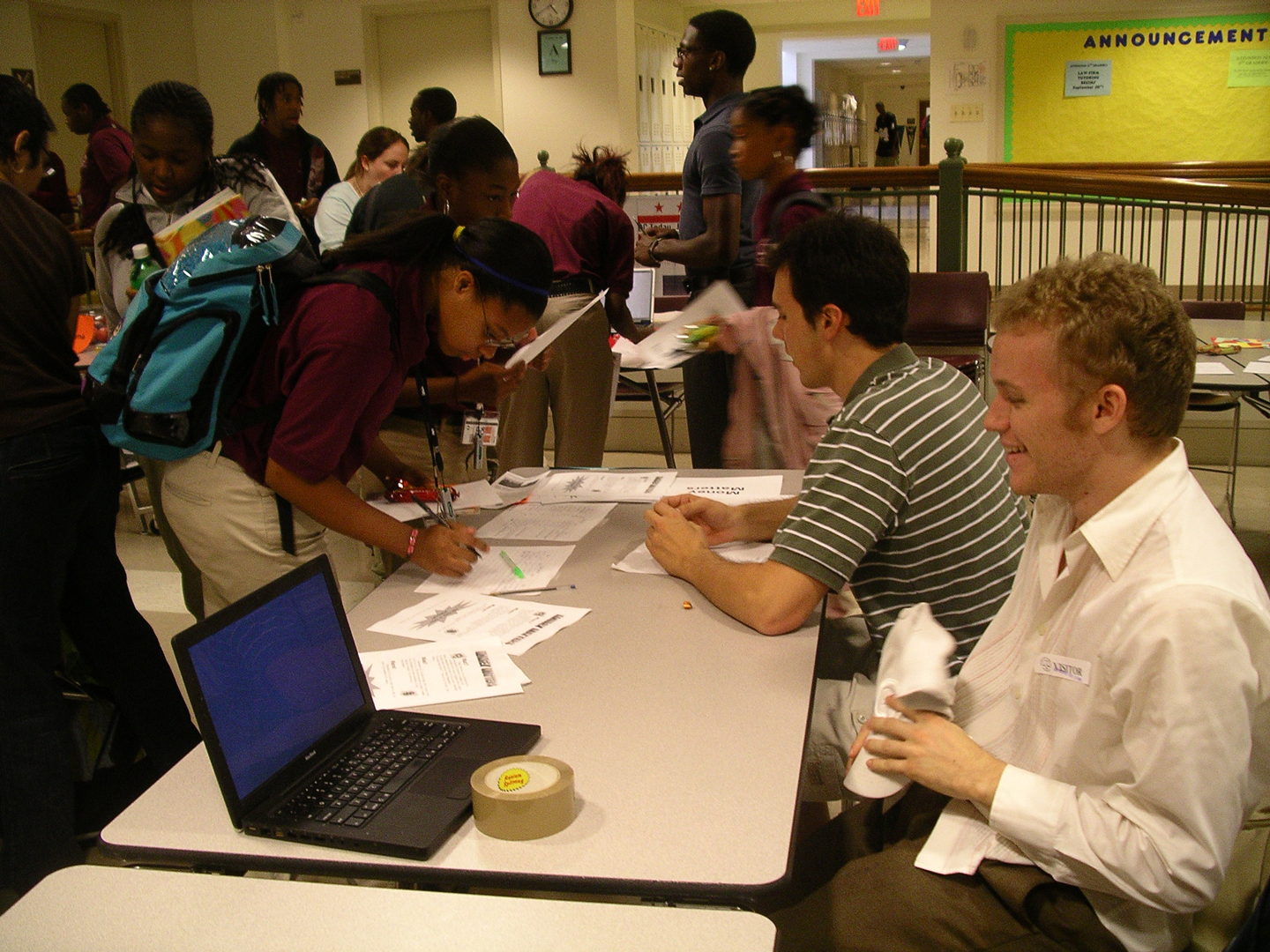
Students volunteering at a Washington, D.C. school

As of 2012, 92.9% of Georgetown University undergraduates are involved in at least one of the 179 registered student organizations which cover a variety of interests: student government, club sports, media and publications, performing arts, religion, and volunteer and service. Students also operate campus stores, banks, and medical services. Students often find their interests at the Student Activities Commission Club Fair, where both official and unofficial organizations set up tables. The Georgetown University Student Association is the student government organization for undergraduates. There are also elected student representatives within the schools that serve on Academic councils, as well as to the university Board of Directors, and, since 1996, to the Georgetown Advisory Neighborhood Commission.

Georgetown's student organizations include one of the nation's oldest debating clubs, the Philodemic Society, founded in 1830, and the oldest university theater group, the Mask and Bauble Dramatic Society. Nomadic Theatre was founded in 1982 as an alternative troupe without an on-campus home. The Georgetown Improv Association, founded in 1995, performs improvisational shows on-campus at Bulldog Alley in addition to hosting "Improvfest", one of the oldest improv festivals in the country.

The Model United Nations team that is run by the Georgetown International Relations Club, the largest club on campus, and its affiliate, Georgetown International Relations Association, has attained the status of best in the world on several occasions.

There are seven a cappella groups on campus, including The Georgetown Saxatones, The Georgetown Chimes, the Phantoms, Superfood, The GraceNotes, the Chamber Singers, Essence, Harmony, and the Capitol G's. These groups perform annually at the "D.C. A Cappella Festival", held since 1991; the "Cherry Tree Massacre" concert series, held since 1974; and "Spring Sing", held since 2011. The Georgetown University Band is composed of the Georgetown Pep Band and the Georgetown Wind Ensemble, and performs on campus, in Washington, D.C., and at post-season basketball tournaments.

In addition to student organizations and clubs, Georgetown University is home to one of the nation's largest entirely student-owned and -operated corporations, Students of Georgetown, Inc. Founded in 1972, "The Corp" operates three coffee shops, two grocery stores, the Hilltoss, a concept similar to Sweetgreen, catering services, and seasonal storage for students. The business has annual revenues of about $5 million, and surpluses are directly re-invested into the Georgetown student body through Corp Philanthropy, which gave out over $85,000 in scholarships and donations to Georgetown groups in 2014–2015. Georgetown University Alumni & Student Federal Credit Union is the largest all student-run credit union in the United States, with over $17 million in assets and 12,000 members. The Georgetown University Student Investment Fund is one of a few undergraduate-run investment funds in the United States, and hosted the taping of an episode of a CNBC's program related to finance in September 2006. Hilltop Consultants is a student-run nonprofit consulting agency that works with local and international organizations including Teach For America, Habitat for Humanity, and Special Olympics. The Hilltop Microfinance Initiative is a student-run micro-finance organization, aiming to empower underserved communities in DC, Maryland, and Virginia through small business loans and financial coaching.

Another student-run group, the Georgetown Emergency Response Medical Service, "GERMS", is an all-volunteer ambulance service founded in 1982 that serves campus and the surrounding communities. Georgetown's Army Reserve Officer Training Corps (ROTC) unit, the Hoya Battalion, is the oldest military unit native to the District of Columbia, and was awarded the top ranking among ROTC programs in 2012. The proportion of ROTC students at Georgetown was the 79th highest among universities in the United States as of 2010. GUGS, the Georgetown University Grilling Society, has been a Georgetown tradition since 2002, selling half-pound hamburgers in Red Square on most Fridays.

=== Activism ===
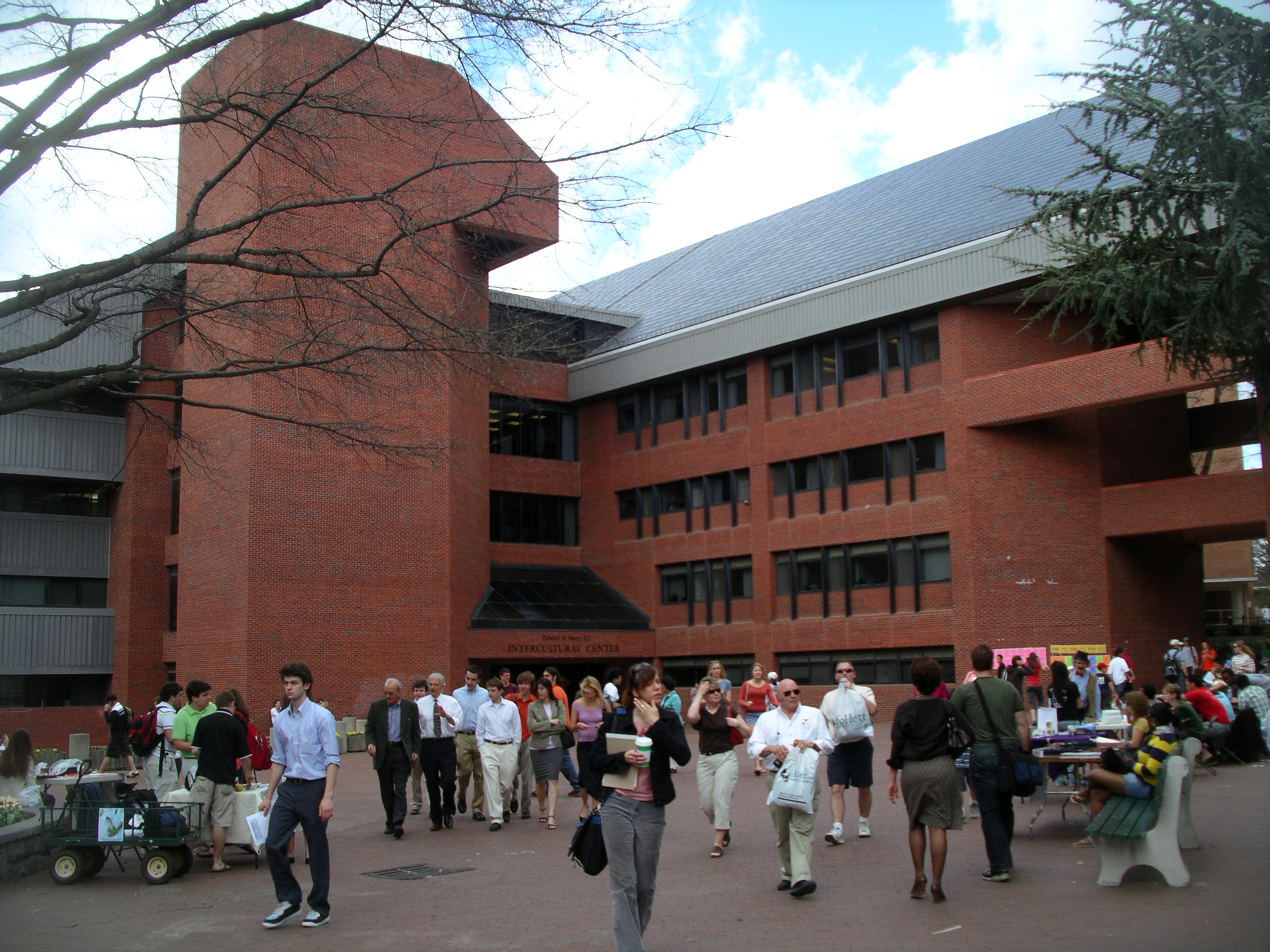
Students demonstrate and pass through Red Square, the center of student activism on Georgetown's campus.

Georgetown University student organizations include a diverse array of groups focused on social justice issues, including organizations run through both Student Affairs and the Center for Social Justice Research, Teaching, & Service (CSJ). The latter organization, founded in 2001, works to integrate into their education Georgetown's founding mission of education in service for justice and the common good.

Oriented against gender violence, Take Back the Night coordinates an annual rally and march to protest against rape and other forms of violence against women. Georgetown Solidarity Committee is a workers' rights organization whose successes include ending use of sweatshops in producing Georgetown-logoed apparel, and garnering pay raises for both university cleaning staff and police. Georgetown Students for Fair Trade successfully advocated for all coffee in campus cafeterias to be Fair Trade Certified.

Georgetown has many additional groups representing national, ethnic, and linguistic interests. Georgetown has the second-most politically active student body in the United States according to The Princeton Review. Groups based on local, national, and international issues are popular, and political speech is protected on campus. Student political organizations are active on campus and engage their many members in local and national politics. The Georgetown University College Republicans represent their party, while the Georgetown University College Democrats, the largest student organization on campus in 2008, represent theirs.

As a Catholic university, the pro-life organization Georgetown University Right to Life is officially recognized by the university. In 1981, Right to Life students helped found The Northwest Center, one of two crisis pregnancy centers in Washington. Every year, the organization sends a delegation to the March for Life to show support for the national pro-life movement. In addition, every January since 2000 the club has organized the Cardinal O'Connor Conference on Life. It is the largest student-organized pro-life conference in the United States.

The pro-abortion organization H*yas for Choice is not officially recognized by the university as its positions on abortion are in opposition to university policy, including supporting late-term abortion as is still legal in Washington, D.C., prompting the asterisk in "H*yas". While not financially supported by the school, the organization is permitted to meet and table in university spaces.

Georgetown is also home to a number of student organizations focused on sustainability and environmentalism. GREEN, the Georgetown Renewable Energy and Environmental Network, is the largest of these groups. Another student group, GU Fossil Free, was founded in 2013, and aimed to pressure the university to divest its endowment from fossil fuels. Georgetown is a member of the Ivy Plus Sustainability Consortium, through which it has committed to best-practice sharing and the ongoing exchange of campus sustainability solutions along with the other member institutions; it hosted the annual Ivy Plus summit in 2019. The university announced in February 2020 that it would fully divest its endowment from fossil fuels within the next five years.

=== Media ===
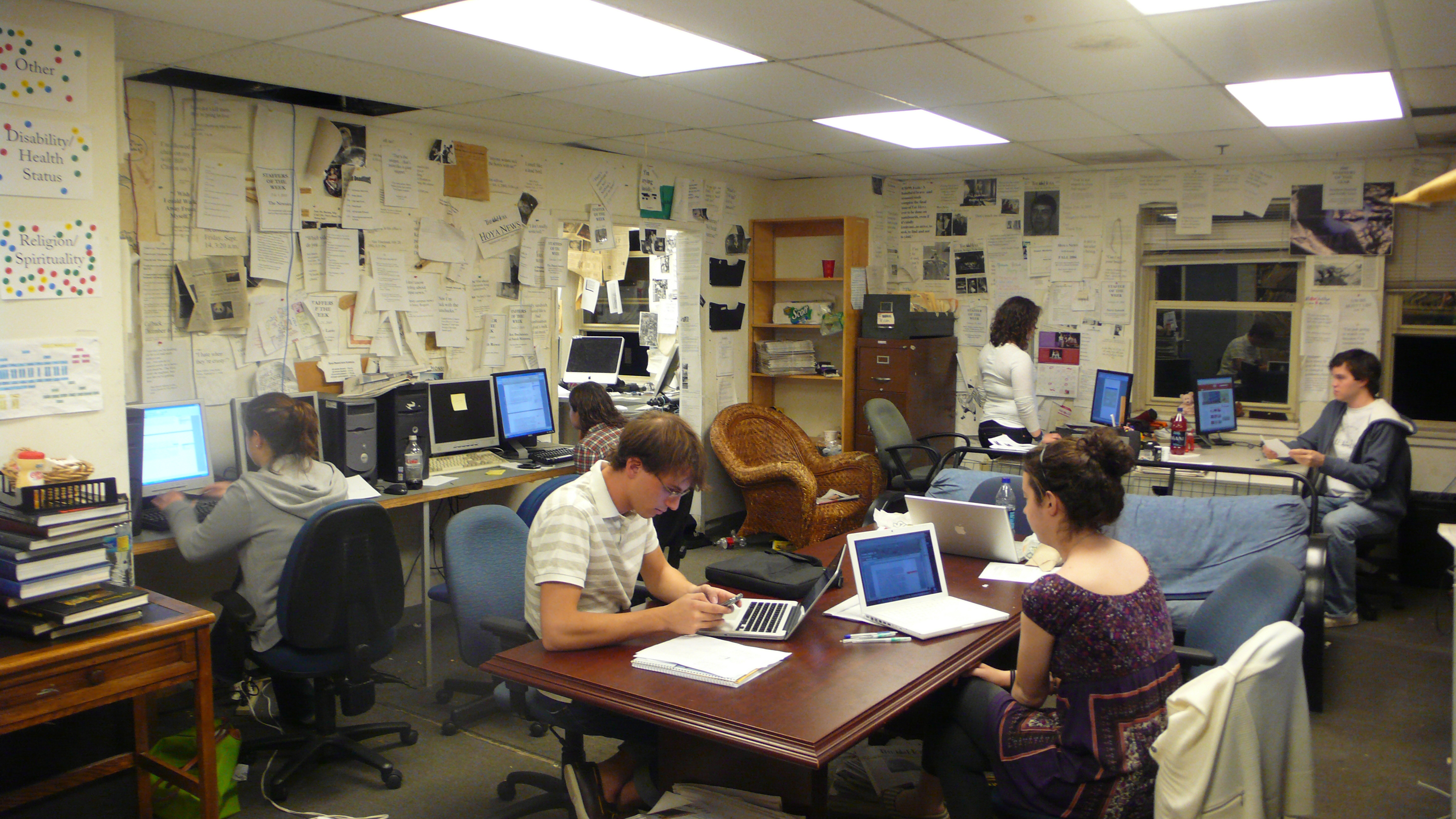
The Leavey Center office of The Hoya, the university student newspaper founded in 1920

Georgetown University has several student-run newspapers and academic journals. The Hoya is the university's oldest newspaper. It has been in print since 1920, and since 1987, has been published twice weekly. The Georgetown Voice, known for its weekly cover stories, is a newsmagazine that was founded in March 1969 to focus more attention on citywide and national issues. The Georgetown Independent is a monthly journal of news, commentary and the arts. Founded in 1966, the Georgetown Law Weekly is the student-run paper on the Law Center campus, and is a three-time winner of the American Bar Association's Best Newspaper award. Established in 1995, the Georgetown Public Policy Review is a student-run journal based out of the McCourt School of Public Policy that publishes online articles and a peer-reviewed spring edition. The Georgetown Journal of International Affairs, established in 2000, is a student-managed, peer-reviewed journal that publishes perspectives on current affairs and international relations from experts such as heads of states and renowned professors; it is the official journal of the School of Foreign Service and published by Johns Hopkins University Press.

The Georgetown Academy, restarted in 2008 after a hiatus, targets traditionalist Catholic readers, while the Georgetown Review, founded in 2016, aims to bring a conservative and libertarian viewpoint to campus. Other political publications include the Georgetown Progressive, an online publication run by the Georgetown University College Democrats, and Counterpoint Magazine, a liberal monthly founded in the spring of 2011. The Fire This Time is Georgetown's minority news source. The Georgetown Heckler is a humor magazine founded on the Internet in 2003 by Georgetown students, releasing its first print issue in 2007.

The university has a campus-wide television station, GUTV, which began broadcasting in 1999. The station hosts an annual student film festival in April for campus filmmakers. WGTB, Georgetown's radio station, is available as a webcast and on 92.3 FM in certain dormitories. The station was founded in 1946, and broadcast on 90.1 FM from 1960 to 1979, when university president Timothy S. Healy gave away the frequency and broadcast capabilities to the University of the District of Columbia because of WGTB's far left political orientation. The station now broadcasts through the Internet in its headquarters in the Leavey Center.

=== Greek life ===
Many Jesuit schools choose to disassociate from Greek systems, and Georgetown University officially recognizes and funds only one of the many Greek organizations on campus, Alpha Phi Omega, the national co-ed community service fraternity. Other Greek organizations exist on campus, although none require members to live in Greek housing. Additionally, Georgetown University students are affiliated, in some cases, with fraternities at other nearby universities and colleges.

About 10 percent of undergraduate students participate in Greek life, a ratio lower than at many other colleges and universities.

=== Traditions ===
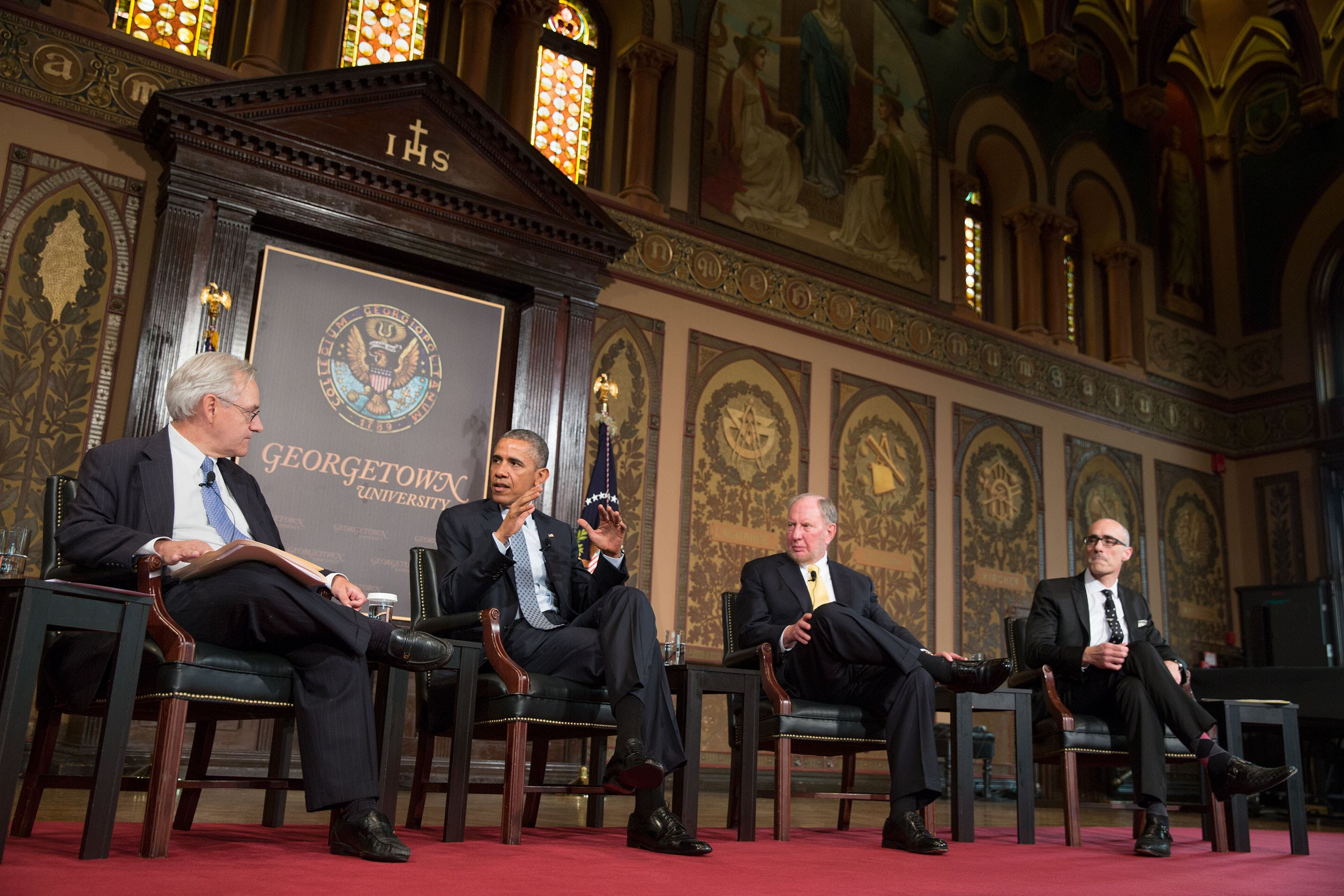
Gaston Hall, a venue for events, including this May 2015 speech by former U.S. President Barack Obama

Annual events on campus celebrate Georgetown traditions, culture, alumni, sports, and politics. In late April, Georgetown University celebrates Georgetown Day.

Homecoming coincides with a home football game, and festivities such as tailgating and a formal dance are sponsored by the Alumni Association to draw past graduates back to campus. The largest planned sports related celebration is the first basketball practice of the season. Dubbed Midnight Madness, this event introduces the men's and women's basketball teams shortly after midnight on the first day the teams are allowed by NCAA rules to formally practice together. The festivities include a dunk contest, a 3-point contest, a scrimmage, and a musical act.

== Athletics ==
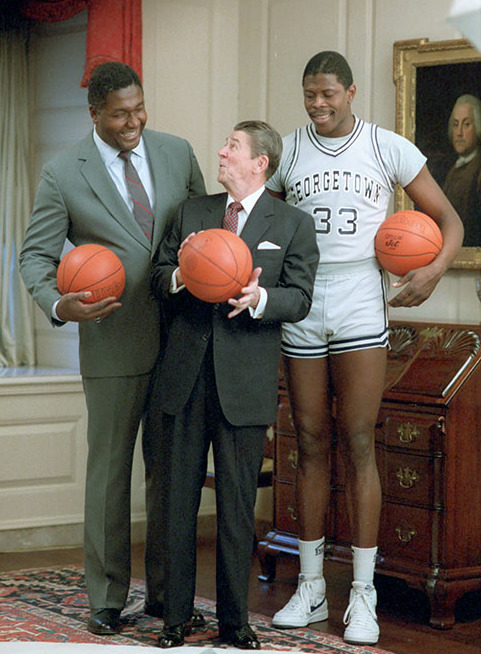
Georgetown basketball players, including Patrick Ewing, pictured in November 1984, have led the Hoyas to eight Big East Conference championships and one NCAA Championship.

Georgetown fields 23 varsity athletic teams and an additional 23 athletic club teams. The university's varsity teams participate in the NCAA's Division I. The school competes in the Big East Conference in most sports. Exceptions include the football team, which competes in Division I FCS' Patriot League, the sailing team, which competes in the Middle Atlantic Intercollegiate Sailing Association, and the rowing teams, which competes in the Eastern Association of Rowing Colleges.

In March 2002, U.S. News & World Report listed Georgetown's athletics program among the 20 best in the nation. Georgetown's student athletes have a 94% graduation success rate, and over 100 have gone on to play at some level of professional athletics.

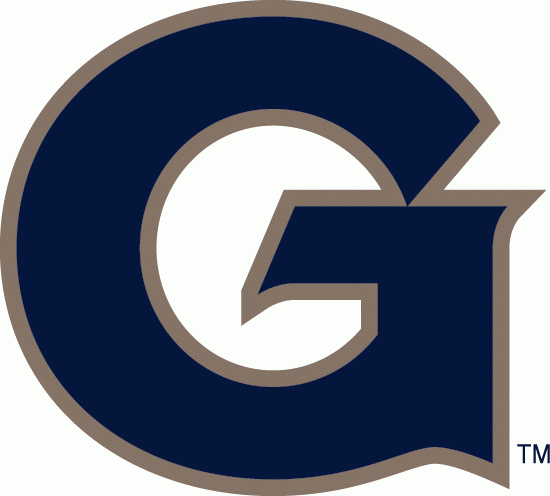
Hoya, Georgetown University's nickname

The school's teams are called "Hoyas", which originated sometime prior to 1893, when students invented the mixed Greek and Latin chant of "Hoya Saxa", translating roughly as "what (or such) rocks". The school's baseball team, then called the Stonewalls, began in 1870, and football began in 1874; the chant likely refers to one of these teams. By the 1920s, the term "Hoyas" was used to describe groups on campus, and by 1928, campus sports writers started using it instead of the older team name, the "Hilltoppers".

The men's basketball team, which won the NCAA championship in 1984 under coach John Thompson, is among the university's most successful athletic programs. The team holds the record for the most Big East conference tournament titles with eight, and has made thirty NCAA tournament appearances. Georgetown's NBA alumni are collectively among the highest earners from a single program.

The sailing team has won 14 national championships and one world championship in match racing since 2001. Over this time, the sailing team has graduated 79 All-Americans and six College Sailors of the year.

Georgetown has been nationally successful in both cross country and track and field. In 2011, the women's cross country team won Georgetown's second team NCAA championship.

The men's and women's lacrosse teams have both been ranked in the top ten nationally, as have both soccer teams, with the men winning Georgetown's third team national championship in 2019, and the women making the national quarterfinals in 2010 and the semifinals in 2016.

The rugby club team made it to the Division II Final Four in 2005 and 2009. In 2019, Georgetown won the women's team championship at the United States Intercollegiate Boxing Association national tournament held at Syracuse University.

Former Georgetown tennis coach Gordon "Gordie" Ernst, one of several people implicated in the 2019 college admissions bribery scandal, is alleged to have facilitated the admission to Georgetown of as many as 12 students through fraudulent means while accepting bribes of up to $950,000. Ernst had relocated to the University of Rhode Island, where he was placed on administrative leave after he was charged and arrested. He later pled guilty to conspiracy to commit federal programs bribery, three counts of federal programs bribery, and to filing false tax returns for failing to report many of the bribery payments.

== People ==
=== Employment and graduation outcomes ===
While about 73% of graduates enter the workforce immediately following graduation, many pursue advanced degrees in law, medicine, business, and other fields. Georgetown alumni pursuing graduate study have been recipients of 35 Rhodes Scholarships, 46 Marshall Scholarships, 33 Truman Scholarships, 15 Mitchell Scholarships, and 12 Gates Cambridge Scholarships. Georgetown is among the nation's top producers of Fulbright Scholars, with 565 over its history, and produced more than any other institution in 2020, 2021, 2023, and 2024. It was one of the top-ten yearly producers of Peace Corps volunteers as of 2016. Georgetown ranks among the top ten U.S. colleges for median graduate income, with graduates of the McDonough School of Business having the highest average starting salaries, at $100,859; Georgetown alumni in general have a median starting salary of $87,100 with a median mid-career salary of $179,300, as of 2023-2024.

Government and international relations are the two most popular undergraduate majors at Georgetown, and many students go on to careers in politics and diplomacy. Georgetown educated more U.S. diplomats than any other university as of 2015, including at least 92 alumni that have attained the rank of U.S. Ambassador. Twelve foreign heads of state and government have graduated from Georgetown. Georgetown alumni have served as foreign ministers in a dozen countries.

Finance and economics are the third and fourth-most popular undergraduate majors, and 40% of graduates start careers at consulting or financial services firms. The university is among the top ten alma maters reported by current Wall Street banking employees as of June 2020, according to LinkedIn surveys. Several graduates have gone on take research and leadership positions at monetary authorities and international financial institutions, including chair of the Federal Reserve and president of the World Bank.

=== Notable alumni and faculty ===
Former U.S. President Bill Clinton speaking at the 25 year reunion for the class of 1968

Bill Clinton, 42nd president of the United States, is a 1968 graduate of the School of Foreign Service. Former officials of the United States Cabinet include 59th Secretary of State and former Supreme Allied Commander Europe, Gen. Alexander Haig; 22nd Secretary of Defense and former CIA Director Robert Gates; 5th Secretary of Homeland Security and retired Marine Gen. John F. Kelly; and 76th Secretary of the Treasury Jack Lew. Other cabinet-level and senior executive branch officials include former Director of National Intelligence Avril Haines, former CIA Director George Tenet, 16th Chair of the Federal Reserve Jerome Powell, Director General of the Foreign Service Marcia Bernicat, and seven White House chiefs of staff who include Ron Klain, Denis McDonough, and John Podesta. Former President of the World Bank David Malpass and former CIA Director Gen. David Petraeus are both affiliated with the School of Foreign Service, where they completed academic fellowships. Notable non-graduate alumni include 36th President Lyndon B. Johnson and the 13th and 21st Secretary of Defense Donald Rumsfeld, each of whom studied law at the Georgetown University Law Center but left without a degree.

In addition to high ranking diplomatic posts, Georgetown alumni have participated in significant historical events of the 20th century. Alumnus and longtime faculty member Jan Karski was a World War II resistance fighter and courier for the Polish government-in-exile, where he was among the first to reveal the atrocities of the Holocaust to the world. Alumnus, Jesuit, career diplomat and founder of the School of Foreign Service Edmund A. Walsh also played a role in the investigations of the Nuremberg trials and Soviet war crimes.

In the 119th U.S. Congress, alumni Hakeem Jeffries, John Barrasso, and Dick Durbin hold party leadership positions, serving among a total of seven alumni in the United States Senate and 21 alumni and faculty in the House of Representatives. In total, 116 alumni have served in Congress and 26 have served as state governors, including Terry McAuliffe and Pat Quinn. On the U.S. Supreme Court, alumni include the late Associate Justice Antonin Scalia and former Chief Justice Edward Douglass White. Alumnus and former Solicitor General of the United States Paul Clement remains affiliated with the university as a member of the faculties of law and government.

The Hoya Battalion, the school's Army ROTC program, was ranked as the best in the country in 2012 for preparing cadets for military service, and its graduates, such as former Chief of Staff of the United States Army George W. Casey Jr., have gone on to serve at every rank, including four-star general. Georgetown alumni include at least 23 officers promoted to general or flag rank across the joint service, including Chairman of the Joint Chiefs of Staff Gen. Joseph Dunford and former NATO Supreme Allied Commander Gen. John J. Sheehan.

Twelve foreign heads of state and government have graduated from Georgetown, including King Felipe VI of Spain, King Abdullah II of Jordan presidents Alfonso López Michelsen and Iván Duque of Colombia, Galo Plaza of Ecuador, Ricardo Arias of Panama, Alfredo Cristiani of El Salvador, Laura Chinchilla of Costa Rica, Gloria Macapagal-Arroyo of the Philippines, Prime Minister of Lebanon Saad Hariri, Prime Minister of Portugal and President of the European Commission José Manuel Barroso, and member of the Presidency of Bosnia and Herzegovina Željko Komšić.

In business, Georgetown billionaire alumni include real estate developer and sports team owner Frank McCourt, sports entrepreneur Ted Leonsis, venture capital investor Chris Sacca, Ipsen heir Henri Beaufour, private equity investor Antonio Gracias, Swedish heir Marcus Wallenberg, founder of Kroll Inc. Jules Kroll, Hong Kong financier Eric Hotung, and MBNA founder Charles Cawley. Other prominent alumni in business include JPMorgan Chase executive Mary Callahan Erdoes, former Warner Bros. CEO Ann Sarnoff, investor Paul Pelosi and executives Laurence Tosi, Gary Perlin, David Wehner, Patricia Russo, and Charles Prince. Fortune 100 chair and CEO alumni include Josh D'Amaro of Disney, Jim Farley of Ford Motor and Greg Penner of Walmart.

Georgetown alumni in journalism have been awarded the Pulitzer Prize, Edward R. Murrow Award, and Peabody Awards for their reporting. Pulitzer Prize winners include Walter Pincus, John Bersia, and Megan Twohey. Joan Biskupic was a Pulitzer finalist for her coverage of the Supreme Court. Dan Henninger is the deputy editorial page editor of the Wall Street Journal, and Kathleen Kingsbury is the opinion editor of the New York Times. Both have degrees from the Walsh School of Foreign Service.

Alumni in the arts include Academy Award-winning screenwriter and novelist William Peter Blatty, whose novel The Exorcist and its film adaptation are set on the Georgetown campus, where the film was shot on location. Filmmaker Bradley Cooper has been nominated for 12 Academy Awards as a producer, writer, and actor. Screenwriter Jonathan Nolan is known for the films Interstellar and The Dark Knight, as well as the Academy Award-nominated Memento. Other Academy Award-nominated alumni include Golden Globe winner Andrew Morrison and writer-director RaMell Ross. Tony Award-winning alumni include John Guare and Jack Hofsiss.

== Bibliography ==
- Curran, Robert Emmett (1993). The Bicentennial History of Georgetown University: From Academy to University, 1789–1889. Vol. 1. Washington, D.C.: Georgetown University Press. ISBN 978-0-87840-485-8. Archived from the original on June 30, 2023 – via Google Books.
  - Curran, Robert Emmett (2010a). A History of Georgetown University: From Academy to University, 1789–1889. Vol. 1. Washington, D.C.: Georgetown University Press. ISBN 978-1-58901-688-0.
- Curran, Robert Emmett (2010b). A History of Georgetown University: The Quest for Excellence, 1889–1964. Vol. 2. Washington, D.C.: Georgetown University Press. ISBN 978-1-58901-689-7.
- Curran, Robert Emmett (2010c). A History of Georgetown University: The Rise to Prominence, 1964–1989. Vol. 3. Washington, D.C.: Georgetown University Press. ISBN 978-1-58901-690-3.
- Durkin, Joseph ed. Swift Potomac's Lovely Daughter. Two Centuries at Georgetown through Students' Eyes (Georgetown UP, 1990) 446 pp.
- Fiske, Edward B. (2010). Fiske Guide to Getting Into the Right College. Sourcebooks, Inc. p. 66. ISBN 978-1-4022-4309-7.
- McFadden, William C. ed. Georgetown at Two Hundred: Faculty Reflections on the University's Future (Georgetown UP, 1990), 353 pp.
- Nevils, William Coleman (1934). Miniatures of Georgetown: Tercentennial Causeries. Washington, D.C.: Georgetown University Press. OCLC 8224468.
- O'Neill, Paul R.; Williams, Paul K. (2003). Georgetown University. Charleston, South Carolina: Arcadia Publishing. ISBN 0-7385-1509-4.
