= Thomas Ramge =

German non-fiction writer

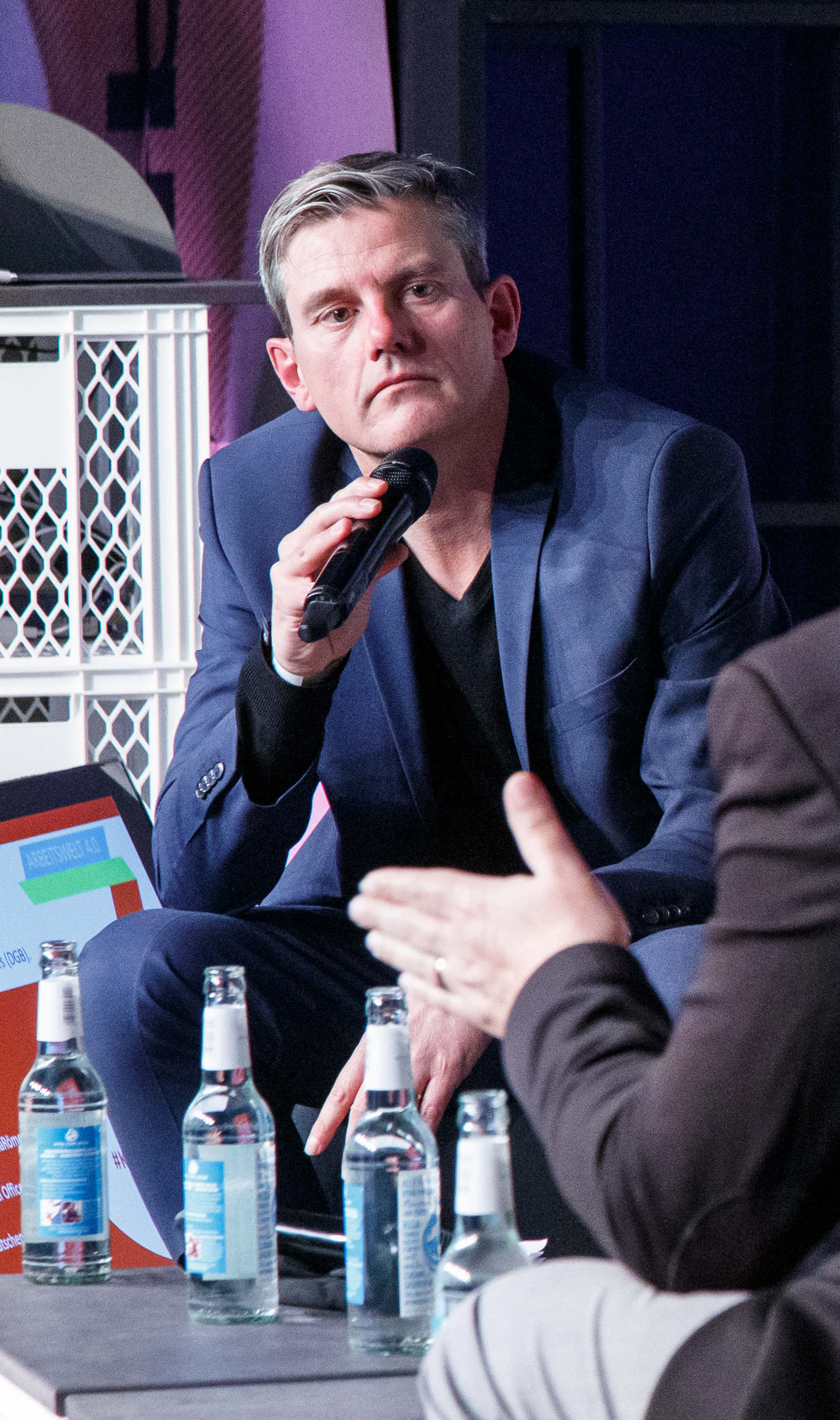
- Thomas Ramge in 2019
- Born: Giessen, Germany
- Education: Braunschweig University of Art
- Occupation: Author
- Website: thomasramge.de

Thomas Ramge is a German non-fiction author and researcher.

== Early life and education ==
Ramge was born in Giessen, Germany. He earned a PhD in sociology of technology on AI-assisted decision-making from Braunschweig University of Art.

Ramge holds a position as a fellow at the Einstein Center Digital Future in Berlin and has also served as a senior research fellow at the Weizenbaum Institute for the Networked Society.

== Career ==
Ramge began his career in broadcasting, where he served as a radio host and television reporter for ARD, a German public broadcasting network. He also worked as a political correspondent for Deutsche Welle TV.

In 2012, Ramge's book, In Data We Trust, was published which he co-authored with Björn Bloching and Lars Luck. The book was reviewed by David Reed in the Journal of Direct, Data and Digital Marketing Practice in 2013.

In 2018, Ramge co-authored a book titled Reinventing Capitalism in the Age of Big Data with Viktor Mayer-Schönberger. The book was reviewed by The New York Times, Fortune, Scripted, Finance & Development, and Kirkus Reviews. Kirkus Reviews described it as "An unnerving yet plausible portrait of a future in which finance capitalism will be as old-fashioned as Flower Power." Later, he also received the Getabstract International Book Award in 2018. In the same year, another book, The Global Economy as You've Never Seen It, was published. Rob Tench in a book review for Library Journal called it "Patrons of all levels, particularly students doing reports, could spend hours browsing this superb title." The book received the Axiom Business Book Award (Gold Medal Economics). In 2019, his book Who's Afraid of AI? was published.

In 2022, Ramge co-authored another book with Viktor Mayer-Schönberger titled Access Rules in which they discuss the data-hoarding practices of major tech companies and suggest alternative approaches for more equitable and open access to the information. The book was reviewed by Georgetown Public Policy Review and Engadget.

In 2023, On the Brink of Utopia was published which he co-authored with Rafael Laguna de la Vera. In the same year, Do you want to live forever? was published which was reviewed by Die Zeit and Frankfurter Allgemeine Zeitung.

Ramge is also a faculty member at AI Business School Zurich. He has also written articles for Harvard Business Review, MIT Sloan Management Review, and Foreign Affairs. He is also the host of the bi-weekly podcast of the Federal Agency for Disruptive Innovation SPRIND.

== Books ==
- Ramge, Thomas (2003). Die großen Politskandale (in German). Campus. ISBN 3-593-37069-7.
- Ramge, Thomas (2004). Die Flicks (in German). Campus. ISBN 9783593374048.
- Ramge, Thomas (2006). Nach der Ego-Gesellschaft (in German). Pendo. ISBN 3866120818.
- Friebe, Holm; Ramge, Thomas (2008). Marke Eigenbau (in German). Campus. ISBN 978-3-593-38675-1.
- Bloching, Björn; Luck, Lars; Ramge, Thomas (2012). In Data We Trust: How Customer Data Is Revolutionising Our Economy. A&C Black. ISBN 978-1-4081-7951-2.
- Etzold, Veit; Ramge, Thomas (2016). Equity Storytelling: Think – Tell – Sell: Boost Your Firm's Value with the Right Story. ISBN 978-1535571296.
- Ramge, Thomas; Schwochow, Jan (2018). The Global Economy as You've Never Seen It: 99 Ingenious Infographics That Put It All Together. The Experiment. ISBN 978-1615195176.
- Mayer-Schönberger, Viktor; Ramge, Thomas (2018). Reinventing Capitalism in the Age of Big Data. Basic Books. ISBN 9780465093687.
- Ramge, Thomas (2019). Who's Afraid of AI? Fear and Promise in the Age of Thinking Machines. The Experiment. ISBN 978-1615195503.
- Ramge, Thomas (2020). Postdigital: Using AI to Fight Coronavirus, Foster Wealth and Fuel Democracy. Murmann. ISBN 9783867746625.
- Mayer-Schönberger, Viktor; Ramge, Thomas (2022). Access Rules: Freeing Data from Big Tech for a Better Future. University of California Press. ISBN 978-0520387737.
- Ramge, Thomas (2023). Augmented Intelligence: Making Better Decisions with Data & AI. bf2 publishers. ISBN 979-8372705647.
- Ramge, Thomas; Laguna de la Vera, Rafael (2023). On the Brink of Utopia: Reinventing Innovation to Solve the World's Largest Problems. MIT Press. ISBN 978-0262546485.
- Ramge, Thomas (2025). Dimming the Sun: The Urgent Case for Geoengineering. The Experiment. ISBN 9798893030549.
- Ramge, Thomas (2025). The End of Ageing: How Biotechnology Is Redefining Human Life and What It Means for Us. Anthem Press. ISBN 978-1-83999-555-2.
