= Georgetown University School of Continuing Studies =

- Seal of Georgetown University
- Former names: Summer School (1953–1970); School for Summer and Continuing Education (1970–2004)
- Type: Private
- Established: 1970
- Parent institution: Georgetown University
- Affiliations: Roman Catholic (Jesuit)
- Dean: Kelly Otter
- Location: Washington, D.C., USA
- Campus: Urban
- Website: scs.georgetown.edu

The Georgetown University School of Continuing Studies (SCS) is a school at Georgetown University in Washington, D.C. SCS offers graduate programs in professional and liberal studies.

== Academics ==
=== Liberal Studies ===
The School of Continuing Studies offers degrees in Liberal Studies at the bachelor's, master's, and doctoral levels.

=== Master of Professional Studies (MPS) ===
SCS offers Master of Professional Studies degrees. As of 2026, programs include Global Sports Operations & Strategy, Liberal Studies, Applied Intelligence, Artificial Intelligence Management, Cybersecurity Risk Management, Design Management & Communications, Emergency & Disaster Management, Higher Education Administration, Human Resources Management, Information Technology Management, Integrated Marketing Communications, Journalism, Project Management, Strategic Communications, Real Estate, Sports Industry Management, Supply Chain Management, and Urban & Regional Planning.

=== Certificates, workshops, and custom education ===
SCS offers noncredit professional certificate programs and workshop courses.

More than 2,000 high school students each summer to participate in summer high school programs.

SCS also administers summer sessions for current undergraduate and graduate students. Courses are formatted as small, interactive classes.

== Administration ==
Kelly J. Otter, Ph.D., has served as dean of the School of Continuing Studies since 2014.

== List of deans ==
Deans and directors
No.	Name	Years	Notes	Ref.
Directors of the Summer School
1	James F. Dougherty SJ	1953–1954		
Deans of the Summer School
2	Paul Sullivan	1954–1963		
3	Rocco E. Porreco	1963–1967		
4	Jesse Mann	1967–1968		
5	Joseph Pettit	1969–1970		
Deans of the School for Summer and Continuing Education
-	Joseph Pettit	1970–1981		
6	Michael J. Collins	1981–2003		
7	Robert J. Thomas	2003–2004		
Deans of the School of Continuing Studies
-	Robert J. Thomas	2004–2005		
8	Robert L. Manuel	2006–2012		
9	Walter Rankin	2012–2014	Acting dean	
10	Kelly Otter	2014–present		

== Notable alumni ==
- Ian Conyers, American politician and businessman who represented the 4th District of Michigan in the Michigan Senate.
- Debbie Dingell, American politician serving as the U.S. representative from Michigan's 6th district.
- Wendell Felder, American politician who represents Ward 7 on the Council of the District of Columbia.
- Alyia Gaskins, American public health professional, urban palnner, and mayor of Alexandria, Virginia.
- Kirsten Kasper, professional triathlete who competed in the 2024 Paris Olympics.
- Norah O'Donnell, American television journalism and senior correspondent for CBS News.
- Walter Ratliff, Emmy Award-winning documentary director and reporter for the Associated Press.
- Mike Turner, American politician serving as a U.S. representative from Ohio's 10th congressional district.
