= Georgetown University School of Health =

School of georgetown university

- Seal of Georgetown University
- Type: Private
- Established: 2022
- Parent institution: Georgetown University
- Religious affiliation: Catholic (Jesuit)
- Dean: Christopher J. King
- Address: 3700 Reservoir Road, N.W., Washington, D.C. 38°54′42.6″N 77°4′24.8″W
- Campus: Urban - Georgetown
- Website: health.georgetown.edu

The Georgetown University School of Health is one of the eleven schools of Georgetown University. The school was founded in 2022, with the partitioning of the School of Nursing & Health Studies into the School of Nursing and the School of Health. The school comprises three academic departments: Global Health, Health Management and Policy, and Human Science.

The Department of Human Science created the Discovery Center in 2006, which includes a teaching laboratory, research laboratory, cell culture room, and a Zeiss Axiovert 2000 microscope.

== Academics ==
The School of Health offers degree-granting programs at the bachelor’s and master’s levels, as well as minors and other coursework.

In 2023, U.S. News & World Report ranked Georgetown University (School of Health) as the 32nd best health care management program in the United States, tied with 8 other universities. The Master of Science in Health Systems Administration program is accredited by the Commission on Accreditation of Healthcare Management Education (CAHME).

== List of deans ==
Deans of the School of Nursing & Health Studies
1	Bette Rusk Keltner Jacobs	2000–2010	
2	Julie DeLoia	2010–2011	Interim dean
3	Martin Iguchi	2011–2014	
4	Patricia Cloonan	2014–2019	Interim dean from 2014 to 2016
5	Carole Roan Gresenz	2019–2021	Interim dean
6	John T. Monahan	2021–2022	Interim dean
Deans of the School of Health
1	Christopher J. King	2022–present	Dean
