= Gary Perlin =

American financial executive

Gary Perlin was born in Chicago, Illinois. He is the former chief financial officer (CFO) of the Capital One Financial Corporation and former CFO of the World Bank.

== Background ==
Gary Laurence Perlin was educated at the Georgetown University School of Foreign Service with a degree in International Affairs, the London School of Economics with an M.Sc. in Economics, and received an MPA, Economics and Public Policy, from Princeton University's Woodrow Wilson School of Public and International Affairs in 1975. He lives in Virginia with his wife Amy, who is a rabbi. They have two sons, Jonah and Jacob.
