= Georgetown Public Policy Review =

- Discipline: Public policy
- Language: English

Publication details
- History: 1995 to present
- Publisher: McCourt School of Public Policy, Georgetown University (United States)
- Frequency: Irregular

Standard abbreviations
- ISO 4: Georget. Public Policy Rev.

Indexing
- ISSN: 1083-7523

Links
- Journal homepage

The Georgetown Public Policy Review (GPPR) is a nonpartisan, student-run, academic journal of the McCourt School of Public Policy at Georgetown University. Established in 1995, GPPR publishes articles and media content year-round, in addition to its feature editions. Starting in 2016, GPPR has published its peer-reviewed Spring Edition exclusively online. Previously, a print publication was published annually or biannually at the staff's discretion.

The organization's online and spring editions allow students, faculty, and guest writers to comment on pressing issues of the day. In 2014, GPPR began to produce podcasts to showcase its interviews and policy analysis in a new context.
