= Georgetown Journal of International Affairs =

- Discipline: International affairs
- Language: English

Publication details
- History: 2000–present
- Publisher: Johns Hopkins University Press on behalf of the Walsh School of Foreign Service (United States)
- Frequency: Annual

Standard abbreviations
- ISO 4: Georget. J. Int. Aff.

Indexing
- ISSN: 1526-0054
- LCCN: sn99008914
- JSTOR: 15260054
- OCLC no.: 863042378

Links
- Journal homepage; Online access; Online archive at Project MUSE

The Georgetown Journal of International Affairs is an annual peer-reviewed academic journal covering international affairs. It is published by the Johns Hopkins University Press on behalf of the Walsh School of Foreign Service. The journal publishes articles from a wide range of international and interdisciplinary perspectives. The journal was established in 2000 and is indexed in Columbia International Affairs Online, ProQuest databases, Hein Online, Thomson Gale, and the Public Affairs Information Service. The print edition is published annually.

== Organization ==
The organization has seven editorial sections (Conflict & Security, Global Governance, Human Rights & Development, Business & Economics, Science & Technology, Society & Culture, and Dialogues). The editors-in-chief of the online edition are Roman Messali and Sofia Wolinksi. The editors-in-chief of the print edition are Julio Wang Yuki Zhang. The organization also includes an Operations section, led by the Managing Editor, Kate Huntley, and a Development section, led by the Executive Director, Ewan Wilson.

== 37th & The World ==
37th & The World is the official podcast of the Georgetown Journal of International Affairs. The podcast dives into key global trends and speak directly with the experts working on these critical issues. Undergraduate and graduate student editors host conversations with scholars and practitioners on the subjects they find important and engaging.

== Notable alumni ==
- Ned Price, current Spokesperson for the U.S. Department of State and former Special Assistant to President Barack Obama.
- Parag Khanna, specialist in international relations and managing partner of FutureMap.
