= Georgetown Law Weekly =

American student newspaper (1966-)

Georgetown Law Weekly was a weekly newspaper published by students at Georgetown University Law Center in Washington, D.C., United States.

The Law Weekly had a circulation of 1,500 and was printed each Tuesday of the school year. In total, twenty-two issues were printed over the course of the Fall and Spring semesters. It was composed on Quark XPress 6.1 and is printed by Southern Maryland Publishing. The newspaper accepted letters to the editor via email that do not exceed 700 words. A version of the Law Weekly is available online.

The Law Weekly won the American Bar Association Law Student Division's best newspaper award three years in a row, from 2002 to 2004. The late Reverend Father Robert F. Drinan served as Faculty Adviser.

== Notable alumni ==
Greta Van Susteren (JD 1979), now a television news anchor on Fox News, wrote for the Law Weekly.

Mark Grabowski (JD 2007), now a syndicated columnist and internet law professor at Adelphi University, wrote for the Law Weekly.

== History of Georgetown law newspapers ==
The first newspaper at the Law Center was The Hoya, Law School Edition (1933–36). This was followed by Res Ipsa Loquitur, which started publishing in 1936. Res Ipsa Loquitur served as the student newspaper and alumni magazine until 1994, when it was replaced by the all-alumni publication Georgetown Law.

The Law Weekly began in 1966, and was originally part of the legal writing requirement program. Archives of these publications are available at the Edward Bennett Williams Law Library.
