= Robert Wild =

Robert Wild may refer to:

- Robert Wild (poet) (1615–1679), English clergyman and poet
- Robert A. Wild (born 1940), president of Marquette University
