= Joseph G. Marina =

American Jesuit

The Reverend Joseph G. Marina SJ

29th President of the University of Scranton
- Incumbent
- Assumed office June 14, 2021
- Preceded by: Scott Pilarz

Personal details
- Born: Phillipsburg, NJ, U.S.
- Education: St. John's University; Fordham University; Boston College

Orders
- Ordination: June 9, 2012

Joseph G. Marina SJ is an American Catholic priest and Jesuit who is currently the president of the University of Scranton.

== Early life ==
Marina was born in Phillipsburg, New Jersey. He studied at St. John's University, where he received a bachelor's degree in physics and a master's degree in secondary education. He then received a doctorate in administration and supervision from Fordham University. After entering the Society of Jesus, he received a Master of Divinity and Master of Theology from the Boston College School of Theology and Ministry.

Marina was ordained a priest on June 9, 2012, by Cardinal Edward Egan, the Archbishop Emeritus of New York, at the Fordham University Church.

In 2016, Marina became the provost and vice president for academic affairs at Le Moyne College, where he was also a professor of education. Prior to that, he was an associate provost, special assistant to the president, and the interim chairman of the education department.

== University of Scranton ==
Marina was elected by the university's board of trustees as the 29th president of the university on February 9, 2021, succeeding Jeffrey Gingerich, who became acting president upon the death of Scott Pilarz. Marina took office on June 14, 2021.
