= Joseph A. Panuska =

American university president (1927–2017)

Joseph Allan Panuska, S.J.

22nd President of the University of Scranton
- In office 1982–1998
- Preceded by: William J. Byron, S.J.
- Succeeded by: Joseph M. McShane, S.J.

Personal details
- Born: July 3, 1927 Baltimore, Maryland, U.S.
- Died: February 28, 2017 (aged 89) Philadelphia, Pennsylvania, U.S.
- Education: Baltimore Polytechnic Institute; Loyola University Maryland; Saint Louis University; Woodstock College
- Profession: Jesuit priest, academic

Rev. Joseph Allan Panuska, S.J. (July 3, 1927 – February 28, 2017) was an American priest of the Society of Jesus. Panuska served as the president of the University of Scranton from 1982 to 1998, as academic vice president and dean of faculties at Boston College from 1979 to 1982, as provincial of the seven-state Maryland Province of the Society of Jesus from 1973 to 1979, after serving as a biology professor and director of the Jesuit community at Georgetown University from 1963 to 1973.

== Early life and education ==
Joseph Allen Panuska was born on July 3, 1927, in Baltimore, Maryland. He is of Bohemian ancestry.

He attended the Baltimore Polytechnic Institute, a public high school of 2,300 students, and graduated in 1945 as the valedictorian of his class.

He received a bachelor of science degree in biology from Loyola College in 1948. In 1954 he was awarded a licentiate in philosophy and in 1958 he earned a doctorate in biology, both from St. Louis University. Panuska received a licentiate in sacred theology from Woodstock College in 1961. In 1974, Father Panuska was awarded an honorary doctor of laws degree from the University of Scranton.

== Career ==
=== Early career ===
In 1960, he was ordained as a Jesuit priest at Woodstock. He completed his Jesuit tertianship at Münster, Germany, in 1962. He then served as an instructor and NIH postdoctoral fellow in the Department of Physiology at Emory University School of Medicine in Atlanta, Georgia, from 1962 until 1963. After serving as an assistant professor of biology at Georgetown University from 1963 to 1966, he was promoted to the rank of associate professor in 1966 and finally to the rank of full professor in 1972 at Georgetown University. From 1969 to 1970, Panuska was on sabbatical as a visiting scientist and fellow at the Department of Pathology of Cambridge University. He then returned to Georgetown where he continued to serve as a professor of biology and also became the rector of the Jesuit community from 1970 until 1973. From 1970 until 1973, Panuska served as a trustee of the University of Scranton and as a member of the Academic Affairs Committee. Father Panuska held the post of Provincial of the Jesuit community of the seven-state Maryland Province from 1973 until 1979. He then served as the academic vice president, dean of faculties, and professor of biology at Boston College from 1979 to 1982. In this position, he was responsible for overall planning and financial decisions concerning the academic area of the college, comprising the admissions, university libraries, the College of Arts and Sciences, the Graduate School, and the Schools of Education, Law, Management, Nursing, and Social Work at the 14,000 student institution.

=== Time as president at the University of Scranton ===
In 1982, Father Panuska became the president of the University of Scranton, succeeding Father Byron. He served in this position until resigning in 1998. During his sixteen-year tenure as the president of the University of Scranton, Panuska led the university through a period of great growth and expansion, including physical improvements to the campus; a significant increase in the number of faculty members; and increasing the academic excellence and standing of the university. When he became president, the university had not built any new buildings for about fifteen years. Panuska led the university in a construction campaign, beginning with Redington Hall, a student residence, and culminating in the construction of 15 new buildings and renovation of existing facilities, at the cost of around 110 million dollars. In order to fund these ambitious and visionary building projects, he led the university through two successful fundraising campaigns, the Second Cornerstone and the Campaign for Scranton: Shaping the Future of a Jesuit University. The expansion of the physical plant was accompanied by an equally significant growth in the university's academic quality. During Pansuka's tenure as president of the University of Scranton, the student body expanded, its faculty increased, and more academic programs were put into place. Panuska also oversaw the creation of a new undergraduate school, the College of Health, Education, and Human Resources, which grew into a very successful component of the university. After Panuska's retirement, the university renamed this college in his honor as the Panuska College of Professional Studies. Admission standards and selectivity increased, allowing more rigorous academic programs. Additionally, the university began to draw more heavily from outside the area. While the emphasis had previously been on teaching alone, Panuska emphasized scholarly research with the faculty, feeling that this made teachers more inspiring from their grasp of the future. Finally, under him the university grew in stature and reputation, gaining national recognition for the first time and becoming more widely known in academic circles. Since 1983 the university has been ranked consistently as one of the top small universities of the Northeast and Middle Atlantic states. After his resignation, in recognition of his exceptional service to the university, the board of trustees conferred upon him the title of President Emeritus, making him the first former president to receive such an honor.

When news of Father Panuska's appointment was announced, he outlined his hopes and goals for the University of Scranton, stating that his ultimate goal was "an excellent educational environment which is filled with a faith that does justice to all." Noting the great contributions of former Presidents Father William Byron and Father Dexter Hanley, Panuska stated that he hoped to "make significant strides towards even greater academic quality and service." He stressed the importance of "working with the students, faculty, and staff at the university" as well as "relating to the city," an important part of the university community, in order to allow the university to live up to its full potential. Panuska wanted to help "the young people who come to us to learn, … achieve their best by supporting an educational situation and campus life that helps them be integrated in their life-value."

==== College of Health, Education, and Human Resources ====
In 1987, under Fr. Panuska, the university created a new college, named the College of Health, Education, and Human Resources which took four of its departments, Nursing, Physical Therapy, Education, and Human Resources, from the College of Arts and Sciences and combined them into a new academic college. Dr. Richard Passon, the university's former provost and academic vice-president, stated that "We determined that, because of their specialized nature, our programs in these fields should be organized within a separate division." Each of these fields involves the preparation of students for a professional field, requires internships or apprenticeships, is subject to frequent evaluation by various external agencies, and necessitates the licensing or certification of the student in order to allow them to practice the profession. Thus, the university decided that "administering these programs through a distinct academic unit [would] enhance [its] ability to respond to these needs."

At the time of the college's creation, nearly 15 percent of the university's undergraduate students majored in these programs. Additionally, "there is a growing interest among students in the health care and human resources fields, and in fact a revival of interest in education, ... a need for professionals in these fields," requiring the greater focus of a separate academic division.

While retaining the university's traditional emphasis on a broad, liberal arts education through required general education courses, the College of Health, Education, and Human Resources incorporated a service-learning component. Committed to the Ignatian mission of creating "women and men for others," the College of Health, Education, and Human Resources requires that students perform community service through coursework and projects as a requirement for graduation. In this way they come to understand the service aspects of their prospective careers in personal and comprehensible terms.

Since its founding, the College of Health, Education, and Human Resources, later renamed as the Panuska College of Professional Studies, has greatly expanded to include both graduate and undergraduate programs in the fields of Community Health Education, Counseling and Human Services, Education, Exercise Science and Sport, Health Administration, Human Resources, Nursing, Occupational Therapy, and Physical Therapy.

==== Campus improvements and new buildings ====
During Panuska's tenure as president of the University of Scranton, he oversaw a period of considerable improvement and construction on the physical plant of the campus. In addition to renovations to many existing structures, 15 new buildings were built on campus at a cost of over 110 million dollars paid for with the help of two large and highly successful capital campaigns, the Second Cornerstone and the Campaign for Scranton: Shaping the Future of a Jesuit University.

===== Microsurgery Lab =====
In 1983, the university constructed a microsurgery lab, a collaborative effort between Mercy Hospital and the university. Microsurgery, conducted underneath a microscope, permits surgeons to perform sensitive and delicate procedures which could not be done otherwise in areas such as ophthalmology, gynecology, urology, neurosurgery, cardiac and general vascular surgery, plastic surgery, and orthopedic surgery. The lab gives local surgeons the opportunity to develop their abilities to perform such procedures while also allowing students to conduct research and gain invaluable experience.

===== Rev. John J. Fitzpatrick, S.J. Field =====
In 1984, the university completed construction on its very first athletic field in the school's ninety-six history, which began in 1982 after the university acquired the land from the Scranton Redevelopment Authority. The land had previously been used as a rail yard for the Lackawanna and Wyoming Valley Railroad. The facility was designed as a multi-sports complex, complete with a regulation-size field for men's and women's soccer along with other sports and intramurals. It has bleachers seating 350, indoor facilities, and a parking lot. Panuska saw the field as fostering "the development of a total learning environment, an environment which supports a balanced life."

The university's board of trustees named the field in honor of Rev. John J. Fitzpatrick, S.J., a long-time booster of the university's athletic programs and dedicated member of the university community for twenty-two years. Fitzpatrick founded the club football team (which played between 1967 and 1978) and offered pre-game prayers at many of the Royals' sporting events. A dedication plaque on the field reads: "Because he is an exemplary priest, long dedicated to the students of the University, and especially to its student athletes, this first athletic field of the University of Scranton is lovingly dedicated to a living proof that 'Reaching for the rising sun is surely worth the cost.'"

In 1997, a re-dedication ceremony celebrated the installation of new artificial turf and improved lighting for the field. Fitzpatrick Field remains the university's primary outdoor athletic facility and is used for the Royal's varsity soccer, field hockey, and lacrosse teams. The field is also used for intramural flag football, ultimate frisbee, soccer, and field hockey.

===== Gonzaga House =====
In 1984, the University of Scranton acquired the Gonzaga House, located on Clay Avenue between Linden and Mulberry streets. Purchased for $100,000, it was the last house on the block of Clay Avenue that the university bought, after McGowan House, Blair House, and Luzerne House (demolished in 2010). It housed 15 female students, but in 1990 was converted a meeting place for students, faculty, and staff with an interest in education. Currently Gonzaga houses about thirteen upperclassmen. It is named for St. Aloysius Gonzaga, patron of youth. Entering the Jesuits in 1572, he died in 1591 while caring for victims of a plague.

===== Hill House =====
In 1984, the university acquired the Hill House at Linden and North Webster, the gift of an anonymous faculty member. It served as a faculty residence, guest house, and facility for meetings and social gatherings. It was demolished in 2007 and the sophomore dorm Condron Hall was built on the site.

Hill House was named in honor of Rev. William B. Hill, S.J. Rev. Hill spent one year teaching at the university as an associate professor of English in 1946 before returning in 1969 to serve as a professor of English. Rev. Hill served in a number of positions at the University of Scranton until his death in 2002. In addition to teaching English, he was the department chair from 1973 until 1975, the academic vice president from 1975 to 1978, special assistant to the president from 1987 until his death in 2002, the chaplain of the board of trustees, and the chaplain of the Pro Deo et Universitate Society. In 1984 on marking his fifteenth year of service to the university, it named the house in his honor.

===== William J. Byron, S.J. Recreation Complex =====
In 1985, the university began construction on its newest building, a new physical education and recreation complex. Completed in 1986, the William J. Byron, S.J. Recreation Complex is a three-level structure which connects to the Long Center, the facility for intercollegiate athletics. It contains three multi-use courts for basketball, volleyball, tennis, and one-wall handball as well as a one-tenth mile indoor running track, a six-lane Olympic-sized swimming pool complete with diving boards and an electronic scoreboard, four 4-wall racquetball courts, a gallery which overlooks the swimming pool and the racquetball courts, two aerobics/dance rooms, men's and women's locker rooms, saunas, and steam rooms. Panuska spoke about the importance of the new recreation complex, stating that it would help the university offer more "health-related activities" and to serve the recreational needs of the student body, including the intramural program. Panuska also noted that naming this facility for Fr. Byron, the president of the University of Scranton from 1975 until 1982, "provides us with a marvelous opportunity to thank him for his leadership at the University and in the region."

===== Francis E. and Elizabeth B. Redington Hall =====
Finished in 1985, Redington Hall is a residence for 244 students and for Jesuit-faculty counselors. Every two rooms share a bathroom although each room contains its own sink. In addition to dorm rooms, the building also contains numerous study and lounge areas and Collegiate Hall, a large conference room for study, assembly, and ceremonial functions, which was modeled after an early Christian basilica, with a clerestory and side aisles, culminating in a four-hundred-square-foot window. The clerestory walls are inscribed in both Latin and English with the founding date of the university and lyrics from the alma mater. The buildings of Redington Hall form a "U" that is open to the south to take advantage of the year-round sunshine and look out on South Scranton. The west wing contains Collegiate Hall, angled to face the Commons. At the northwest corner of the residence hall, there is a three-storied entry rotunda containing the stairs, lounges, circulation space, a clock tower with a carillon, and a glass-pyramid roof and crucifix designed by Rev. Panuska. The carillon system was produced by the Maas-Rowe Co. of Escondido, California. The five largest bells in the bell tower were cast in Loughborough, England, by John Taylor and Company and range in diameter from 18 to 30 inches and in weight from 147 to 560 pounds. Each is inscribed: one features a quotation from the Ignatian Spiritual Exercises, another marks the 1888 establishment of the university and cites the university motto (Religio - Mores - Cultura), and three others display the text of the second verse of the university's alma mater. The crucifix features a geometric corpus with head bowed, symbolizing the moment of death and illustrating the cost of the love Christ chose to endure.

Father Panuska asserted that Redington Hall "represents a significant improvement to the living and working environment of [the] campus," in addition to "provid[ing] adequate housing for [the] residential students." The facility is named for Francis E. Redington and his wife, Elizabeth Brennan Redington. It houses 242 sophomore students.

===== Rev. Joseph A. Rock, S.J. Hall =====
On December 15, 1983, the University of Scranton purchased the Assembly of God Church from the Reformed Episcopalian congregation who could no longer properly maintain the facility as the costs and utilities were too high. It was renamed Rock Hall to honor the late Rev. Joseph A. Rock, S.J., a well-known and respected educator at the University of Scranton. The university's President Panuska noted that "the growth of the university, both in terms of the beauty of its campus and the achievements of its students, was in no small measure due to the efforts of Father Rock, ... [as] his contributions to the university as a teacher, administrator, counselor, and friend were exceptional." Originally, the university intended to use the first floor of the facility for administrative offices which had previously occupied space in St. Thomas and Jefferson Halls, including the Department of Central Services, the Maintenance Department, and the Security Department, while the assembly area was to accommodate smaller social and cultural affairs – including lectures, dinners, dances – to relieve the over-scheduled Jefferson and Eagen Auditoriums. During the renovations of Rock Hall, however, the need for a new chapel was identified, as the St. Ignatius chapel in St. Thomas Hall did not provide adequate seating and contained structural limitations which were not conducive to acoustics or the aesthetics of the liturgies. The Chapel is named Madonna della Strada ("Our Lady of the Way") in reference to an image of the Virgin Mary enshrined in the Church of the Gesu in Rome and serves as the primary site for the university's major liturgical services, including the regular Sunday masses. Panuska commented that the chapel "provides the university and the surrounding community with a beautiful setting for liturgical celebrations." The chapel was consecrated on February 15, 1985, by Bishop James C. Timlin, D.D. The first floor of Rock Hall became the home of the university's Military Science department and ROTC program.

During the 1980s the university also acquired two other churches. In 1986, it acquired the Immanuel Baptist Church at the corner of Jefferson and Mulberry, which houses the university's Performance Music Programs. In 1987 it acquired the former John Raymond Memorial Church at Madison and Vine, which serves as the Smurfit Arts Center with studio space for the Fine Arts department. The university's efforts were cited in a 1988 edition of Inspired, a bi-monthly publication devoted to the preservation of historic religious buildings.

===== Hopkins House =====
In 1985, the University of Scranton acquired the Hopkins House, located at 1119 Linden Street. It originally served as the home for the university's student publication offices, which included the Aquinas student newspaper, the Windhover yearbook, and the literary magazine Esprit. The House was named in honor of Gerard Manley Hopkins, the “greatest poet in the Jesuit order” and “the first modern poet throughout the world, with the hope that those working for the Scranton student publications would look to him as a role model and a source of inspiration for their work. Fr. J.J. Quinn stated that “for collegiate journalists and writers, Hopkins inspires them to use language not only to communicate a story or a poem, but to see God in all things and all things in God.”

In 1988, because of a shortage of available on-campus beds, the university converted Hopkins House into a student residence. The housing crunch resulted from the city's crackdown on illegal rooming houses, as well as concerns about security and the conditions of off-campus houses, which all led to an increasing demand for on-campus housing. In 1990, the university converted the Hopkins House into the Service House, a themed house meant to bring together students, faculty, and staff with an interest in community service “to act as a catalyst to expand the university’s already considerable involvement in volunteer work” through getting as many people involved as possible and coordinating the volunteer activities of the other student residences.

Before it was acquired by the university, Hopkins House was the home of Terry Connors, the university photographer for over four decades.

In 2007, Hopkins House was demolished in order to make room for the construction of Condron Hall, a sophomore residence hall.

===== Houlihan-McLean Center =====
In 1986, the University of Scranton acquired the former Immanuel Baptist Church at the corner of Jefferson Avenue and Mulberry Street in order to house the school's Performance Music Program, which includes the university's orchestra, bands, and singers, as well as to serve as a site for musical and other arts performances, lectures, and special liturgies. The church was built in 1909 in the Victorian Gothic style. In 1984 it was vacated when the congregation merged with the Bethany and Green Ridge Baptist, and was acquired by the university. After its purchase the building underwent extensive renovations and restoration, including plaster repair and floor refinishing, painting and carpeting, extension of the stage, electrical re-wiring, new lighting, a new sound system, refurbishing the organ, pressure cleaning and restoration of the building's masonry, and the installation of a new roof.

The main floor of the building houses the Aula, a concert hall which can seat approximately 650 people; the Atrium, a large space which can be used as a recital, reception, or lecture hall that can seat 400 people and formerly served as the church's Sunday School; the Wycliffe A. Gordon Guest Artist Hospitality Suite; and the sound control room. The ground floor of the building includes a large rehearsal hall, small ensembles areas, a musicians' lounge, practice rooms, offices, music library, and secure instrument storage and repair areas. The Nelhybel Collection Research Room is on the top floor, along with the organ loft and organ chamber. Houlihan-McLean features an historic 1910 Austin Opus 301 symphonic pipe organ, one of only a few surviving examples of early 20th-century organ building. The 3,157 pipes, some as large as 17 feet long and weighing 200 pounds while others are smaller than a pencil, were transported to Stowe, Pennsylvania, to be cleaned and repaired by specialists at Patrick J. Murphy & Associates, Inc. On January 30, 2005, President Panuska celebrated the restoration by blessing the organ which was then heard for the first time in decades, as concert organist Thomas Murray performed selections by Vivaldi, Schumann, Grieg, Mendelssohn, and Elgar.

The Houlihan-McLean Center also has a bell tower which holds a large bell, forged in 1883 by the Buckeye Bell Foundry and Van Duzen and Tift, Cincinnati, Ohio, and installed by the Immanuel Baptist congregation when the Church moved into the current Houlihan-McLean Center from its former location. The bell's inscription reads, "Presented by the Choir in Memory of Mrs. C. F. Whittemore, Who Died July 7, 1883." In 1991, the university installed an electronic bell ringer, programmed to ring the bell every hour, using a motor and hammer manufactured in England.

The building is named for Atty. Daniel J. Houlihan and Prof. John P. McLean, two dedicated, longtime faculty members at the university. A former student of theirs was the benefactor whose contribution, made in their honor, enabled the university to acquire the structure in 1986.

The Houlihan-McLean Center continues to serve as the home for the Performance Music Programs at the university.

===== Kathryn and Bernard Hyland Hall =====
Completed in 1987, Kathryn and Bernard Hyland Hall is a four-story facility with 16 classrooms and a 180-seat tiered lecture hall, in addition to a cafe and lounge. Hyland housed the bookstore until it was moved to the DeNaples Center in 2008. The site of Hyland Hall was previously occupied by Lackawanna College, prior to its move to 901 Prospect Avenue. Since 2001, Hyland has also been home to the university's art gallery, which had been located in The Gallery, demolished in 2001. Hyland's exhibit space is roughly double the size of the old gallery, with a wall of windows, a cathedral ceiling, and moveable walls to enhance the ambiance of the environment, as well as an adjoining workshop and classroom space for lectures and workshops. In 2004, the art gallery was named in honor of Hope Horn, a vibrant force in the arts community of Scranton and prolific painter and sculptor; she'd bequeathed her estate to the University of Scranton to support art and music education.

===== Harper-McGinnis Wing in St. Thomas Hall =====
In 1987, the university completed construction on the Harper-McGinnis Wing, a two-floor, 14,000 square foot structure connected to St. Thomas Hall which houses offices for the Physics and Electronic Engineering Department's faculty as well as numerous laboratories including a modern and atomic physics lab, an electricity and magnetism lab, a very large system integration lab, and a computer-assisted-design lab. At the time of its completion, the advanced technological features located in the Harper-McGinnis Wing allowed the university and its professors to be on the cutting edge of modern technological research. The wing was named in honor of Dr. Eugene A. McGinnis, a long-time physics professor at the university, and Dr. Joseph Harper, the chairman of the physics department.

===== Loyola Hall of Science =====
As part of the "Second Cornerstone" campaign, a fifteen million dollar expansion and improvement project, the university extensively renovated Loyola Hall in 1987. Loyola Hall was constructed in 1956, as part of a major campus expansion. Built at a cost of $1,205,000, the reinforced concrete structure featured a porcelain enameled steel "skin" brickwork as well as aluminum mullions along its exterior. At the time of its opening, the ground floor was dedicated to engineering, the first floor to physics, the second floor to biology, and the third floor to chemistry. The penthouse accommodated the university's radio station (WUSV) and its equipment, including a steel radio tower, later dismantled in 1974. When the building was first constructed, its ultra modern design, technologically advanced features, and ability to house all of the science departments in one building made it a vital part of the University of Scranton campus. Before the construction of Loyola Hall, engineering students had to go elsewhere for the final two years of their education because the university lacked the proper equipment to teach them.

In the 1987, $2,750,000 expansion of Loyola Hall, the existing building was remodeled and an expansion towards Monroe Avenue was added, in order to accommodate the growing student body and the expanding science programs. An additional floor and a twenty-foot extension of Loyola's east wall expanded the floor space of the facility by more than 14,000 square feet. The new space provided room for additional chemistry laboratories, classrooms, research areas, and computer facilities for faculty and students.

With the construction of the Loyola Science Center in 2011, Loyola Hall was functionally superseded. The science departments, classrooms, and laboratories formerly housed in Loyola Hall were moved to the more modern, technologically advanced, energy-efficient, and safer Loyola Science Center. According to James Devers, Assistant Vice President for Facilities Operations, "the overall end result for Old Loyola as part of the master plan is to demolish the building and open up the space in front of the Estate to what it would have looked like in 1871." However, Loyola Hall has not yet been demolished, as it serves as "swing space," or a housing site for classes or offices whose buildings are undergoing renovations. Most recently, the building provided housing for the Panuska College of Professional Studies Academic Advising Center and the departments of Physical Therapy and Occupational Therapy, all displaced by the demolition of Leahy Hall and the construction of the new Center for Rehabilitation Education.

===== Center for Eastern Christian Studies =====
The Center for Eastern Christian Studies was built as an ecumenical and academic institute designed to promote knowledge about and understanding of the religious and cultural traditions of Eastern Christianity. In addition to the Byzantine Rite chapel in the building, the Center was designed to house a 15,000-volume library, office, social area, and a cloister garden. Construction was begun in 1987 and completed later that year.

The Center for Eastern Christian Studies was renamed Ciszek Hall in 2005 in the memory of Fr. Walter Ciszek, S.J., a native of northeastern Pennsylvania and a candidate for sainthood who spent twenty-three years ministering in Soviet prisons and the labor camps of Siberia. Currently, Cisek Hall houses the university's Office of Career Services, a chapel which celebrates service in the Byzantine Rite, and a library containing 15,000 books.

===== St. Edmund Campion, S.J. Hall =====
Campion Hall, opened in 1987, is the university's residence building for the Jesuit community. It is named in honor of Saint Edmund Campion, S.J., a 16th-century Jesuit pastor and scholar who was martyred in England during the persecutions of Roman Catholics for defending his faith, and it provides living and working accommodations for thirty Jesuits. The two-story building also has an interior garden, an office, kitchen and dining facilities, and a chapel in addition to a flexible design with four discrete sections, such that the building could adapt to the changing needs of the Jesuit Community at the university. Before the construction of Campion Hall, the primary residence for the Jesuits at Scranton was the Estate, the former Scranton family residence given to the university by the family in 1941. It provided living accommodations for seventeen of the university's thirty-six Jesuits in the 1980s. The building of Campion Hall, estimated at $1.7 million, was financed entirely by the university's Jesuit community. Jesuits working at Scranton Preparatory School also live in the residence.

===== Michael W. J. Smurfit Arts Center =====
In January 1987, the University of Scranton under Panuska purchased the former John Raymond Memorial Church, Universalist, at Madison and Vine for $125,000. This was one of the three church buildings acquired by the university in the 1980s (supra). Built in 1906, the Romanesque building contains one of the tallest bell towers in Scranton. The main floor of the small but remarkably designed structure, which contains 7,200 square feet of floor space, is used as a studio-art facility for the Fine Arts program. The basement is used for the department's offices and classrooms. During the renovations of the building, the university had to remove the stained glass windows and replace them with clear glass to provide the area with natural lighting. The two stained glass windows from the Smurfit Arts Center, which were crafted by the Tiffany Glass Company, were moved to be displayed in Hyland Hall. The Smurfit Arts Center was named for Michael W. J. Smurfit H'85, a generous Irish benefactor whose two sons, Anthony and Michael, attended the University of Scranton. Smurfit was the chairman and chief executive officer of Jefferson Smurfit Group, Ltd., a multinational corporation with headquarters in Dublin, Ireland, Alton, Illinois, and New York City.

===== John R. Gavigan Residence Hall =====
In 1988, the university under Panuska began construction on a new, four-story residence hall as "part of [the university’s] continuing effort to provide high-quality on-campus student housing." Housing 236 students, the facility accommodates four students in each suite, and features lounges on each floor, study rooms, and a kitchen as well as a study area for its residents on the top floor which features two-story-high glass windows with views of the campus and of the city. The building, named the Gavigan Residence Hall, is dedicated to John R. Gavigan to honor his thirty-eight years of service to the university and his devotion to the institution's students. The university has used Gavigan Hall to house sophomore students.

===== Gannon Hall, Lavis Hall, and McCormick Hall =====
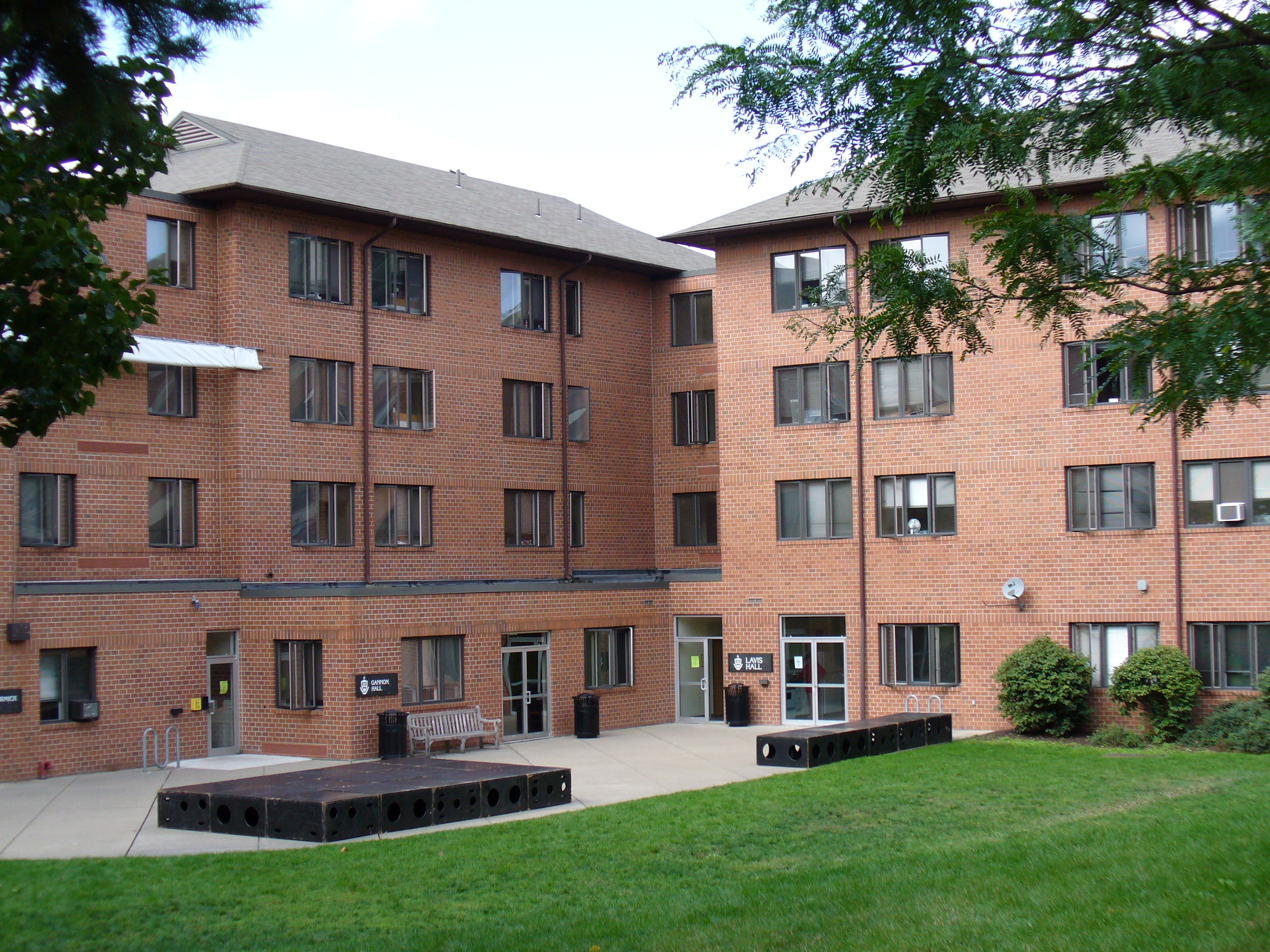
Lavis Hall, Gannon Hall, McCormick Hall and the Freshman Patio set up for an event later that evening.

Gannon Hall, Lavis Hall, and McCormick Hall, referred to as "GLM," comprise a 47,500 square foot, 220-bed student residential complex for first-year females. Each four-story residence hall features a large lounge on the first floor and smaller lounges on the upper three floors as well as a kitchen on the first floor of each building. The three buildings are connected on each floor by an enclosed walkway. The dorm rooms are the traditional, with communal bathrooms on each floor and two people per room. The complex was constructed in 1990–91 at a cost of approximately $3.7 million in response to the shrinking local student population and increased number of boarders. The university developed Nevils Beach, an open, recreational space, into the new dorm complex.

Gannon Hall was named for Rev. Edward J. Gannon, S.J., a member of the philosophy department for 22 years before his death in 1986. Gannon founded the Special Jesuit Liberal Arts Program and served as the editor of Best Sellers magazine and moderator the Alpha Sigma Nu honor society. In 1980, he became the first faculty member to hold the title "University Professor," which allowed him to teach in any department. Panuska noted that Father Gannon "had a profound effect on countless students and anyone else who knew him," as he "taught, counseled, and cajoled – using all of his energy to help others take full advantage of their God-given talents," truly living out the Jesuit ideal of turning potential into achievement.

Lavis Hall was named for the late Robert G. Lavis, a lifelong resident of Scranton who established two scholarship funds at the university: the Robert G. Lavis Scholarship, a four-year, full-tuition scholarship to assist deserving students, and the Joseph F. Lavis Award named for his father, which provides financial assistance to continuing students whose needs cannot be met through other sources. Lavis hoped that his scholarships would provide students with the opportunity to concentrate on their studies and not be overburdened with outside work.

McCormick Hall was named for Rev. James Carroll McCormick, the Bishop of Scranton from 1966 to 1983. In October 1990, the university's board of trustees voted to name the building after him, as Rev. Panuska put it, "out of respect for his many years of spiritual leadership in our Diocese, and in gratitude for the Diocese's and his personal friendship and support of the University." Bishop McCormick was present and gave a blessing at the dedication of the Gannon-Lavis-McCormick complex.

"GLM" houses around 210 female freshmen.

===== Royal Way =====
The University Commons, the main walkway through the University of Scranton's campus, runs through the former 900 and 1000 blocks of Linden Street. After twenty five years of agitation on the part of the university, the improvement project was actualized in 1980 in order to create a more attractive, park-like atmosphere on the campus and to eliminate the safety hazards associated with pedestrian and vehicle traffic. The twenty-foot wide brick walkway, lined by trees, benches, and landscaping, runs through the center of campus. In 1991, under Father Panuska, the University Commons was extended on the 300 block of Quincy between Linden and Mulberry, which had been closed to vehicular traffic and owned by the university since 1987. This pedestrian pathway, named Royal Way, serves as an official entrance to the university and the GLM (Gannon-Lavis-McCormick) student residences.

At the time of its construction, the 24-foot-wide Royal Way was paved in z-brick and featured landscaping with trees and shrubs. The Mulberry Street entrance to the Royal Way featured a campus gate, a gift from the University of Scranton Classes of 1985, 1990, and 1991, and the opposing terminus was Metanoia, the bronze sculpture of St. Ignatius of Loyola by Gerard Baut. The sculpture has since been moved to the opposite side of the University Commons, in front of the Long Center.

===== Harry and Jeanette Weinberg Memorial Library =====
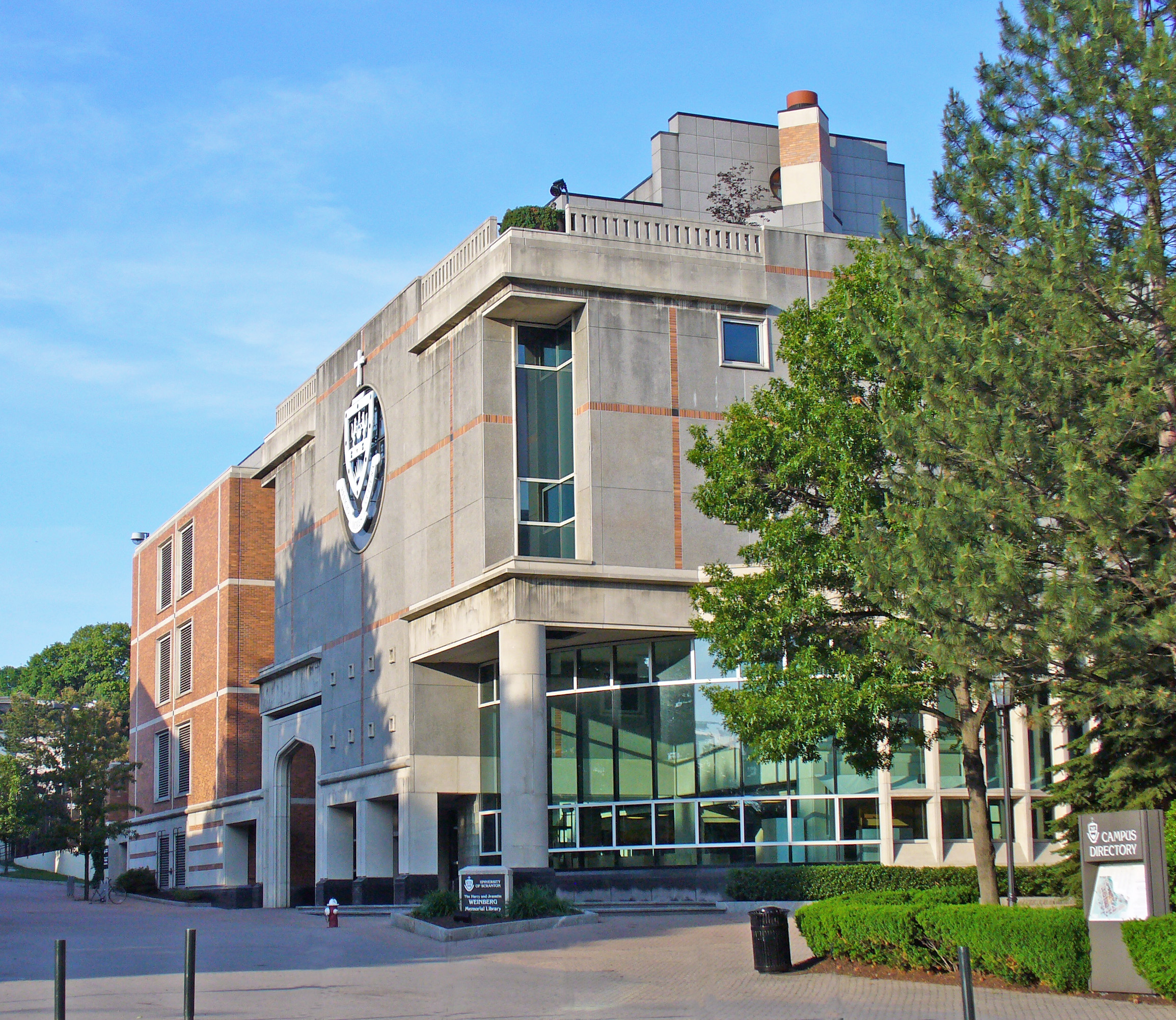
The Harry and Jeanette Weinberg Memorial Library

Completed in 1992, the Harry and Jeanette Weinberg Memorial Library was designed to replace the Alumni Memorial Library, which proved unable to serve adequately the growing student population, to house the vast library collections, and lacked the necessary wiring for modern technologies. More than double the size of the Alumni Memorial Library, Weinberg has five floors which can seating up to 1000 users at cubicles, tables, group study rooms, and lounges. It also holds the library's collections numbering over 330,000 volumes. On the third floor, there are a number of administrative offices as well as two large classrooms which are used for classes on learning about the library and its services. The fourth floor has a large reading room with a stained glass window and comfortable, quiet environment, with tables and couches. The fifth floor is the Scranton Heritage Room which is a large open hall featuring views of the city, the surrounding mountains, and the Commons, as well as thirty-nine panel paintings by Trevor Southey depicting art, religion, and science in the Lackawanna Valley and worldwide. Throughout the year, the Heritage Room hosts various exhibits including displays of artifacts and documents from the university's archives and special collections, showcases of faculty scholarship and university alumni authors, and the library's Environmental Art Show. It also serves as the venue for many campus and community events such as lectures, receptions, student award presentations, Game Night, and the library's annual Book Sale.

Since its completion, the library has continued to adapt to student needs and incorporate new technological innovations. Renovations at the library include the opening of multiple 24-hour study rooms, including the Pro Deo Room, the Reilly Learning Commons, and the entire second floor. The Pro Deo Room contains a computer lab with networked PCs, two laser printers, a vending machine area, and a Java City café, as well as a 46-inch touchscreen table PC. The Pro Deo Room is open 24 hours a day, seven days a week. In order to accommodate the growing needs of students for more 24-hour study space in the library, the library built a new space in 2010 which contained more than one hundred study spaces for students at cubicles, tables, and couches. This study space was renovated in 2014. Renamed the Reilly Learning Commons, the study room is now an interactive space with high end technology, group study rooms, and areas designed to enhance collaboration. The Learning Commons houses a lecture capture room to practice presentations and record them digitally, two writing center offices, technology support, and iMacs. In Fall 2015, in response to student feedback, the entire second floor of the library was opened for 24-hour use, allowing for more access to carrels, computers, and space for quiet study.

In order to raise the $13.3 million needed to build the Library, the University of Scranton launched the "Gateway to the Future" Fundraising Campaign. During his speech at the Gateway to the Future Library Kickoff, Panuska underscored the importance of building a library which could adequately serve the needs of the university community, stating:

A library is the essential non-human instrument which contributes to our meaning. It touches the arts as well as business and science. It focuses both faculty and students on the intellectual aspect of University life, where the focus must be. It keeps us in touch with the knowledge of the past and with what is happening today, therefore allowing us intelligently to form the future. It is a center for the transmission of knowledge, today involving the most advanced electronic technology.

In late 1989, Harry Weinberg, a former Scranton businessman and long-time benefactor of the University of Scranton, made significant headway in the fundraising goal by announcing a six-million-dollar donation to the university, with five million dollars going to the library and the other one million going to the school's Judaic Studies Institute. In order to honor the significant contribution of Mr. Weinberg, the new library was named for him and his wife.

Before becoming home to the Weinberg Memorial Library, the site was the home of Worthington Scranton until he moved to the Estate in 1899, at which point the house was converted into the Hahneman Hospital, relocated in 1906 to the current Community Medical Center site. In 1941, Scranton donated the land to the university. In the 1950s the site held the A Building barracks, which was purchased by the university to accommodate increased enrollment due to the GI Bill and used as classrooms and offices, until demolished in 1962. Until the construction of the Weinberg Memorial Library in the 1990s, the site housed asphalt playing courts.

===== Joseph M. McDade Center for Literary and Performing Arts =====
The McDade Center for Literary and Performing Arts was constructed in 1992 on the former site of the Lackawanna County Juvenile Center. Home to the university's English & Theatre department's classrooms, offices, labs, meeting spaces, and a black box studio theatre, the McDade Center also houses the 300-seat Royal Theater where the University Players stage their productions. The building's other features include a computer writing and instruction lab, a seminar room, a small screening room for film classes, and an office for Esprit, the university's Review of Arts and Letters. Additionally, the building contains stained glass in the lobby and an engraved quotation above the main entrance.

The building's exterior features "The Doorway to the Soul," a steel-and-wire sculpture by Pennsylvania artist Lisa Fedon. "The Doorway" consists of 18 framed images fabricated variously of steel plate, perforated steel, round steel bars and wire cloth which each represent experiences in the human journey towards truth while the grid itself represents a matrix of inner-connectedness. The individual panels within the grid are titled: The Thinker; Reaching Out To My Self; Natural and Curious Yearning of a Child; Eternal Bridge; Acceptance; A State of Calm, Peace, Knowing; Trials and Tribulation/The Ascent; The Void/God; The Writer; Father, Son, and Holy Spirit; Hope/Prayer; Christ; The Climb/The Worn Steps/The Invitation to Enter; The Written Word; Unconditional Love and Caring/Innocence of Children; The Self Exposed. The two external panels are: The Self Observing and The Only Begotten Son. Upon completion of the work, Panuska congratulated Fedon for her "artistic insight and great sensitivity in fulfilling the terms of the commission." He noted that in addition to bringing greater beauty to the campus, the works of art added to the campus in recent years are intended to help express the meaning and mission of the university to students, faculty, staff, and campus visitors. The commissioned work was a gift of Patrick J. and Marie Connors Roche, generous benefactors of the university and the namesakes of its Wellness Center.

At the dedication ceremony in 1993, the building was named in honor of the Hon. Joseph M. McDade because of "his continuous support of this area and of the University and its academic mission," Rev. Panuska noted.

The McDade Center location was once the site of Crawford House, the 1898 Tudor Revival home of coal operator, baron, and Peoples Coal Company owner James L. Crawford. In 1992, several years after Crawford's wife died, Lackawanna County purchased the estate to serve as the Juvenile Detention Center. In 1989, after four years of negotiations, the University of Scranton acquired Crawford House. Originally, the university planned to renovate and restore the property, where it would relocate the Admissions and Financial Aid offices as well as a combinations switchboard and a visitors area. However, the university discovered that the interior damage was too severe and that it would not be economically feasible to renovate it. Its decision to demolish Crawford House ignited fierce opposition from local historical organizations, such as the Lackawanna Historical Society, the State Historic Preservation Office, and the Architectural Heritage Association who believed the house "represent[ed] the lifestyle of a coal baron of the late nineteenth century," and was therefore significant for Scranton, a city founded on coal. In an attempt to compromise with those upset by the potential demolition of Crawford House, the university proposed that the building be relocated in order to preserve its historical aspects, but this proved too costly so Crawford House was demolished in 1991. Rather than using the site for administrative offices as originally planned, it would respond to a need identified in 1983 and become the Instructional Arts Facility, home to the English and Theater departments. The Crawford House was subsequently delisted from the National Register in 1992.

===== Alumni Memorial Hall =====
Formerly known as the Alumni Memorial Library, the building was extensively renovated in 1993 after the completion of the new Weinberg Memorial Library. It was converted to house the Psychology Department on the second floor, which had formerly been located in O’Hara Hall, as well as the Division of Planning and Information Resources, which was formerly known as the University Computing and Data Services Center. The new location in Alumni Memorial Hall "significantly enhance[d] educational and research facilities" for the Psychology Department, as John Norcross, chairman of the Psychology Department, remarked. It offers faculty offices with adjoining labs, two classrooms designated for psychology, a conference room, open labs for students, facilities which better house experimental equipment, and state-of-the-art animal facilities. The space for the University Computing System included a main computer room, private study areas, several computer labs such as a DOS lab and a Macintosh lab, help desks, staff offices and areas for computer programmers. Currently, the Division of Information Resources is responsible for providing technology-based services and solutions that support the work of the university, and guide the management of its information assets through the departments of Project Management, Network Infrastructure, Database Systems & Data Processing, Systems & Operations, Information Security Offices, IT Services, OIT Services, the Technology Support Center, and IT Development & Applications. Originally, the renovations also provided space for the offices for Institutional Research, Learning Resources and Instructional Development, which was later renamed the Center for Teaching and Learning Excellence and relocated to the fifth floor of the Loyola Science Center.

Completed in 1960, the two-story Alumni Memorial Library was designed to hold 150,000 volumes, as the collection at the time numbered approximately 62,000 volumes. It also had study space for approximately 500 students. The split-level design also included conference rooms, a music room, a visual aid room, microfilm facilities, and a smoking lounge. The buff, iron-spot building was considered cutting edge at the time, with glare-reducing thermo-pane glass, noise-reducing solid brick walls, radiant heating and cooling, and humidity control. Although originally estimated at $750,000, overall construction costs were approximately $806,000 after complications occurred when a massive mining cavity, complete with a network of surrounding tunnels, was discovered to lie only forty feet below the surface of the building site. Using a digging rig brought in from Texas, contractors sunk 33 steel casings into the ground, each more than 40 feet long, and then poured concrete through them to form pillars in order to support the structure. To raise money for the construction, a fundraising campaign led by Judge James F. Brady sought individual contributions from all the alumni.

===== Roche Wellness Center =====
The Roche Wellness Center, located at the corner of Mulberry and North Webster, was acquired in 1992 and opened in 1996. Originally built in 1986 by pharmacist Alex Hazzouri, the Wellness Center previously housed Hazzouri's pharmacy and drugstore as well as a restaurant named Babe's Place. In 1989, Alex Hazzouri was arrested and arraigned on drug-trafficking charges and his pharmacy was closed indefinitely, as the government seized the building. After the investigation was closed, the government auctioned off the building in 1992. It was purchased by the university for $500,000. Beginning on August 2, 1993, it served as a home to the Scranton Police Department's Hill Section precinct station. A new Student Health and Wellness Center was soon moved in, along with the university's Drug and Alcohol Information Center and Educators (DICE) Office. In 1996, the Roche Wellness Center opened, housing the Student Health Services department. The building holds a reception area, four exam rooms, a laboratory, an assessment room, an observation room, and storage space.

===== Parking and Public Safety Pavilion =====
Completed in 1995, the Parking and Public Safety Pavilion accommodates 510 cars in its five stories. It was constructed to expand on-campus parking, with designated areas for students, faculty, staff, and guests. Additionally, the parking garage contains the offices of the university's police and the offices of parking services. The structure, which occupies 163,000 square feet, is located on the corner of Mulberry and Monroe. The exterior complements the adjacent McDade Center for Literary and Performing Arts by mirroring its design. The Monroe Avenue facade is also covered by a series of topiary planting screens on which climbing vines have grown.

===== Institute of Molecular Biology and Medicine =====
Completed in August 1996, the Institute of Molecular Biology and Medicine was funded by a $7.5 million grant from the U.S. Air Force and the Department of Defense. The 1,500-square-foot facility houses research laboratories, offices, and the Northeast Regional Cancer Institute. The IMBM is dedicated to molecular biological research, chiefly in the field of proteomics, or the study of the full set of proteins encoded by a genome. The building was created to speed up the process of finding and treating viral diseases and cancer as well as to be able to engineer a patient's immune system to avoid these diseases and to develop DNA probes that could possibly seek out a defective gene that is responsible for cancer. The laboratories are equipped with technologically advanced systems used in the medical research field and each lab was designed for a specific purpose, such as genetic engineering, sequencing of DNA, and fluorescent microscopy. It contains the most advanced proteomics laboratory in the region. Additionally, the institute has the capability to handle Level 3 pathogens.

===== Mosque =====
In 1996, the university community, under Panuska's direction, renovated a University-owned house at 317 North Webster Avenue into the Campus Mosque as a gift to the Muslim community of Scranton. The university responded to the need for a local mosque for the growing number of Muslim students, as previously Scranton had no mosques, with the closest one being at Wilkes-Barre. Muslim students and faculty recited prayers several times a day in apartments or dorms. The Scranton Muslim community stated that “It [was] a spiritually uplifting experience to have our own mosque on campus.” The mosque reflects the growing diversity of the university's student body and its commitment to meeting the spiritual needs of all members of the university community.

The Mosque contained two large, spacious rooms, the women's and men's prayer rooms, as well as a library housing countless reference books on the history of Islam and the Muslim religion, including translations of the interpretations of the Koran. The Mosque was also equipped with an upstairs apartment where two members of the Muslim Student Association lived and served as caretakers of the facility.

In 2007, the Mosque, along with several other properties, was razed in order to establish a site for the sophomore residence, Condron Hall. The university then purchased and renovated a house at 306 Taylor Avenue for use as the new mosque, which is open to the public for prayer and reflection.

===== Mary Eileen Patricia McGurrin, R.N., M.S.N. Hall =====
Construction on McGurrin began in 1997 while Panuska was serving as president, although it was finished after he had resigned from the presidency. Completed in 1998, McGurrin Hall houses many of the departments in the J.A. Panuska College of Professional Studies, including Education, Nursing, Counseling and Human Services, and Health Administration and Human Resources. The departments of Exercise Science, Occupational Therapy, and Physical Therapy, also part of the Panuska College, are housed in the adjacent Center for Rehabilitation Education. McGurrin's four stories include classrooms, laboratories, teaching instruction labs, and counseling suites as well as the Panuska College of Professional Studies’ advising center and administration offices. When it was built, McGurrin was outfitted with the latest, most advanced technology in its labs and media-based equipment to deal with instruction in electronic media.

McGurrin Hall is named in honor of Mary Eileen Patricia McGurrin, R.N., M.S.N., a former student at the University of Scranton and the daughter of Kathleen Hyland McGurrin and the late John F. McGurrin Sr. Ms. McGurrin was an honors student at Abington Heights High School and earned her bachelor's and master's degrees in nursing from Thomas Jefferson College of Allied Health Services in Philadelphia. A member of the American Nurses Association, she was a registered nurse who served on the staff of Wills Eye Hospital in Philadelphia following completion of her training. She died of cancer in 1995 at the age of thirty-nine. In loving memory of his niece, McGurrin's uncle, Bernard V. Hyland, M.D., made a significant contribution to the Campaign for Scranton, which helped finance the building named in her memory. Dr. Hyland hoped that all of the students who pass through the doors of McGurrin Hall will be filled with the same spirit of selfless service animated by Mary Eileen. University President Rev. McShane noted that "it’s really appropriate and magnificent that the home of a professional studies is named for a nurse."

====== Leahy Community Health & Family Center ======
In 2003, the University of Scranton opened the Leahy Community Health & Family Center, which is located on the bottom floor of McGurrin Hall. The Leahy Community Health & Family Center serves the dual purpose of identifying and meeting the health and wellness needs of underserved individuals in the greater Scranton community while providing a place where faculty guide students in a practical educational experience. Faculty, graduate students, and undergraduate students from the Panuska College of Professional Studies, along with Pennsylvania licensed staff members, work together to fill gaps in health, wellness, and educational services offered to marginalized and underserved populations. The Center provides a multitude of services to those with special needs, children and families, senior citizens, the homeless, and the uninsured, which include the University of Success, the Alice V. Leahy Food and Clothing Pantry, the Edward R. Leahy, Jr. Center Clinic, "Peacemakers After School," and "Growing Stronger." The University of Success is a pre-college program designed to provide academic, social, and cultural enrichment and experiences to high school students. The ultimate goal of this program is to assist participating students to successfully complete high school and gain entrance into a college or university. The Alice V. Leahy Food and Clothing Pantry is a student-run effort to provide homeless and at-risk people with clean, decent clothing and the most basic of human needs, food. The Clinic provides free "non-emergency" health care to uninsured Lackawanna County residents who may otherwise forego health care due to cost, or seek care in hospital emergency rooms. The Clinic also provides physical therapy and counseling services. "Peacemakers After School" is a program for children between the ages of 9 and 13 and "Growing Stronger" is a program for area senior citizens. The Leahy Community Health & Family Center also offers numerous educational programs, health fairs and special clinics throughout the year. The Center includes a reception area, administrative offices, interview rooms with observation, and closed circuit video capabilities, examination rooms, disabled access and restrooms, and a large group activity/conference area as well as sophisticated equipment as the region's only motion analysis system, capable of analyzing movement and motor activity of people from infancy to advanced age.

The Leahy Community Health & Family Center "blends so completely the unique quality of the University of Scranton with [its] Jesuit mission" because it "provides a place for research, scholarship, and practical experience for faculty and students alike while responding to the needs of children in our region who have special needs," as University President Rev. McShane remarked. It embodies the Jesuit ideals of faith in action and serving others.

The Center is named for Edward J. Leahy, the late son of generous benefactors Patricia and Edward R. Leahy, who died at the age of eight due to his significant disabilities. The Center represents the Leahy's tradition of donating to support individuals with disabilities both indirectly through funding research and directly through assistance and service programs. In memory of Edward, the Leahys have "tried to engage in a continuous celebration of his life by helping others, particularly children, with special needs, but without sufficient resources to address those needs." Mr. Leahy noted that the Center "is a continuation of that celebration of Edward’s life, and it stands as proof that the youngest and the smallest among us can make a real difference."

=== Later career and death ===
Upon his resignation as president of the University of Scranton, Fr. Panuska served as the rector of the Jesuit community at the Jesuit Center in Wernersville, Pennsylvania, before eventually returning to the university, where he assisted in the work of campus ministry for a number of years. He later took up residence at health centers for older Jesuits, first at the St. Claude de la Colombière community in Baltimore and then in Manresa Hall in Merion, Pennsylvania, where he died on February 28, 2017.

== Other achievements and notable events ==
In 1969, Father Panuska received the Danforth Foundation's Harbison Prize for Distinguished Teaching.

In 1987, Panuska received the "Distinguished Alumni Award" from his high school, Baltimore Polytechnic Institute, at the school's 100th annual Alumni Association dinner. He addressed the Alumni Association at the dinner and also attended biology classes, where he lectured on aspects of low temperature biology, one of his research specialties.

In 1971, he was elected as editor-in-chief of the journal Cryobiology.

Throughout his life, Panuska was interested in biology and specialized in studies about environmental physiology, especially in the areas of hypothermia, natural hibernation, and organ preservation. He was a member of the American Physiology Society; the Society for Cryobiology; Sigma Xi; the Society for Experimental Biology and Medicine; the American Association for Higher Education; the Association of Catholic Colleges and Universities, and numerous other educational associations.

After his resignation from the presidency at the University of Scranton, the board of trustees made him the first president emeritus, to honor his legacy to the school.

In 1999, the university renamed the College of Health, Education, and Human Resources the "Panuska College of Professional Studies" in order to recognize "the vision, leadership, and service" of Rev. Panuska, under whom the university developed its strong academic programs, extensive and innovative facilities, and outreach to the community. Rev. McShane noted that Panuska was like the second founder of the university, so it was only fitting that the university should honor him by renaming the college he created in his name.

In 1999, Panuska was the first person to receive the University of Scranton's St. Thomas Aquinas Medal, which recognizes "persons who have shown clearly in word and action a signal, effective love for this institution" because of his extraordinary contributions to the university. At the presentation of the medal, Dr. Gerald P. Tracy, a former member of the university's board of trustees, described how Panuska demonstrated his great love for the university throughout his 16 years as president, stating that "Fr. Panuska walked among us, a smiling man of vision, warmed by the youthful students he had come to serve. He loved them and challenged them to grow in wisdom and grace on this campus and into the future. As a scholar with an international-reputation, he challenged a growing faculty not only to be excellent teachers, but to taste more fully the trials and joys of scholarship in their chosen fields." Tracy also noted that, through Panuska's tremendous efforts, "a true campus was created, one recognized for spaciousness, unity, and beauty."

In 2001, Rev. Panuska was awarded the Association of Independent Colleges and Universities of Pennsylvania (AICUP) Francis J. Michelini Award for Outstanding Service to Higher Education, which honors individuals whose work has significantly contributed to the quality of private higher education in Pennsylvania. The award recognized Panuska's sixteen-year tenure as the president of the University of Scranton, during which he led the university through a period of great expansion both on the physical plant of the campus as well as its academic programs.

Academic offices
Preceded by William J. Byron, S.J.	President of the University of Scranton; 1982–98	Succeeded by Joseph M. McShane, S.J.
