= List of presidents of the University of Scranton =

This article is a list of presidents of the University of Scranton, located in Scranton, Pennsylvania.

| No. | Name | Start | End | Ref. |
|---|---|---|---|---|
| 1. | John J. Mangan | 1892 | 1895 | |
| 2. | Daniel J. MacGoldrick, S.J. | 1895 | 1900 | |
| 3. | Fintan Andrew, F.S.C. | 1900 | 1904 | |
| 4. | Eligius Lewis, F.S.C. | 1904 | 1913 | |
| 5. | Abdas John, F.S.C. | 1913 | 1916 | |
| 6. | Edelwald Alban, F.S.C. | 1916 | 1919 | |
| 7. | Glastian Philip, F.S.C. | 1919 | 1922 | |
| 8. | Firmus Edward, F.S.C. | 1922 | 1925 | |
| 9. | George Lewis, F.S.C. | 1925 | 1931 | |
| 10. | Denis Edward, F.S.C. | 1931 | 1940 | |
| 11. | Eliseus Leonard, F.S.C. | 1940 | 1942 | |
| 12. | Frank J. O'Hara (Acting) | 1942 | 1942 | |
| 13. | W. Coleman Nevils, S.J. | 1942 | 1947 | |
| 14. | J. Eugene Gallery, S.J. | 1947 | 1953 | |
| 15. | John J. Long, S.J. | 1953 | 1963 | |
| 16. | Edward J. Sponga, S.J. | 1963 | 1965 | |
| 17. | Aloysius C. Galvin, S.J. | 1965 | 1970 | |
| 18. | Joseph A. Rock, S.J. (Acting) | 1970 | 1970 | |
| 19. | Dexter L. Hanley, S.J. | 1970 | 1975 | |
| 20. | Edwin A. Quain, S.J. (Acting) | 1975 | 1975 | |
| 21. | William J. Byron, S.J. | 1975 | 1982 | |
| 22. | Joseph A. Panuska, S.J. | 1982 | 1998 | |
| 23. | Joseph M. McShane, S.J. | 1998 | 2003 | |
| 24. | Scott Pilarz, S.J. | 2003 | 2011 | |
| 25. | Kevin Quinn, S.J. | 2011 | 2017 | |
| 26. | Herb Keller, S.J. | 2017 | 2018 | |
| 27. | Scott Pilarz, S.J. | 2018 | 2021 | |
| 28. | Jeff Gingerich, Ph.D. (Acting) | 2021 | 2021 | |
| 29. | Joseph G. Marina, S.J. | 2021 | present | |
