= Joseph M. McShane =

American theologian

The Reverend Joseph M. McShane SJ
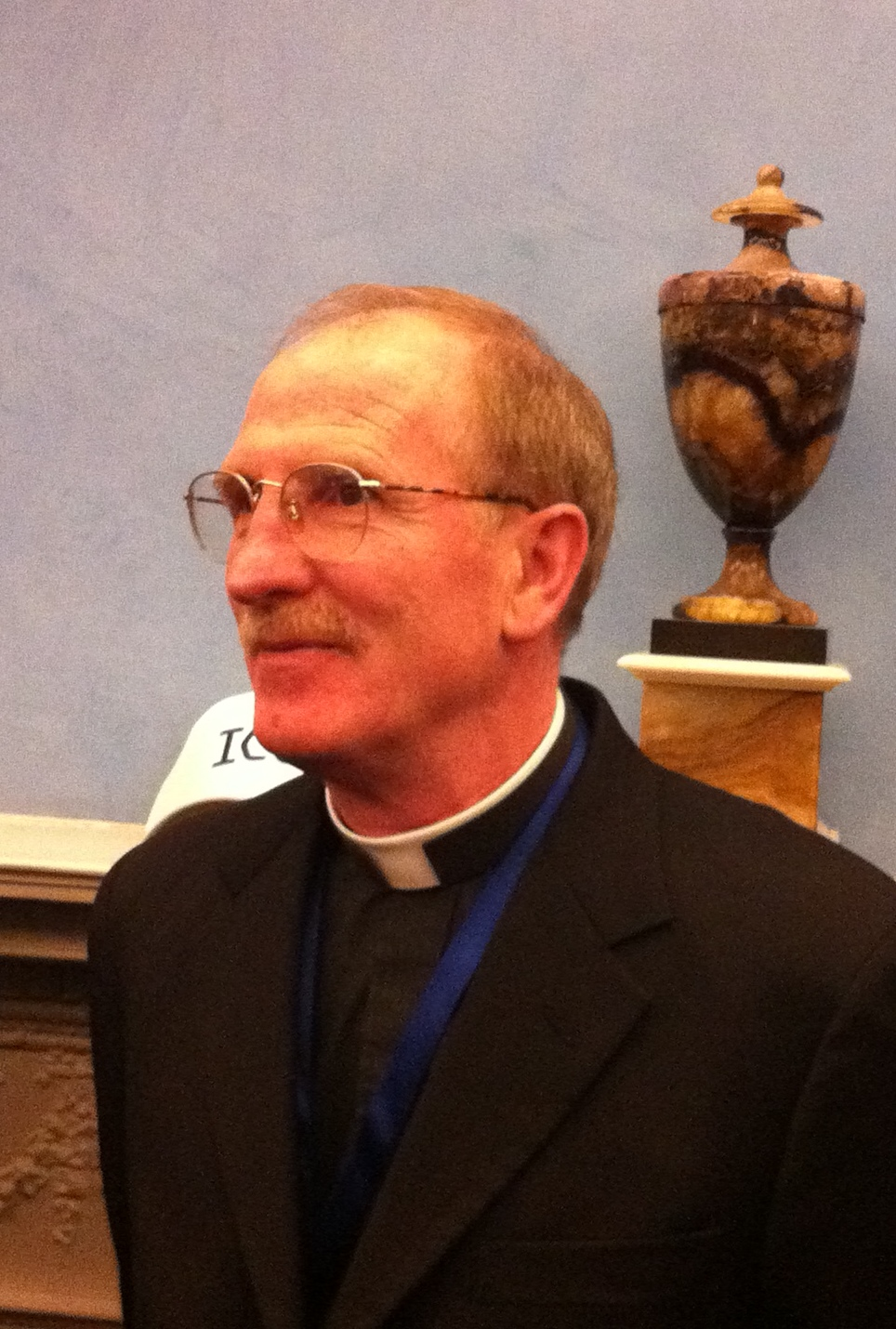

32nd President of Fordham University
- In office July 1, 2003 – July 1, 2022
- Preceded by: Joseph A. O'Hare
- Succeeded by: Tania Tetlow

23rd President of the University of Scranton
- In office 1998 – July 1, 2003
- Preceded by: Joseph A. Panuska
- Succeeded by: Scott Pilarz

Personal details
- Born: June 19, 1949 (age 76) New York City, New York, U.S.
- Education: Boston College; Jesuit School of Theology at Berkeley; University of Chicago
- Profession: Jesuit priest, academic

Joseph Michael McShane SJ (born June 19, 1949) is an American Jesuit priest, who served as President of Fordham University from 2003 until his retirement in 2022. Before becoming President of Fordham University, McShane was the President of the University of Scranton and Dean of Fordham College at Rose Hill. In addition to his role as President of Fordham, McShane was appointed to the Commission on Metropolitan Transportation Authority (MTA) Financing by New York Governor David A. Paterson in 2008. On July 1, 2009, McShane threw out the ceremonial first pitch at Yankee Stadium to commemorate the 150th anniversary of baseball at Fordham. In September 2021, he announced his resignation in June 2022. Soon after his resignation, he was unanimously named President Emeritus of the university by Fordham's Board of Trustees.

== Background ==
McShane grew up in New York City and graduated from Regis High School in 1967. He earned his bachelor's degree from Boston College and went on to earn a master's degree from the same institution in 1972. In 1977, McShane was ordained as a Jesuit priest, after receiving his M.Div and S.T.M. degrees from the Jesuit School of Theology at Berkeley. In 1981, McShane received his Ph.D. in the history of Christianity from the University of Chicago.

== Career ==
From 1982 to 1992, McShane served as a professor of religious studies and eventually chair of religious studies at Le Moyne College. In 1992 he was made Dean of Fordham College at Rose Hill, the largest undergraduate college of Fordham University, where he served until 1998. That year, McShane left Fordham to become the president of the University of Scranton, a Jesuit institution. In 2003 McShane was inaugurated as the 32nd President of Fordham University, the post he held until June 2022.

Currently, McShane is a trustee of Fordham University ex officio, Santa Clara University in California, the YMCA of Greater New York, and the Commission on Independent Colleges and Universities. He formerly served on the board of Loyola University New Orleans. McShane also serves on the board of the Association of Jesuit Colleges and Universities. He also serves on the Bloomberg Philanthropies Board of Directors.

In 2006 McShane unveiled a plan to enhance the reputation and the quality of education at Fordham University. The long-term goal of the University, according to McShane's plan, is to make Fordham the country's preeminent Catholic institution of higher learning. McShane believes that Fordham's location within New York City and its identity as a Jesuit institution are central to this vision. McShane has identified four key components of this strategic plan, as stated in a University press release:

- to advance the culture of scholarship, teaching, research and service for faculty by investing in endowed chairs and faculty development to enhance recruitment and retention and secure world-class stature for University professors
- to develop graduate and professional programs that can win distinctive excellence, national prominence and external support, as well as enhance the graduate and professional learning environment
- to develop and sustain an undergraduate culture of learning and living that will be recognized for distinctive excellence and achieve national prominence
- to generate and sustain the funding necessary to support investments in physical resources and the University endowment, and to fuel growth in annual giving.

Part of the plan was entitled Toward 2016, a reference toward the 175th anniversary of the founding of Fordham University. This 10-year phase was approved in 2005, and sought to raise Fordham to prominence among American Catholic universities by 2016.

Additionally, McShane has unveiled an ambitious plan for the Lincoln Center Campus of Fordham University. The plan involves razing several buildings on the 8-acre (32,000 m^{2}) Lincoln Center campus to make room for a new School of Law, an expanded library, student housing, a student activities center, and parking facilities. The plan will add an additional 1,500,000 square feet (140,000 m^{2}) of space to the campus. On June 30, 2009, the plan was approved by the New York City Council.

McShane served as President of Fordham University for 19 years. On September 2, 2021, McShane announced that he intended to step down as president at the end of the school year in June 2022. In February 2022, Tania Tetlow was announced as his successor. Shortly afterwards, McShane was named President Emeritus of the University by the Board of Trustees.

Since his retirement from Fordham, McShane served as special assistant to the President of Canisius University in Buffalo, New York, until being named Superior of the Jesuit Community at Scranton University on July 31, 2024.

== Criticism ==
On April 19, 2017, Fordham University faculty voted no confidence in President McShane's leadership, based on persistent violations of shared governance and his administration's management of a labor dispute with the University's contingent faculty. The vote was an unprecedented 88% in favor of no confidence. However, the Board of Trustees took responsibility for some of the issues at play, a position contradicted by faculty experience.

== Honors ==
In 2004, the University of Scranton bestowed an honorary degree on McShane in recognition of his service as president. In 2005, the University dedicated the Executive Education Center on the fifth floor of Brennan Hall in his honor.

In 2022, Fordham University dedicated its newly renovated student center as the Joseph M. McShane S.J. Campus Center.

In 2024, McShane received the Rev. Theodore M. Hesburgh, CSC, Award from the Association of Catholic Colleges and Universities.

Academic offices
Preceded by Joseph A. Panuska	President of the University of Scranton; 1998–2003	Succeeded by Scott Pilarz
Preceded by Joseph A. O'Hare	President of Fordham University; 2003–2022	Succeeded by Tania Tetlow
