= W. Coleman Nevils =

American Jesuit educator (1878–1955)

The Reverend W. Coleman Nevils SJ
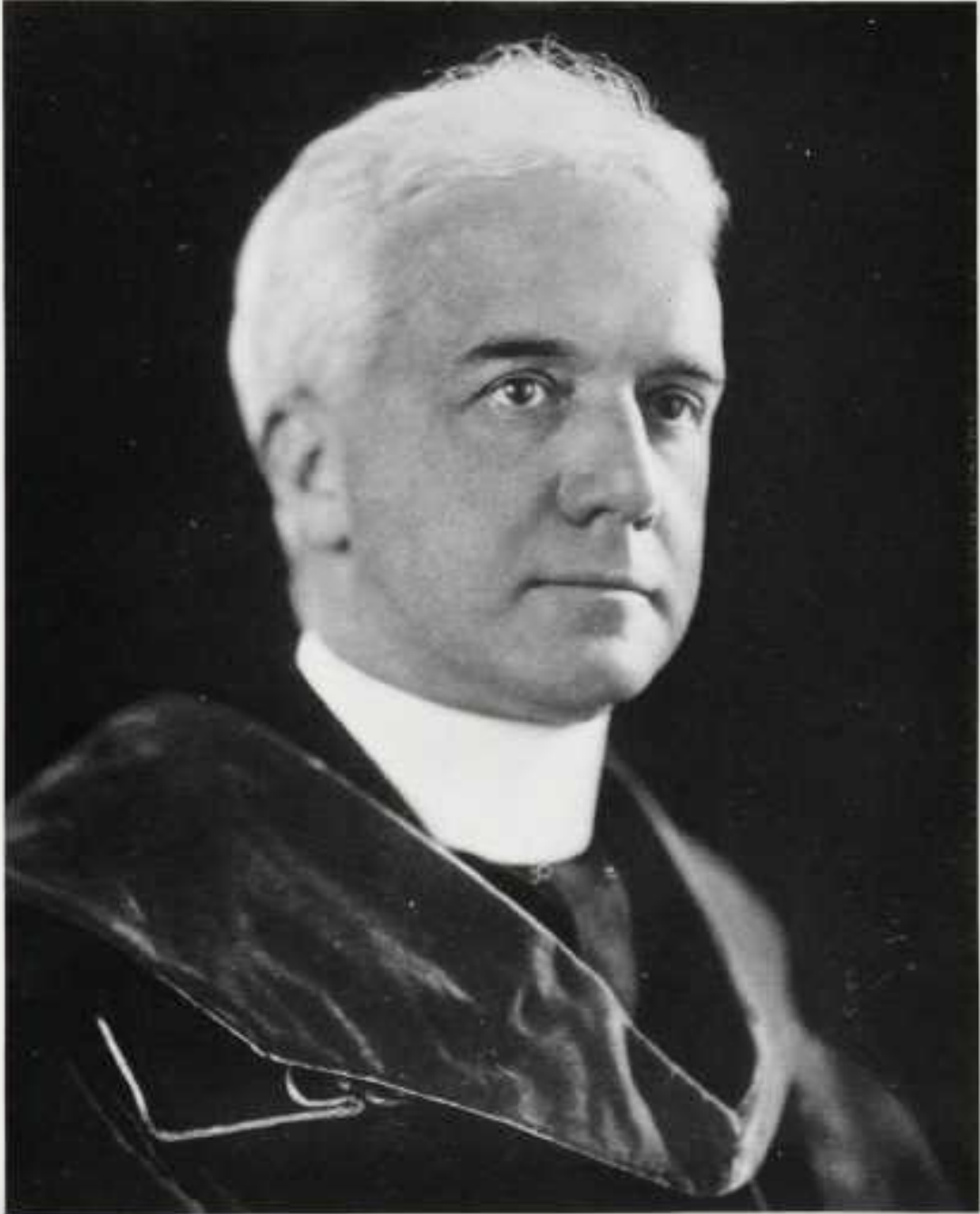
- Nevils in 1934

12th President of the University of Scranton
- In office 1942–1947
- Preceded by: Frank J. O'Hara
- Succeeded by: J. Eugene Gallery

39th President of Georgetown University
- In office 1928–1935
- Preceded by: Charles W. Lyons
- Succeeded by: Arthur A. O'Leary

Personal details
- Born: May 29, 1878 Philadelphia, Pennsylvania, United States
- Died: October 12, 1955 (aged 77) New York City, U.S.
- Resting place: Jesuit Community Cemetery
- Education: Saint Joseph's College (BA, MA); Woodstock College (PhD)

Orders
- Ordination: 1911

William Coleman Nevils SJ (May 29, 1878 – October 12, 1955) was an American Catholic priest and Jesuit educator who became the head of numerous Jesuit institutions throughout the northeastern United States, including Georgetown University and the University of Scranton. Born in Philadelphia, he was educated at Saint Joseph's College, before entering the Society of Jesus. While studying for the priesthood, he taught at Boston College and the Loyola School. After receiving his doctorate from Woodstock College, he held professorships at St. Andrew-on-Hudson and the College of the Holy Cross, before transferring to Georgetown University, where he became the dean of Georgetown College, the academic vice president, and the regent of the School of Foreign Service. He then left Georgetown to become the dean of the Shadowbrook Jesuit House of Studies.

In 1928, Nevils was made the president of Georgetown University. He became active in elite circles in Washington, D.C., and elevated the prominence of the university in diplomatic and political circles. He also made substantial progress on a highly ambitious plan to transform the campus. After completing several Collegiate Gothic buildings, work on the Greater Georgetown plan stalled because of the Great Depression. In 1935, he left Georgetown and returned to New York City, where he became the president of Regis High School and the Loyola School, as well as pastor of the Church of St. Ignatius Loyola.

Though near retirement, Nevils became the first Jesuit president of the University of Scranton in 1942, after the Lasallian Brothers departed the school. He led the university through a change in administration, and the decline of enrollment due to World War II. During his presidency, the curriculum was improved, and Scranton Preparatory School was founded. After the end of the war, Nevils also saw the school through a surge in enrollment due to the G.I. Bill.

Nevils returned to New York City in 1947, and became the head of America magazine, and the superior of Campion House, the residence for the Jesuit editors of the publication. He also continued to teach at Regis and Loyola and minister at St. Ignatius Church, until his death in 1955.

== Early life ==
William Coleman Nevils was born on May 29, 1878, in Philadelphia, Pennsylvania, to Andrew P. and Mary Coleman Nevils. He attended Saint Joseph's College in Philadelphia, receiving a Bachelor of Arts and Master of Arts. He entered the Society of Jesus on August 14, 1896, and went to teach Latin and Ancient Greek at Boston College. In 1903, he transferred to the Loyola School in New York City, where he also taught Latin and Greek, and would remain until 1908. Nevils then began his higher studies at Woodstock College in Maryland, where he was ordained a priest in 1911. He completed his priestly training at St. Andrew-on-Hudson, and received a Doctor of Philosophy in philosophy from Woodstock.

=== Teaching career ===
After receiving his doctorate, Nevils became a professor of rhetoric at St. Andrew-on-Hudson. He then transferred to the College of the Holy Cross as a professor of philosophy. After some time, Nevils became a lecturer in sociology at Georgetown University, and in 1918, was named the dean of Georgetown College. In 1919, he simultaneously became the chancellor (academic vice president) of the university, and in 1920, was made the regent of the School of Foreign Service. His tenure as dean came to an end in 1922.

After six years, Nevils left Georgetown in 1924 to become the dean of the Shadowbrook House of Jesuit Studies in Massachusetts, where he would remain for four years. In addition to being dean, he taught rhetoric and pedagogy at Shadowbrook. In 1925, he was proposed to become the next president of Boston College, but it as decided that someone from the Jesuits' New England province would be more suitable.

== Georgetown University ==
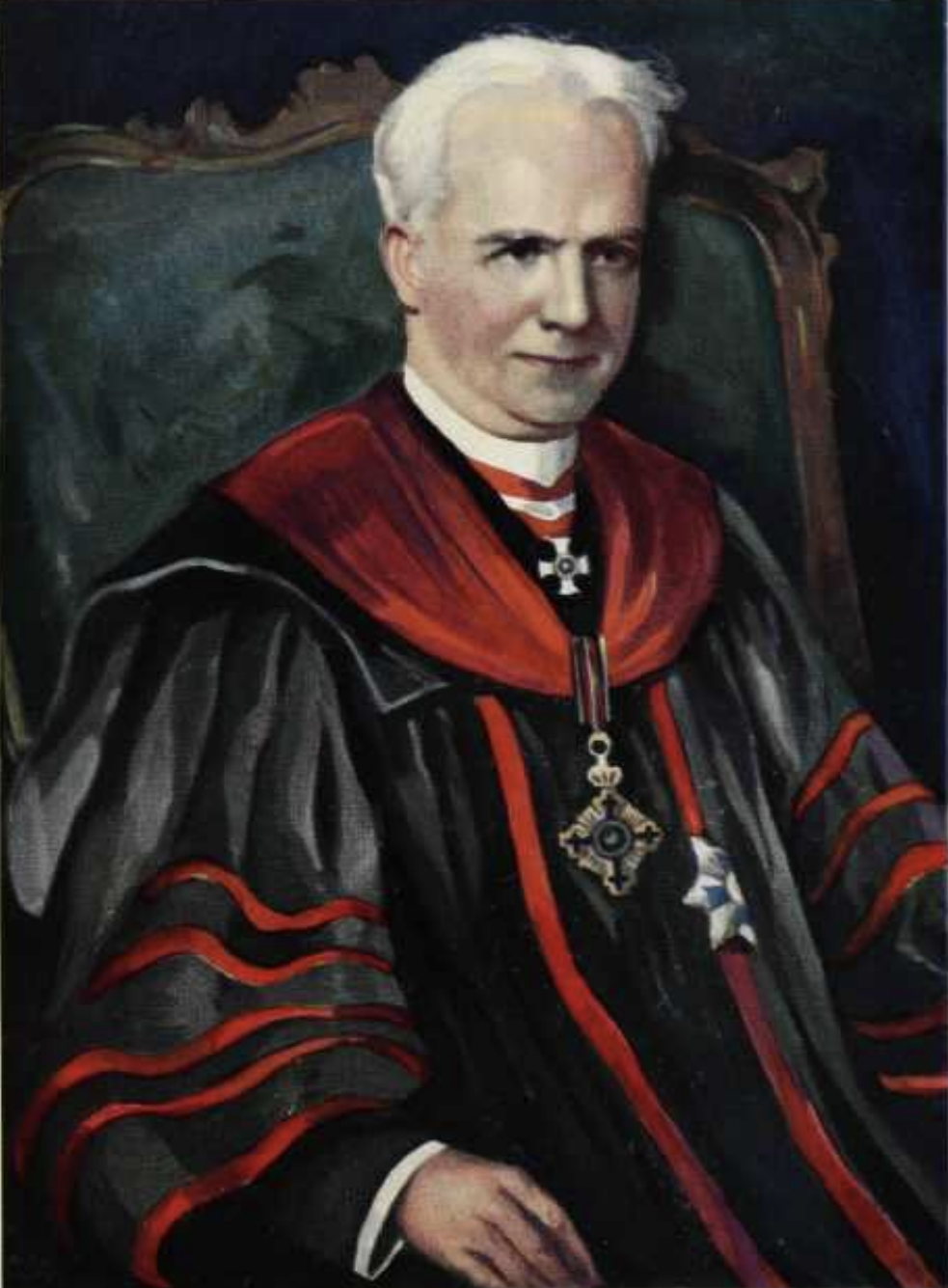
Nevils in academic regalia in 1933

On August 27, 1928, Nevils was elected the president of Georgetown University by the university's board of directors. His inauguration in late October was attended by representatives of 93 American and foreign universities, 26 learned societies, and members of the diplomatic corps, forming the largest gathering of educators ever held at a Catholic college in the United States. This was the first time the installation of a new president of the university was marked by a formal inauguration. During the ceremony, Nevils was awarded a Doctor of Divinity.

Nevils' presidency was characterized by an unprecedented level of engagement with communities outside of the university. One of his priorities was establishing Georgetown as a presence in the political and diplomatic circles of Washington, D.C. He revived the board of regents as a body focused on fundraising, and appointed alumni, as well as business leaders without any connection to Georgetown. He frequently hosted on-campus receptions for various dignitaries and attended diplomatic events in the city. He also became a fourth degree member of the Knights of Columbus, and a member of the Cosmos Club. These overtures were effective in raising the prominence of Georgetown in Washington's elite circles.

During the course of his presidency, Nevils reformed the curriculum of Georgetown College. He recruited several prominent faculty and increased the number of those with doctorates. He also abolished an abbreviated two-year pre-medical program, requiring students intending to go to medical school to complete the standard four-year undergraduate curriculum. Clinical research at the medical school improved under the direction of increasingly prominent clinical faculty. Nevils also raised the stature of the dental department. Throughout his presidency, Nevils aimed to increase the percentage of the faculty who were Catholic.

In 1934, Nevils' second term as president was coming to an end, and a group of faculty and alumni petitioned the Jesuit Superior General to allow Nevils to remain, given the economic turmoil and his proven ability as president. The superior general agreed to allow Nevils to remain for one additional year. In that time, Nevils identified Arthur A. O'Leary as his desired successor. After receiving approval in Rome, O'Leary succeeded Nevils as president in 1935. At the time he resigned, he was the longest-serving president in the university's history, by a margin of six years. In addition to his duties as president, Nevils served as a member of the President's Organization for Unemployment Relief, the United States Naval Academy's board of visitors, and the National Committee on Inter-American Intellectual Cooperation.

=== Greater Georgetown plan ===
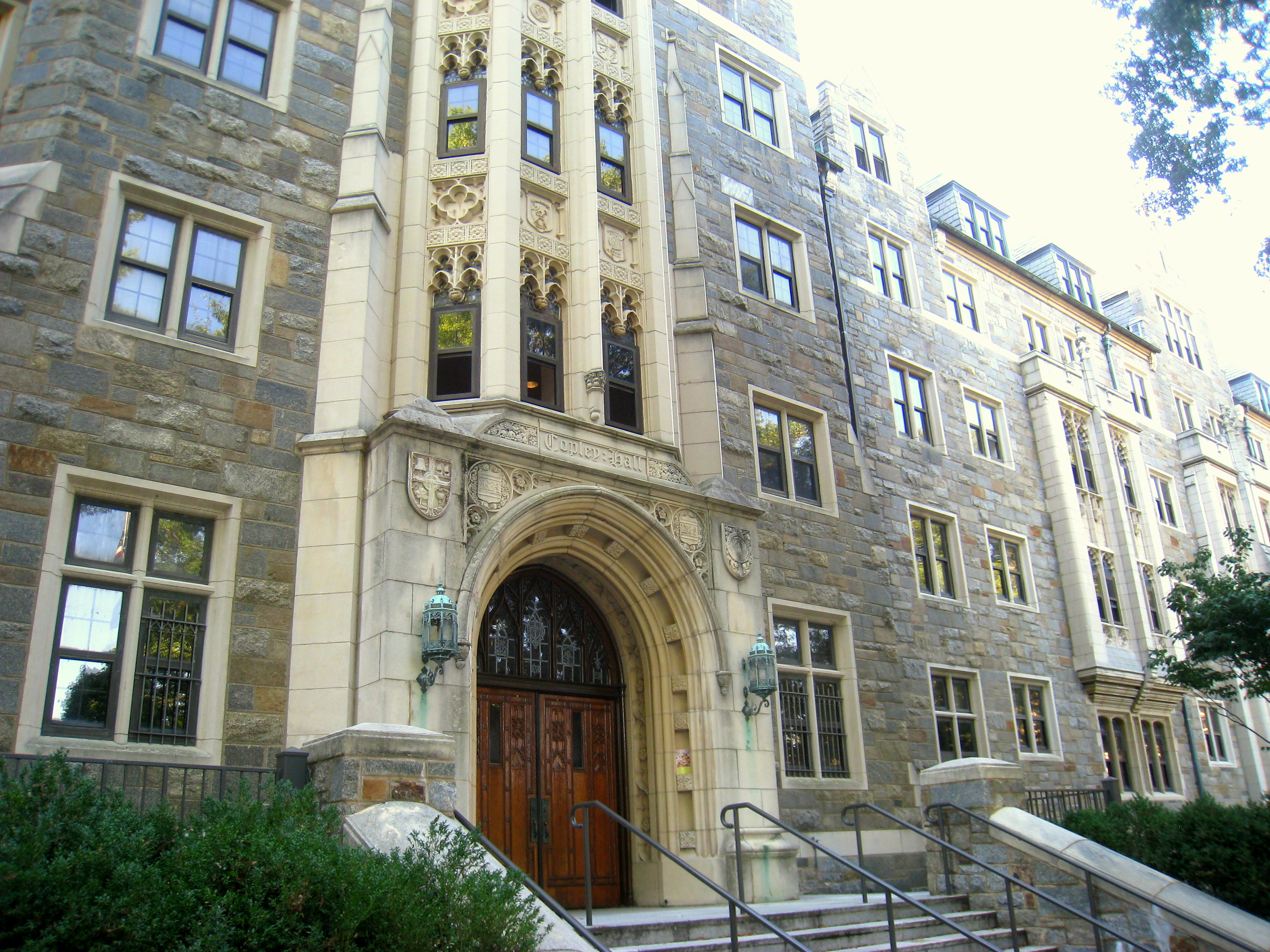
Copley Hall was the first building of the Greater Georgetown plan completed.

One of Nevils' first acts as president was reviving the "Greater Georgetown" plan, which had been devised in the early 1920s, but abandoned by his predecessor, Charles W. Lyons, and for which Nevils had been the primary fundraiser. This plan called for a major expansion of the university's facilities and a consolidation of its schools. The first component of this plan began on January 3, 1929, with the groundbreaking of a new home for Georgetown's School of Medicine. The Medical-Dental Building opened on the northwest corner of the campus in May of the following year. The most ambitious portion of the Greater Georgetown plan was the creation of a new Collegiate Gothic quadrangle, designed by the Philadelphia architect Emile G. Perrot, which would be enclosed by Healy Hall and three new buildings. These buildings would house a dormitory, classrooms, and science facilities, and would cost $2.5 million, equivalent to $46.9 million in 2025. While the original Greater Georgetown plan envisioned the quadrangle being named for the alumnus and Supreme Court Chief Justice Edward Douglass White, Nevils instead changed the name to the Andrew White Memorial Quadrangle, after the early Jesuit missionary to the United States.

Construction on the first component of the quadrangle, the dormitory named Copley Hall, began in 1930. Soon after announcing the project, Nevils was able to quickly raise funds for its construction, despite the beginning of the Great Depression. With funds already secured, the depression actually worked in favor of the university, as it drove down the cost of construction, and the project was finished under budget. Copley Hall, named for the Jesuit missionary, Thomas Copley, officially opened on February 16, 1931, and housed 221 students, a chapel, and a reading lounge. Fundraising for the second building, which would contain chemistry laboratories, classrooms, and administrative offices was more difficult, but construction was able to begin in June 1932. The building was named White-Gravenor Hall, after Andrew White and John Gravenor, two Jesuit missionaries. Rising four stories, its facade was composed of granite quarried from northern Maryland and gray stone repurposed from a recently dismantled bridge spanning Rock Creek. The building was completed in November 1933, and housed 20 classrooms, and several laboratories and large lecture halls. Nevils drew praise for being able to open two grand buildings in the midst of a depression without taking on any debt.

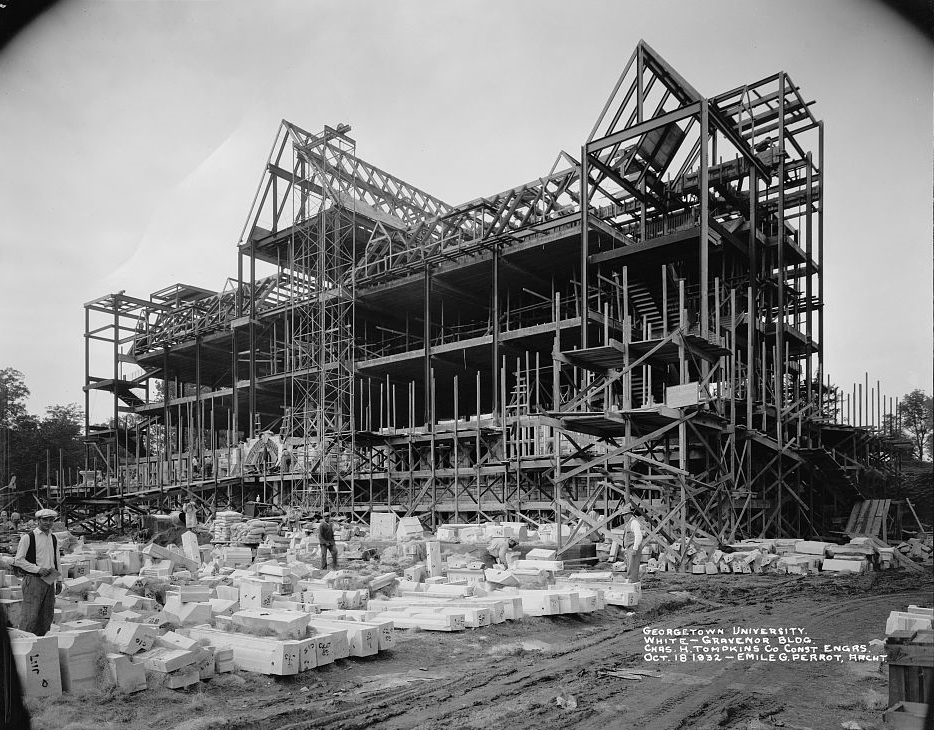
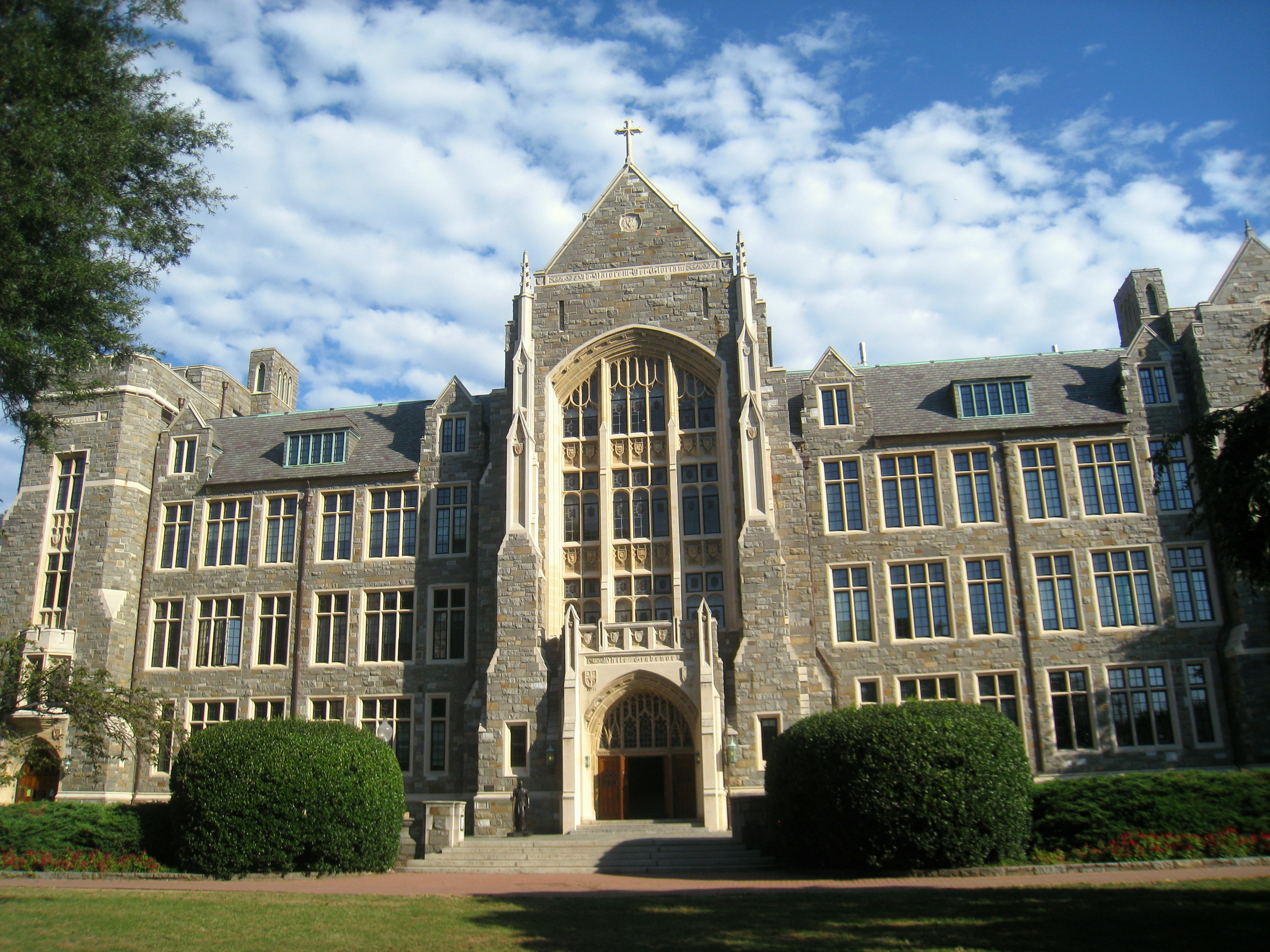
White-Gravenor Hall during and after construction

Despite desiring to continue with the ambitious plan to transform the campus, Nevils' intention to complete the Great Georgetown plan was eventually thwarted by the Great Depression. Among his plans that did not come to fruition were the enclosure of the quadrangle with a fourth building, the construction of a new home for the Georgetown University Hospital next to the Medical-Dental Building, the conversion of the existing hospital building at 35th and N Streets into a dormitory for professional student, and the construction of a 4,000-seat gymnasium on 37th Street between O and N Streets. He also sought to relocate the School of Foreign Service and Law School to the main campus. When Georgetown received word that President Franklin Roosevelt was about to close the banks in 1933, it withdrew $200,000 from Riggs Bank and kept it in the rooms of Edmund A. Walsh and the university's treasurer. While the number of undergraduate students dropped significantly between 1928 and 1933, the professional schools saw a slight increase.

== Return to teaching ==
After leaving Georgetown University, Nevils returned to New York City in 1935. There, he became the pastor of the Church of St. Ignatius Loyola, and the president of both Regis High School and the Loyola School. He held all of these positions simultaneously for five years. For a time, he was also the pastor of St. Aloysius Church. He then returned to Washington in 1940, where while living at Georgetown Preparatory School, he wrote a book about the history of the Jesuits in the United States, in commemoration of the 400th anniversary of the founding of the order. At the same time, he was made the archivist of Georgetown University and the director of its libraries. While in Washington, Nevils lectured on sacred eloquence at Woodstock College, and developed a reputation as a talented and sought-after preacher.

== University of Scranton ==
In 1942, the Bishop of Scranton, William Hafey, invited the Society of Jesus to take over the administration and ownership of the University of Scranton, which until then had been run by the Lasallian Brothers, who found themselves unable to supply a sufficient number of brothers to staff the school. The Jesuits accepted, and Hafey announced the change to the public on June 12; three days later, the Lasallian Brothers left Scranton. In the interim of the Brothers' departure and the Jesuits' full arrival, the school was run by a layman, Frank O'Hara, as the acting chief executive. The first three Jesuits arrived on June 24, where they found the first classes of the academic year already underway. Nevils arrived on July 7, and was named the president of the university and rector of its Jesuit community by the Jesuit provincial superior. His selection as president came as a surprise to some, as he was already nearing retirement age. The school's existing board of directors was dissolved, and a new one composed of only Jesuits was created. Bishop Hafey then conveyed ownership of all the university property to the new board. With the transition complete, the University of Scranton became the 24th Jesuit university in the United States.

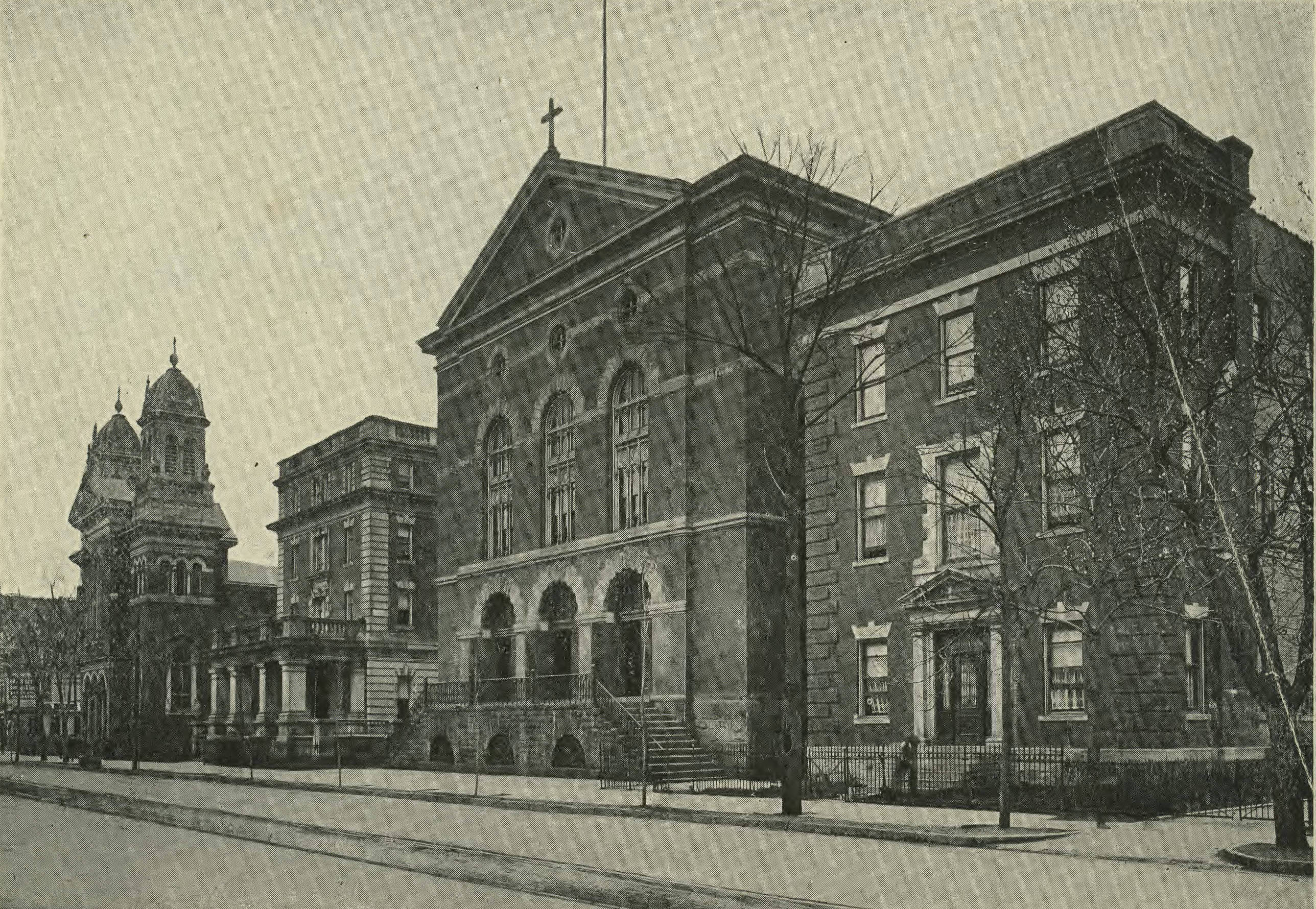
Old Main building (center) housed the entire university's academic facilities.

While the university's situation was uncertain, with a large portion of the student body being drafted to fight in World War II, the university's enrollment remained substantial during the early years of the war. An accelerated three-year curriculum was in place, which had been implemented in the aftermath of the attack on Pearl Harbor. With the number of students eventually reduced, the university's sole academic building, Old Main, accommodated all of its classrooms and administrative offices. To offset some of the declining enrollment, the university created an aviation program that trained cadets for the Army Air Corps and the Navy.

The school's finances were also stabilized by requiring the payment of partial tuition upfront, which had previously often gone unpaid. With the Lasallian Brothers' former residence being inadequate to accommodate the number new Jesuits, Nevils decided to convert elaborate Scranton family mansion, which had been recently donated to the bishop, into the Jesuit residence. Shortly after renovating the old Thomson Hospital, known as the annex, it suffered a fire on December 23, 1943, which nearly destroyed the building.

The curriculum of the University of Scranton was improved to more closely align with the Ratio Studiorum, which placed a heavier emphasis on philosophy and logic. Nevils sought to establish good relations with the community, frequently speaking before local civic and religious associations. Facing requests from the bishop and local parents to create a high school for educating their younger children, Nevils established Scranton Preparatory School in 1944. It was housed in the annex, which was reconstructed after the fire.

With the end of the war in 1945, and the passage of the G.I. Bill, the university saw a wave of applicants. As enrollment increased dramatically, the University of Scranton soon outgrew its facilities. To accommodate this surge in enrollment, Nevils began leasing space in downtown Scranton, and holding day, twilight, and evening classes. Construction on three new, simple buildings began in 1946, and were completed the following year. Nevils' term as president came to an end in 1947, and he was succeeded by J. Eugene Gallery. While in Scranton, he also served as a member of the boards of directors of the International Textbook Company, International Correspondence Schools, the International Education Publishing Company, and the International Schools Company of Latin America.

== Later life ==
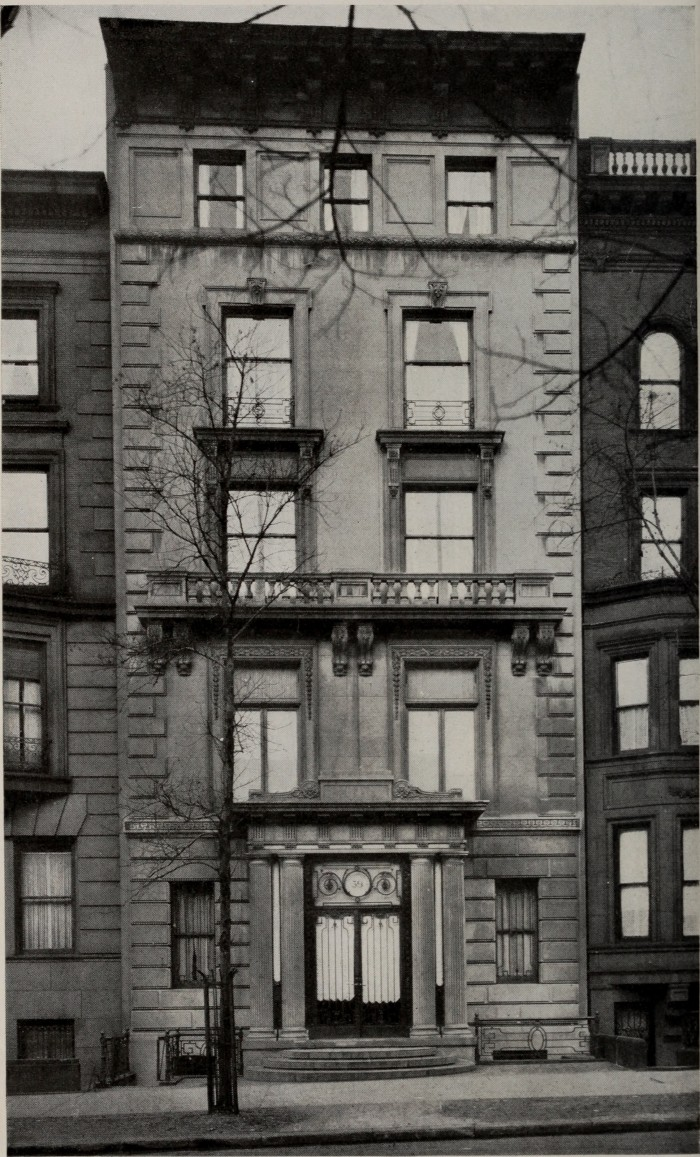
Campion House, the then-headquarters of America in New York City

After stepping down as president of Scranton, Nevils returned to New York City. There, he became the head of the Jesuit magazine America, and the president of its publisher, America Press. He also became the father superior of Campion House, the residence for the Jesuit editors of the magazine. In 1953, he returned to the Church of St. Ignatius Loyola as the spiritual director of the Jesuit community, where he would remain until his death. He also continued to teach at Regis High School and the Loyola School.

In February 1955, he became ill with coronary thrombosis. His health worsened in October, and he died on October 12, 1955, at St. Vincent's Hospital in New York City. A funeral service was held at the Church of St. Ignatius Loyola, and was attended by approximately 100 Jesuits. His body was returned to Georgetown University, where it was buried in the Jesuit Community Cemetery.

Throughout his life, Nevils had been honored by the governments of Yugoslavia, Chile, Romania, Czechoslovakia, France, and Jerusalem, and was admitted to the Order of the Crown of Italy in 1933. He also received honorary doctorates from Loyola University of Los Angeles and Saint Joseph's College. In 1957, Georgetown University created the Nevils Building, formed by connecting several former hospital buildings. In 1965, Nevils Hall, a student residence, was opened at the University of Scranton.

== Works ==
- Nevils, W. Coleman (1935). Miniatures of Georgetown, 1634 to 1934: Tercentennial Causeries. Washington, D.C.: Georgetown University Press. OCLC 84940818.
- Dwight, Walter (1947). Nevils, W. Coleman (ed.). The Saving Sense. New York: Declan X. McMullen. OCLC 990640.
- Nevils, W. Coleman (1953). A Moulder of Men: John H. O'Rourke, A Memoir. New York: Apostleship of Prayer. OCLC 977658123.

Academic offices
Preceded by Edmund A. Walsh	Dean of Georgetown College; 1918—1922	Succeeded by William T. Tallon
Preceded by —	Dean of the Shadowbrook House of Jesuit Studies; 1924—1928	Succeeded by —
Preceded by Charles W. Lyons	39th President of Georgetown University; 1928—1935	Succeeded by Arthur A. O'Leary
Preceded by William J. Devlin	7th President of Regis High School; 1935—1940	Succeeded by Francis A. McQuade
Preceded by William J. Devlin	9th President of the Loyola School; 1935—1940	Succeeded by Francis A. McQuade
Preceded by Frank J. O'Hara	12th President of the University of Scranton; 1942—1947	Succeeded by J. Eugene Gallery
Catholic Church titles
Preceded by William J. Devlin	Pastor of the Church of St. Ignatius Loyola; 1935—1940	Succeeded by Francis A. McQuade
