= Kevin Quinn (Jesuit) =

American Jesuit, lawyer, and law professor

The Reverend Kevin P. Quinn S.J.
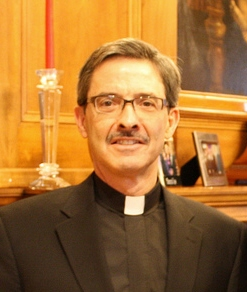
- Rev. Quinn in February 2012

25th President of the University of Scranton
- In office July 1, 2011 – May 31, 2017
- Preceded by: Rev. Scott Pilarz, S.J.

Personal details
- Born: 1955 (age 70–71) Queens, New York
- Education: Fordham University; Jesuit School of Theology at Berkeley; UC Berkeley School of Law
- Profession: Jesuit priest, lawyer, legal scholar

Kevin Patrick Quinn, S.J., (born on 23 December 1955) is an American Jesuit lawyer and professor who served as president of the University of Scranton from 2011 to 2017.

== Biography ==
=== Early life and education ===
Kevin Quinn was born in Queens, New York, and raised on Long Island. His father was a New York City Fire Department firefighter and gardener; his mother's name was Patricia. Quinn joined the Society of Jesus after high school in 1973.

He received a bachelor's degree from Fordham University in 1979. Quinn worked as a community organizer in the South Bronx while studying at Fordham University. He focused on disputes between tenants and their landlords, which began Quinn's interest in the law. In a December 2010 interview with the Scranton Times, Quinn noted, "I thought I could do a better job," after encountering lawyers who did a substandard job representing the interests of their clients and the larger community.

Quinn was ordained a Catholic priest of the Society of Jesus in 1985. He also earned a Master of Divinity from the Jesuit School of Theology at Berkeley, which is now known as the Jesuit School of Theology of Santa Clara University, in 1985. Quinn enrolled at the nearby UC Berkeley School of Law soon after the completion of his Master of Divinity. He received a Juris Doctor from UC Berkeley in 1988. He received an S.T.L. from the Jesuit School of Theology at Berkeley, in 1990, and a Ph.D. in Jurisprudence and Social Policy from the University of California at Berkeley in 1993.

=== Career ===
Quinn taught at Regis High School in Manhattan early in his career.

Quinn worked as a law clerk for Judge Joseph M. McLaughlin of the United States Court of Appeals for the Second Circuit in New York City after completing law school. He was admitted to both the New York City Bar Association and the District of Columbia bar association. He focused on issues in law pertaining to health care ethics, including stem cell research and end-of-life care. His writings and publications have focused on genetics, contemporary culture, and bioethics.

=== Georgetown University ===
Quinn began teaching law at Georgetown University in 1994, a position he held until 2006. Additionally, Quinn worked as Georgetown University's chaplain-in-residence. He also became a senior research fellow and faculty affiliate at Georgetown's Kennedy Institute for Ethics.

=== Santa Clara University ===
Quinn joined Santa Clara University in 2006 as the executive director of the Ignatian Center for Jesuit Education. He became a faculty member of the Santa Clara University School of Law in 2007, where he taught courses on bioethics.

=== President of the University of Scranton ===
University of Scranton President Fr. Scott Pilarz, was named President of Marquette University in September 2010. Pilarz had served as president at Scranton since 2003. A search was launched by the University of Scranton to find a successor.

On December 15, 2010, the University of Scranton's board of trustees, under chairman Christopher "Kip" Condron, unanimously voted to appoint Father Kevin Quinn as the university's 25th president.

Father Quinn took office as the University of Scranton's 25th president on July 1, 2011. His official inauguration took place on Friday, September 16, 2011, at the William J. Byron, S.J., Recreation Complex on the university's campus.

Quinn's inauguration celebrations included events and seminars throughout the week. Australian human rights activist and lawyer Father Frank Brennan, S.J., who is chairman of the Australian National Human Rights Consultation Committee and a law professor at Australian Catholic University, presented the inaugural lecture, "A Jesuit Perspective on Making Human Rights and Religion Friends, Not Foes", on September 13.

An inaugural concert held on September 17, 2011, included a new composition based on Philippians 4:4-8, described as Quinn's favorite passage from the Bible: "Rejoice in the Lord always; again I will say, Rejoice. Let your gentleness be known to everyone. The Lord is near."

Quinn has stated that a priority is maintaining the price of higher education in order to keep pace with prevailing economic demographics in Northeastern Pennsylvania. He resided in Condron Hall, a University of Scranton dorm, joking with local media, "It’s partly selfish. You live with 20-year-olds, it keeps you younger." On August 22, 2016, Father Quinn announced he would step down as University President, effective June 1, 2017.

Academic offices
Preceded by Scott Pilarz	President of the University of Scranton; 2011 – 2017	Succeeded by Scott Pilarz
