= William J. Byron =

American academic administrator and priest (1927–2024)

The Reverend William J. Byron SJ

President of the University of Scranton
- In office 1975–1982
- Preceded by: Dexter L. Hanley, S.J.
- Succeeded by: Joseph A. Panuska, S.J.

President of the Catholic University of America
- In office 1982–1992
- Preceded by: Edmund D. Pellegrino, M.D.
- Succeeded by: Brother Patrick Ellis, F.S.C.

Interim President of Loyola University New Orleans
- In office 2003–2004
- Preceded by: Bernard P. Knoth, S.J
- Succeeded by: Kevin Wm. Wildes, S.J.

President of St. Joseph's Preparatory School
- In office 2006–2008

Personal details
- Born: William James Byron; May 25, 1927 Pittsburgh, Pennsylvania, U.S.
- Died: April 9, 2024 (aged 96) Philadelphia, Pennsylvania, U.S.
- Education: St. Joseph's Preparatory School; St. Joseph's University; University of Maryland; Woodstock College; Saint Louis University
- Profession: Jesuit priest, academic

William James Byron, S.J. (May 25, 1927 – April 9, 2024) was an American priest of the Society of Jesus. Byron served as the president of the University of Scranton from 1975 to 1982 and the president of Catholic University of America from 1982 to 1992. At the time of his death, he was a professor of Business and Society at Saint Joseph's University in Philadelphia.

== Early life and education ==
William James Byron was born on May 25, 1927, in Pittsburgh, and raised in Philadelphia. He attended St. Joseph's Preparatory School, graduating in 1945. Upon his graduation, Byron served in the 508th Parachute Infantry Regiment of the United States Army in the Second World War from 1945 to 1946.

Before entering the Society of Jesus in 1950, he had been a student at St. Joseph’s University for three years. He was ordained in 1961.

Byron received a doctorate in economics from the University of Maryland. He also held two theology degrees from Woodstock College, a bachelor's degree in philosophy and a master's degree in economics from Saint Louis University. Over the course of his career, Father Bryon received more than twenty-five honorary degrees, including an honorary doctor of humane letters degree from the University of Scranton in 1982.

== Career ==
=== Early career ===
Father Byron served as a mathematics professor at Scranton Preparatory School from 1956 to 1958. In 1962 he was named assistant editor of America and from 1965 to 1966 he held a teaching fellowship and a U.S. Department of Labor Manpower Research Fellowship at the University of Maryland. From 1967 to 1969 he served as assistant professor of economics at Loyola University Maryland and served as adjunct professor of pastoral theology at Woodstock College, the most important center of Catholic teaching in the country. He was named associate professor of social ethics and director of field education at Woodstock College. When Woodstock moved from Maryland to New York City, he became rector of the Woodstock Jesuit Community. He also served as a lecturer at Union Theological Seminary in New York City.

=== President of the University of Scranton ===
In 1975, Father Byron became the president at the University of Scranton, succeeding Dexter L. Hanley, S.J. He served as president until he resigned in 1982. Father Panuska, the former academic vice president and dean of faculties at Boston College, succeeded Byron as Scranton’s next president. Under Byron’s leadership, the University of Scranton underwent significant changes, including gains in enrollment, increasing academic standing of the university, improvements, construction, and expansion on the campus, the addition of a number of academic majors and programs.

During Father Byron's tenure as president, total enrollment grew from 3,954 in the 1974–1975 academic year to 4,196 by the time of his departure in 1980–1981. The applicant pool, the total students applying for admission to the institution, was enlarged under Father Byron. Additionally, the acceptance ratio, the percentage of individuals accepted for admission to the university from the total percentage of applicants, fell from seventy-three percent to sixty percent. As Scranton became more selective during the admission process, it indicated the rising academic quality of the university. Byron also doubled the operating budget while also maintaining a positive balance in that budget each year and enhanced the administrative efficiency and ability to properly plan by introducing a computer-based Management Information System.

While president, Father Byron led the university through a successful three million capital fundraising campaign and then through a five-year, six million capital development program, which doubled the university’s endowment. One of the components of the development program, called “Commitments to Excellence,” was targeted at improving the physical plant of the campus as well as the greater Scranton/Wilkes-Barre community. In addition to Father Byron's work to receive approval to build the Linden Street Commons, Byron accomplished this project by organizing a number of other projects aimed at improving and expanding the physical campus, which included the purchase of a number of buildings, including Jefferson Hall to serve as an additional residence hall and center for student activities and “The Gallery” to house classrooms, offices, and study spaces. The university also created the Galvin Terrace, an athletic and recreational outdoor complex which contained six tennis courts, two combination basketball and volleyball courts, and recreational areas. Additionally, there were renovations to many of the residence halls. The development program also included plans to establish the School of Management and to extend the Office of Continuing Education to meet the needs of those in the greater community who wanted to continue their post-secondary education by offering a range of associate degrees and opportunities for local employers and employees to train at the corporate site or at the university. In addition to accomplishing these goals to expand the university's colleges, new academic programs were created under Father Byron, including international studies, nursing, physical therapy, law enforcement, public administration, family studies, and Byzantine studies.

In 1981, Father Byron announced his plans to leave the University of Scranton in June 1982, giving the board of trustees ample time to find a suitable replacement. The Board of Trustees picked Father Joseph Allen Panuska, S.J., to succeed him. As Judge Conaboy wrote in a letter after he heard of Byron's announcement to resign as President of the University of Scranton, Byron's accomplishments and improvements at the school combine with the establishment of the Scranton Journal, setting new records in medical school acceptances and Fulbright Scholarships, winning a national basketball championship in men's competition, and producing national title contenders in soccer and women's basketball, “to make a review of Byron's tenure at the University of Scranton an enormous success and a great contribution to this entire community.”

==== The University Commons ====
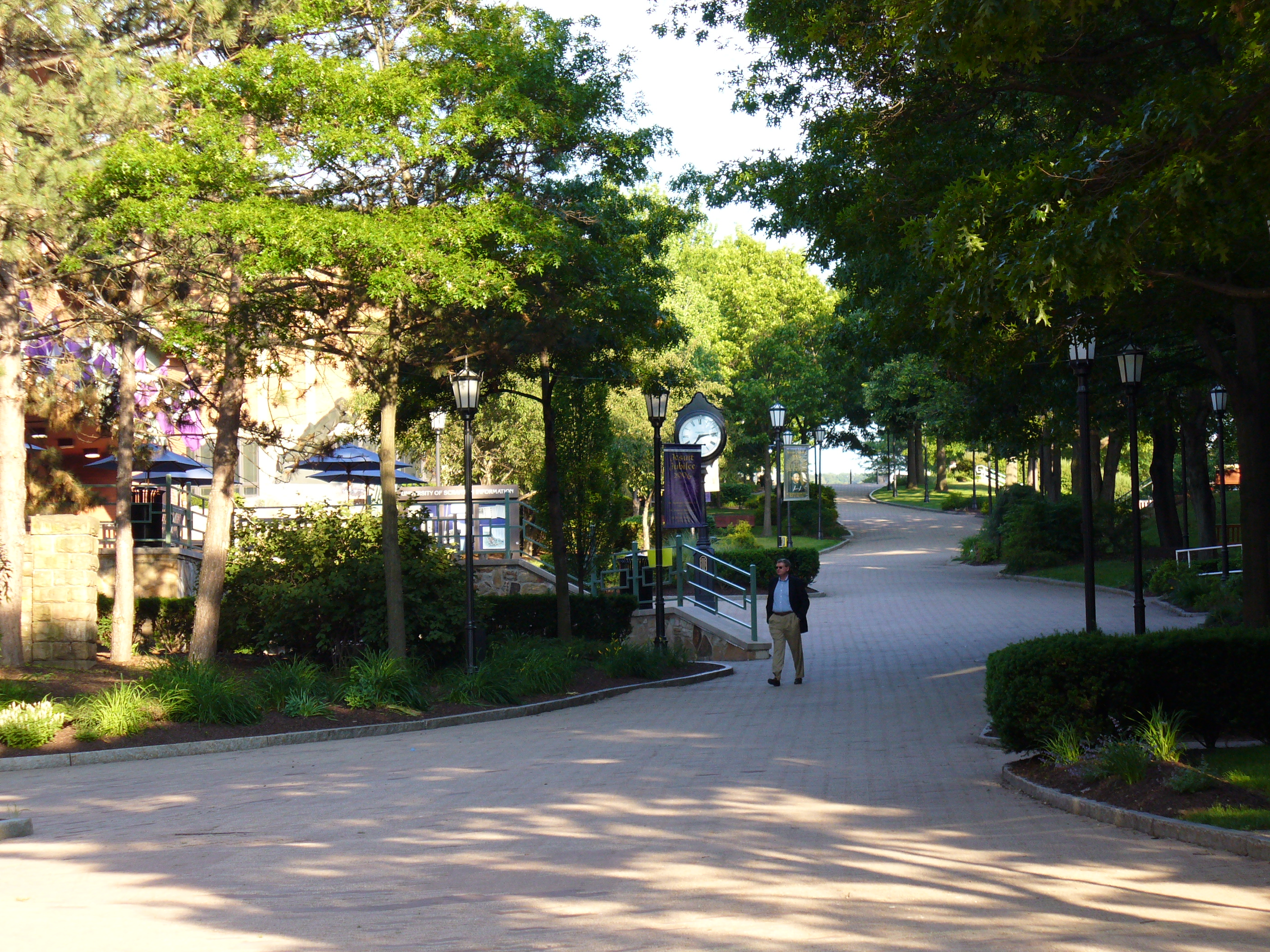
View of The Commons in 2006

For twenty-five years, there had been an effort by the University of Scranton to close the 900 and 1000 blocks of Linden Street which ran through the school’s campus. Through Father Byron's tremendous effort, the improvement project was actualized in 1980. The Commons project proposed by Father Byron was intended to create a more attractive, park-like atmosphere on the campus and to eliminate the safety hazards associated with pedestrian and vehicle traffic. With that new space, the university hoped to create a twenty-foot-wide (6 m) brick walkway, trees, benches, a water fountain, and patio area in addition to developing the area with landscaping.

His plan was met with resistance and objections from some members of the Scranton community. Some, including the Hill Neighborhood Association, expressed concerns about Linden Street’s closing negatively affecting traffic flow, failing to provide significant access to emergency vehicles, and decreasing the availability of parking in the Hill section of the city. Others, however, supported the university's Commons plan, including notable organizations and individuals such as the Scranton Times, the Scranton Fire Chief Robert Ruddy, Scranton City Councilman James Doherty, the board of directors of the Greater Scranton Chamber of Commerce, the Lackawanna County Regional Planning Commission, and ABC local television affiliate WNEP TV-16.

The University Commons proposal was approved by the Scranton City Council on December 20, 1978. In order to accommodate the concerns of some members of the Scranton community, the university replaced the 84 legal parking spaces closed on Linden Street with over 100 legal parking spaces. The university also reduced the size of the traffic triangle at Linden Street and Monroe Avenue by one-third, creating a smooth traffic flow on Monroe to accommodate Linden Street's closing and widened the turning radius on Monroe. The university also pledged 40,000 dollars towards the construction of traffic lights to manage traffic flow. Construction on the project was begun on June 2, 1980, as parts of Linden Street were removed. The project was completed around November 1980 and dedication ceremonies were held in December 1980.

==== The School of Management ====
Before the inception of the School of Management, business and economic programs had been offered in the other three colleges at the university, the College of Arts and Sciences, the Hanley College, and the Graduate School. However, under Byron’s leadership, the School of Management became a separate academic school in 1978. By establishing the School of Management, the university offered a consolidated business program, benefiting both the students and Northeastern Pennsylvania by providing students with the tools and education needed to cultivate administrative talent needed in local businesses, government, non-profit organizations, hospitals, and schools. The School also sponsored a number of seminars and workshops to discuss and resolve economic problems and difficulties in the local business community, such as through the Executive-in-Residence program, where a businessman would come to the university to discuss their business practices.

The School of Management was later renamed the Arthur J. Kania School of Management, or KSOM, in order to recognize the achievements of Mr. Kania as a leader in the business world and a dedicated alumnus of the university. The School was accredited by the AACSB, the International Association for Management Education, in 1996, becoming one of only 13 colleges in the state and 325 in the nation to receive this accreditation. KSOM has continued to expand its programs and majors throughout the years, currently offering programs in accounting, economics, finance, international business, business administration, management, marketing, and operations management in addition to many individualized and specialized majors.

=== President of The Catholic University of America ===
Although he had originally planned to spend the academic year of 1982–1983 on sabbatical working on his books, Father Byron accepted the position of president of The Catholic University of America, where he worked from 1982 until 1992. He was the twelfth president of CUA, installed on Thursday, November 18, 1982. He was the first Jesuit to serve as the President of CUA, which, according to Byron, "signifie[d] cooperation between Jesuits and the Catholic hierarchy" and represented "a warm handshake" between the members of the Society of Jesus and the Catholic Church administration.

=== Later career and death, 1992–2024 ===
Father Byron taught "Social Responsibilities of Business" in the McDonough School of Business at Georgetown University from 1992 until 2000. He also held an appointment as Distinguished Professor of the Practice of Ethics and served as rector of the Georgetown Jesuit Community. From 2000 to 2003, he was pastor of Holy Trinity Catholic Church in Washington, D.C. He served as the interim president of Loyola University New Orleans from 2003 to 2004. Father Byron worked as President of St. Joseph’s Preparatory School from 2006 until 2008. He later worked as a professor of Business and Society at St. Joseph’s University.

Byron died in Philadelphia on April 9, 2024, at the age of 96.

=== Other achievements and notable events ===
On August 27, 1986, the University of Scranton dedicated their new William J. Byron Recreational Complex, which was built to serve the students, particularly the intramural program. Rev. J. A. Panuska, S.J., president of the University of Scranton from 1982 until 1998, stated that naming this facility for Fr. Byron "provides us with a marvelous opportunity to thank him for his leadership at the University and in the region."

Father Byron served as a trustee of Loyola College in Maryland and the University of San Francisco and was a founding director and chairman of Bread for the World, a Christian lobby group arguing for the alleviation of the food crisis throughout the world. Father Byron served on a number of additional committees throughout his career, including as director of Georgetown University, the Economic Development Council of Northeastern Pennsylvania, the United Way of Lackawanna County, Pennsylvania Blue Shield, the Northeastern Bank of Pennsylvania, and Scranton's Community Medical Center. He was also involved in the policy committee of the National Institute of Independent Colleges and Universities. Finally, he served as an editorial consultant for the Paulish Press, Educational Record and Theological Studies.

In 1999, he was the recipient of the Association of Catholic Colleges and Universities' Theodore M. Hesburgh Award for his contributions over the years to the advancement of Catholic higher education. In the same year, Father Byron received the Council of Independent Colleges' Academic Leadership Award.

Father Byron wrote a syndicated bi-weekly column, called "Looking Around," for Catholic News Service. Additionally, he wrote many books over his career.

Byron was also a guest on HBO's Da Ali G Show.

== Books ==
- 1975 – Toward stewardship: An interim ethic of poverty, power, and pollution (Topics in moral argument) - ISBN 0-8091-1865-3
- 1982 – The Causes of World Hunger - ISBN 0-8091-2483-1
- 1989 – Quadrangle Considerations - ISBN 0-8294-0630-1
- 1992 – Take Your Diploma and Run!: Speaking to the Next Generation - ISBN 0-8091-3306-7
- 1995 – Take Courage: Psalms of Support and Encouragement - ISBN 1-55612-751-0
- 1995 – Finding Work Without Losing Heart: Bouncing Back from Mid-Career Job Loss - ISBN 1-55850-481-8
- 1998 – Answers from Within: Spiritual Guidelines for Managing Setbacks in Work and Life - ISBN 0-02-861753-3
- 2000 – Jesuit Saturdays: Sharing the Ignatian Spirit With Lay Colleagues and Friends - ISBN 0-8294-1468-1
- 2003 – The 365 Days of Christmas: Keeping the Wonder of It All Ever Green - ISBN 1-59244-317-6
- 2005 – A Book of Quiet Prayer: For All the Seasons, Stages, Moods, and Circumstances of Life - ISBN 0-8091-4362-3
- 2006 – Power of Principles: Ethics for the New Corporate Culture - ISBN 1-57075-678-3

Academic offices
Preceded by Edmund D. Pellegrino, M.D.	President of CUA; 1982–1992	Succeeded by Brother Patrick Ellis, F.S.C.
Preceded by Dexter L. Hanley, S.J.	President of the University of Scranton; 1975–1982	Succeeded by Joseph A. Panuska, S.J.
