= Scott Pilarz =

American Jesuit priest and academic (1959–2021)

The Reverend Scott Pilarz SJ

24th & 27th President of the University of Scranton
- In office July 1, 2018 – March 10, 2021
- Preceded by: Herb Keller, S.J.
- Succeeded by: Jeff Gingerich, Ph.D.
- In office July 1, 2003 – July 1, 2011
- Preceded by: Joseph M. McShane, S.J.
- Succeeded by: Kevin Quinn, S.J.

23rd President of Marquette University
- In office August 1, 2011 – October 6, 2013
- Preceded by: Robert A. Wild, S.J.
- Succeeded by: Robert A. Wild, S.J.

Personal details
- Born: July 31, 1959
- Died: March 10, 2021 (aged 61) Scranton, Pennsylvania
- Education: Georgetown University; Fordham University; Weston School of Theology; City University of New York
- Profession: Jesuit priest, academic

Scott R. Pilarz SJ (July 31, 1959 – March 10, 2021) was an American Jesuit priest and academic. He served two stints as president of the University of Scranton, first from 2003 to 2011 and again from 2018 until 2021. Pilarz was announced as the successor of Kevin Quinn on March 21, 2017, serving until his death in 2021. Prior to returning to Scranton, Pilarz served as the president of Marquette University and Georgetown Prep.

As an academic, Pilarz was considered an expert on medieval and Renaissance literature as well as Jesuit education.

== Early life and education ==
Scott Pilarz was raised by his parents, Joan and Joseph Pilarz, in Pennsauken Township, New Jersey, a suburb of Camden and Philadelphia. Pilarz has a younger sister, Susan.

Pilarz graduated from Camden Catholic High School in 1977. He received a bachelor's degree in English from Georgetown University in 1981, although he had initially enrolled at Georgetown with the intention of studying politics. Pilarz became interested in the priesthood as an undergraduate student at Georgetown and put together a plan to join the Jesuits during his senior year. Pilarz elaborated on his interest in a 2010 article in the Milwaukee Journal Sentinel, "I remember going into the library, sneaking into the stacks, looking at books about Jesuits. I wouldn't want all my friends to know I was thinking about this. It was kind of an impulse thing at the time...I thought I'd give this a shot and I did...And it felt right all the way along." Pilarz told his family of his decision to join the Jesuits after dinner at their home in Voorhees, New Jersey. He first entered the Society of Jesus in August 1981 and was ordained a Catholic priest within the Jesuit order in 1992.

Pilarz later obtained a master's degree in philosophy from Fordham University. He also attended Weston School of Theology, where he received two additional master's degrees in theology and divinity. Pilarz completed his doctorate in English from the City University of New York (CUNY). His doctoral dissertation, entitled Sacerdotal Self-Fashioning: Priesthood in the Poetry of Robert Southwell, S.J., and John Donne, earned Pilarz the CUNY Alumni Achievement Prize for Dissertation Excellence in 1997.

== Academic career ==
Pilarz was considered to be an expert on medieval and Renaissance literature.

He taught philosophy at the Ss. Peter & Paul Seminary at the University of Ibadan in Ibadan, Nigeria while studying for his master's degrees at the Weston School. Pilarz was also appointed professor of English at Saint Joseph's University in Philadelphia in 1994.

=== Georgetown University ===
Pilarz began teaching at his alma mater, Georgetown University, as an assistant professor of English in 1996. The Georgetown University class of 1999 awarded Pilarz the Edward B. Bunn, S.J., Award for Faculty Excellence for service and teaching. In 2002, he was appointed the interim university chaplain at Georgetown. The appointment of chaplain also gave Pilarz a seat in the cabinet of Georgetown President John J. DeGioia.

During his tenure as a Georgetown faculty member, Pilarz became involved in a movement to revive the university's Jack the Bulldog live mascot called "Bring Back Jack." In 1998, Pilarz collaborated with three students and co-founders of the Hoya Blue fan club – Michael Boyle, Austin Martin, and Kathleen Long – to bring back the bulldog mascot tradition at Georgetown. The Hoya Blue club and the senior class raised $1,500 to purchase Jack, Georgetown's first live mascot since the 1970s. Pilarz personally picked up the new Jack the Bulldog, who was named John P. Carroll then a nine-month-old puppy, upon his arrival at Washington Dulles International Airport on February 16, 1999. Pilarz became Jack's caretaker and roommate at Georgetown. He would walk Jack in the mornings and evenings while student volunteers walked the bulldog mascot during the day while Pilarz was in class or other university functions.

Pilarz was named the President of the University of Scranton in 2003. He brought "John P. Carroll" with him from Georgetown to Scranton when he became President of the University of Scranton in July 2003. "John P. Carroll" was retired in May 2003 so that he could accompany Pilarz to Scranton. Financial donations from Hoya Blue, the Hoya Hoop Club, the Office of the President and alumni allowed for the purchase of Jack's successor bulldog at Georgetown. Jack the Bulldog turned eleven years old in 2010 and lived with Pilarz at the University of Scranton until he became President of Marquette University during the summer of 2011. Pilarz was expected to move with "John P. Carroll" to Milwaukee when he became President of Marquette University in August 2011, but the dog died at the Pilarz's parents home in Voorhees, New Jersey, on September 16, 2011, at the age of 12.

=== President of the University of Scranton ===
Pilarz joined the University of Scranton's board of trustees in 2000. Then-president Joseph McShane notified members of the board in December 2002 that he would leave the University of Scranton to become president of Fordham University. Pilarz was approached by several members of the Scranton board who proposed that he submit his name as a candidate to succeed McShane. Pilarz submitted his name for inclusion in the presidential search after discussing the matter with his Provincial in Baltimore.

The University of Scranton named Pilarz as its 24th president in an announcement on April 23, 2003. He assumed the presidency on July 1, 2003, succeeding outgoing president McShane. Pilarz's inauguration took place on September 26, 2003.

One of the centerpieces of Pilarz's tenure at Scranton has been the development and implementation of a strategic plan called "Pride, Passion, Promise – Shaping Our Jesuit Tradition". The plan has included a $125 million capital campaign overseen by Pilarz which intended to transform the 58-acre (230,000 m^{2}) campus through the construction of new facilities including a new campus center, two new dormitories and a science building. In January 2008, a $35 million campus center, Patrick and Margaret DeNaples Center, was completed. The new 200,000-square-foot (19,000 m^{2}) Loyola Science Center, an $83 million building which is the largest capital and construction project in the history of the University of Scranton, was expected to open during the fall 2011 semester. On September 14, 2010, the university blessed and broke ground for the two new $33 million dormitories, which will contain apartment-style dorms and a fitness center. The dorms, with a combined 189,000 square feet (17,600 m^{2}) of space, will house 400 additional students on campus. In remarks at the groundbreaking ceremony, Pilarz noted that the new dormitories would "add a splendor to this gateway corridor to the city" of Scranton, Pennsylvania. Additionally, The Commons, the main walkway through the campus, has been expanded to include portions of Clay Avenue and Linden Street during Pilarz's tenure, effectively lengthening the campus. The entire $125 million capital campaign, including the Science Center and dormitories currently under construction, was expected to be completed in fall 2011.

Pilarz oversaw launch of a $100 million fundraising campaign, beginning in April 2008. Pilarz has also been credited with boosting the university's student enrollment. Scranton had a total undergraduate and graduate student population of approximately 5,500 people, as of 2010. Scranton has also continued to excel academically under Pilarz. U.S. News & World Report ranked Scranton as number 10 out of 165 universities and colleges in the Northeast United States in August 2010.

In August 2010, Pilarz led a delegation of University of Scranton officials to Rwanda to seek potential partnerships between the university and the Rwandan government. Pilarz announced that the University of Scranton and the Rwandan Ministry of Education would sign a memorandum of understanding to promote faculty and student exchanges. In an interview with The New Times newspaper, Pilarz stated, "Due to the history of Rwanda and its tremendous improvement in human rights promotion and economic development, we are seeking to partner with the Government of Rwanda to integrate an examination of the country into the life of the university."

Pilarz initiated the creation of a support group for gays and lesbians at the University of Scranton called "Inclusion Initiative", explaining "There is no room for prejudice on a Catholic campus."

Throughout his tenure at Scranton, Pilarz had continued to teach at least one course each semester, focusing on a diverse range of subjects, including 16th-century British literature, Renaissance poetry and a course called "Playing God: Theatrical Expression of Divinity."

In 2010, author Ronald M. Shapiro profiled Pilarz as one of thirty-eight individuals included in his book, "Dare to Prepare: How to Win Before You Begin," which became a New York Times bestseller. Shapiro cited Pilarz's work at the University of Scranton and his fundraising skills for his inclusion in the book.

=== President of Marquette University ===
Pilarz was elected to the board of trustees of Marquette University in Milwaukee in September 2009. In March 2010, Pilarz attended his first meeting as a board member. Coincidentally, Marquette President, Robert A. Wild, announced his intention to retire in 2011 after fifteen years as president of the university during the same month. A presidential selection committee, headed by Mary Ellen Stanek, began searching for Wild's successor.

On Tuesday, August 31, 2010, the Marquette Board of Trustees unanimously selected Pilarz as Marquette University's 23rd President and successor to Wild. Pilarz served as the President of the University of Scranton until he was succeeded by Rev. Kevin P. Quinn, S.J. on July 1, 2011. He officially became president of Marquette University on August 1, 2011.

Pilarz notified the Marquette University Board of Trustees on September 20, 2013, of his decision to resign as university president at the end of the fall semester 2013; the semester ended on December 14, 2013. After 10 years serving in the capacity of a university president, Pilarz planned to pursue new apostolic work as a Jesuit priest.

=== Later life ===
Pilarz accepted his appointment to become President of Georgetown Preparatory School in North Bethesda Maryland, starting effectively on July 1, 2014.

The University of Scranton announced on March 21, 2017, that Pilarz would succeed Quinn as the 26th President of the university. He was subsequently inaugurated on July 1, 2018. He announced one month later on August 29 that he had been diagnosed earlier that year with amyotrophic lateral sclerosis (ALS).

Pilarz died on March 10, 2021, in Scranton. He was 61, and suffered from complications related to ALS.

== Professional achievements ==
=== Board memberships ===
Pilarz was previously a member of the State Ethics Commission for the Commonwealth of Pennsylvania from 2005 until 2008. He served as the representative of the Association of Jesuit Colleges and Universities (AJCU) to the board of directors of the American Council on Education (ACE) from 2005 until 2008.

Pilarz has been a member of the University of Scranton board of trustees since 2000 and Marquette University's board of trustees since 2009. He was the president of the board of Camden Catholic High School in New Jersey. He was also a board member of Boston College, Scranton Preparatory School, Scranton Tomorrow and the United Nations of Northeastern Pennsylvania as of 2010.

=== Awards ===
Most recently, Pilarz was awarded an honorary degree from King's College in Wilkes-Barre, Pennsylvania, in 2010. He was the recipient of Georgetown University's John Carroll Award in 2009, the highest honor awarded from the Georgetown University Alumni Association. He has also been awarded the Lackawanna Bar Association Chief Justice Michael J. Eagan Award for Dedicated Service and the Slovak Republic St. Elizabeth University of Health and Social Sciences Great Medal of St. Elizabeth Award.

=== Membership ===
Pilarz was a member of numerous professional, academic and cultural organizations including the Polish Institute of Arts and Sciences of America, the Shakespeare Association of America, the Academy of American Poets, the Modern Language Association, the John Donne Society and The Renaissance Society of America.

== See also ==
Academic offices
Preceded by Joseph M. McShane, S.J.	President of the University of Scranton; 2003–2011	Succeeded by Kevin Quinn, S.J.
Preceded by Robert A. Wild, S.J.	President of Marquette University; 2011–2013	Succeeded by Robert A. Wild, S.J.
Preceded by Herb Keller, S.J.	President of the University of Scranton; 2018–2021	Succeeded by Jeff Gingerich, Ph.D. as Acting president
