= Patrick Ellis (educator) =

Br. Patrick Ellis FSC (Baltimore, November 17, 1928 – Lincroft, February 21, 2013) was an American member of the Institute of the Brothers of the Christian Schools, also known as the De La Salle Christian Brothers. He was the 13th president of The Catholic University of America (CUA) in Washington, D.C., from 1992 to 1998 and President of La Salle University in Philadelphia, Pennsylvania, from 1977 to 1992.

== Early life ==
He was born Harry James Ellis Jr. in Baltimore, Maryland, and entered the novitiate of the brothers in 1945, being given the religious name of Felician Patrick. He graduated in 1946 from Calvert Hall College High School and joined the Brothers of the Christian Schools. He then attended the Catholic University of America, where he was granted a bachelor's degree in literature in 1951. Following his graduation, he was sent on his first teaching assignment at West Philadelphia Catholic High School for nine years.

== Educational career ==
In 1960, Ellis joined the faculty at La Salle College in Philadelphia as a member of the English Department. He was sent to serve as the principal of La Salle-Immaculata High School in Miami, which focused on educating the children of refugees from post-revolutionary Cuba until 1964, when he returned to La Salle, where he was named president in 1977.

During his tenure as La Salle president, Ellis doubled the size of the campus and oversaw the building of new residence halls and a new modernized library. While president he continued to teach English literature courses as he had during his 30 years as a professor at La Salle.

In 1992 he was offered the position of President of The Catholic University of America. He served in this office until 1998. The Catholic University of America has named the Brother Patrick Ellis Chair in Education in his honor.

== Last years ==
Following his departure from the presidency, Ellis spent five years working in fundraising for his Province. He then retired to their nursing home in Lincroft, New Jersey, where he died from acute leukemia. He was buried at the Brothers' cemetery near Baltimore, Maryland.

Academic offices
Preceded by Daniel Burke	President of La Salle University; 1977–1992	Succeeded by Joseph Burke
Preceded by William J. Byron	President of the Catholic University of America; 1992–1998	Succeeded by David M. O'Connell
