= J. Eugene Gallery =

American Jesuit educator and sociologist

The Reverend J. Eugene Gallery

13th President of the University of Scranton
- In office 1947–1953
- Preceded by: W. Coleman Nevils
- Succeeded by: John J. Long

Personal details
- Born: 1898 Baltimore, Maryland, U.S.
- Died: July 28, 1960 (aged 61–62) Washington, D.C., U.S.
- Education: Georgetown University (BA, MA, JD)

Orders
- Ordination: 1939

Joseph Eugene Gallery (1898 – July 28, 1960) was an American Catholic priest and Jesuit. He studied sociology at Georgetown University, before serving in the U.S. Army during World War I. Upon his return, he graduated, and entered business in Washington, D.C. He then entered the Society of Jesus in 1931, and was later ordained a priest. He became a professor of sociology at the University of Scranton, and also worked in child welfare and in arbitrating industrial disputes. In 1947, Gallery became the president of the University of Scranton. During his presidency, the university's graduate school was established. His term came to and end in 1953, and he continued to teach sociology at Saint Joseph's College in Philadelphia.

== Early life ==
Joseph Eugene Gallery was born in Baltimore, Maryland, in 1898. He studied at Gonzaga College High School, and then Georgetown University, where his studies were interrupted by his service in World War I as a second lieutenant in the United States Army. He graduated from Georgetown in 1919, with a Bachelor of Arts in sociology. The following year, he received his master's degree in sociology from Georgetown. From 1919 to 1920, he also taught public speaking at Gonzaga College in Washington, D.C.

Upon his graduation, Gallery worked in business in the Washington, D.C., area for a decade, and became active in the Knights of Columbus, eventually becoming district master. He entered the Society of Jesus in 1931, and was ordained a Catholic priest in 1939. He then earned a Juris Doctor degree from Georgetown Law School in 1948.

== Academic career ==
Gallery became involved in the child welfare agencies of New York City. He then transferred to the University of Scranton, becoming one of the initial members of the university's Jesuit community in 1942. He became a professor of sociology at the university, and served as the chairman of the social studies department. He also was the director and one of the founders of the university's Institute of Industrial Relations, which had branches in Hazelton, Shenandoah, and Scranton. Given his work in the industrial relations field, he was frequently appointed an arbitrator in industrial disputes. He continued to remain involved in child welfare, working with local agencies, and being appointed by two governors of Pennsylvania as the chair of commission on child welfare.

In 1947, Gallery was appointed president of the University of Scranton, succeeding W. Coleman Nevils. Soon after assuming the office, he purchased three surplus Navy barracks, and had them erected on the campus in the fall of 1947, to accommodate the rapid increase in enrollment due to the G.I. Bill. The university's graduate school was established in 1950, awarding degrees in education, business administration, and chemistry. His presidency came to an end in 1953.

== Later years ==
Gallery then became a professor of sociology at Loyola College in Maryland in 1953, and then transferred to Saint Joseph's College in 1958 as treasurer. He died of cancer on July 28, 1960, at Georgetown University Hospital in Washington, D.C.

Academic offices
Preceded by W. Coleman Nevils	13th President of the University of Scranton; 1947–1953	Succeeded by John J. Long
