= Patrick and Margaret DeNaples Center =

The Patrick and Margaret DeNaples Center is The University of Scranton's campus center. On January 31, 2006, the university announced plans for the DeNaples Center, a new $30,000,000 campus center that would replace Gunster Memorial Student Center and mark the university's most ambitious project in its 118-year history. In the four decades since Gunster had been constructed in 1960, the University of Scranton, as University President Father Pilarz said, “has evolved into a broadly regional, comprehensive institution with students coming from more than 30 states and more than 35 countries," and thus “has simply outgrown the 77,000 square foot Gunster Center, which was built for a time when only 228 of our total student enrollment of 2,300 lived on campus.”

The DeNaples Center is a four-story building located on the 900 block of Mulberry Street in Scranton, Pennsylvania. The first floor of the building includes a grand lobby, the campus bookstore, the student mail center, commuter lockers, a Provisions on Demand (P.O.D.) convenience and the DeNaples Food Court, a retail dining option with seating for 250, which includes Starbucks Coffee, Chick-Fil-A, and Quizno's among other options. The second floor offers a fireplace lounge, offices for Student Affairs, University Ministries and the Student Forum. The Student Forum contains a computer lab for students to use, as well as student space with couches and tables. The Student Forum is home to the Center for Student Engagement, including the offices for the University of Scranton Programming Board (USPB), the Aquinas newspaper, the Windhover yearbook, the Jane Kopas Women's Center, the Multicultural Center, Student Government, and Community Outreach. The third floor serves as the primary dining space in the building and has seating for 800. Run by ARAMARK's “Fresh Food Company,” the third floor dining hall contains several different stations, including Southern Kitchen, a fresh produce market, a pasta station, a brick oven, Mediterranean deli, Brazilian grill, round grill and charbroiler, where all meals are made fresh to order. The fourth floor includes a subdividable 7,000 sq. ft. ballroom with dinner seating for 425 and lecture seating for more than 700 and three multipurpose meeting rooms as well as the Ann and Leo Moscovitz Theater with 260 fixed seats which boasts high-definition video, surround sound and comfortable, oversized theater seating. On September 13, 2009, the fourth floor ballroom was dedicated in honor of Rev. Bernard R. McIllhenny, S.J., who served as headmaster at Scranton Prep from 1958 to 1966 and dean of admissions at the university from 1966 to 1997.

The DeNaples Center was the first building on campus designed and constructed to achieve the LEED certification as part of the university's Sustainability initiatives, which it received in February 2009. LEED stands for Leadership in Energy and Environmental Design, a cutting-edge system for certifying design, construction and operations of “green” buildings, coordinated by the U.S. Green Building Council. Some environmentally friendly highlights of the DeNaples Center include reduced light pollution, a drip irrigation system, and optimized energy performance. The building also features products with recycled content, daylight harvesting, occupancy sensors for lighting control, water-saving fixtures, and a kitchen ventilation system that monitors heat and smoke and will adjust ventilation requirements according to need and not merely according to building occupancy schedule.

The DeNaples Center is named in honor of the late Patrick and Margaret DeNaples, the parents of Louis DeNaples Sr., a local business owner, active community volunteer and philanthropist, former University board member, and reputed organized crime associate. The DeNaples Center was dedicated in February 2008. Upon the completion and opening of the DeNaples Center, the Gunster Memorial Student Center was demolished and was replaced by the Dionne Green, a large green space located directly in front of the DeNaples Center.
