= Robert A. Wild =

Robert Anthony Wild, SJ (born March 30, 1940) is an American Catholic priest who served as interim president of Marquette University from 2013 to 2014, a return to the administration after serving as president from 1996 to 2011. He has been a member of the Society of Jesus since 1957.

== Background, education and career ==
He earned a master's degree in classical language from Loyola University Chicago and a doctorate of religion from Harvard University. From 1964 to 1967, Wild taught Latin, Greek, and speech and debate at St. Xavier High School in Cincinnati, Ohio. He has also taught at Harvard University, Loyola University Chicago, the Pontifical Biblical Institute in Rome, and Marquette University.

Wild was interim president of Marquette University from October, 2013, through August, 2014.
