= Robert J. Henle =

American Jesuit philosopher and academic administrator

The Reverend Robert J. Henle SJ
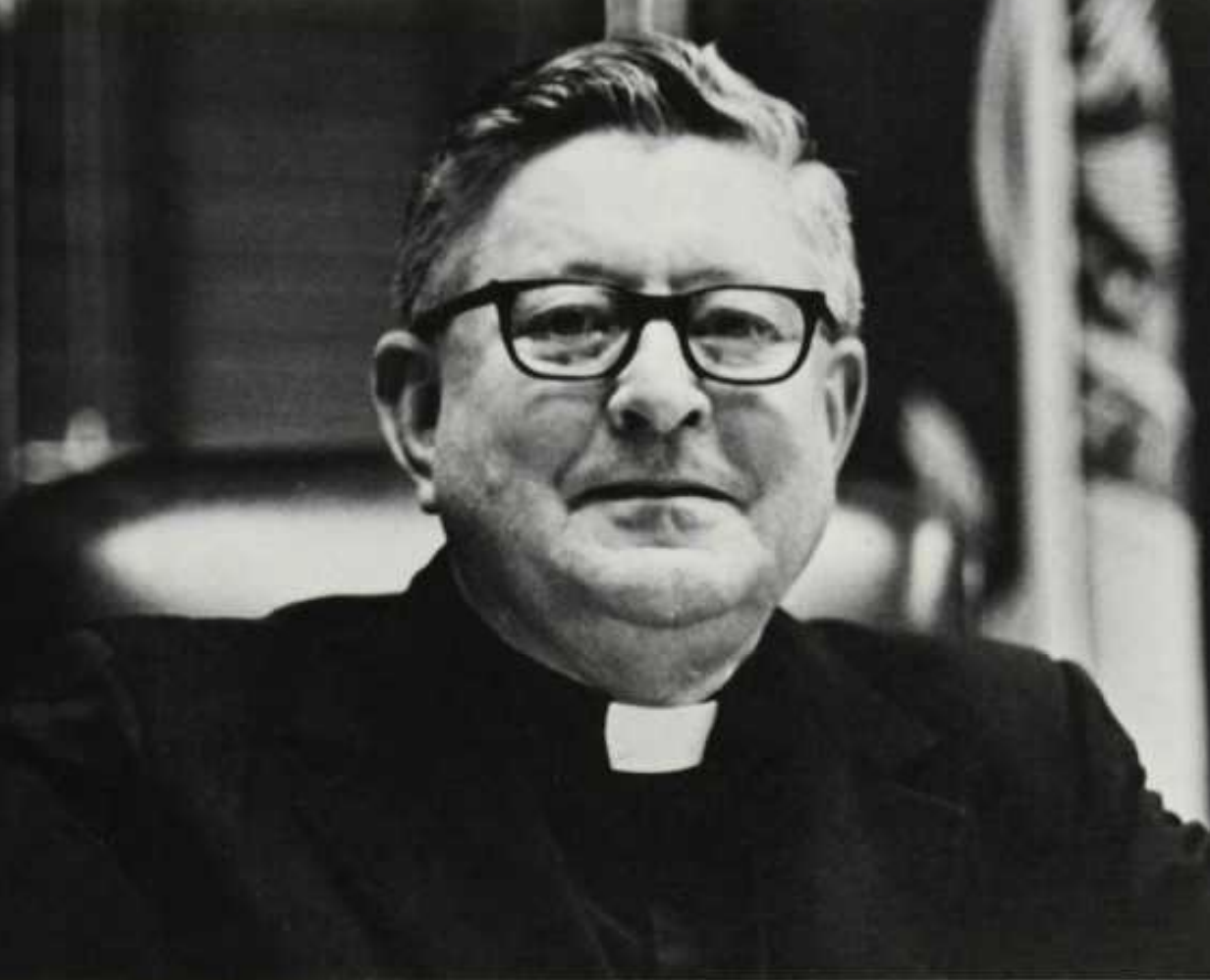
- Henle in 1972

45th President of Georgetown University
- In office 1969–1976
- Preceded by: Gerard J. Campbell
- Succeeded by: Timothy S. Healy

Personal details
- Born: September 12, 1909 Muscatine, Iowa, U.S.
- Died: January 20, 2000 (aged 90) St. Louis, Missouri, U.S.
- Education: Saint Louis University (BA, MA, PhL, STL); University of Toronto (PhD)

Orders
- Ordination: 1940

Philosophical work
- Era: 20th-century philosophy
- School: Thomism, medieval philosophy
- Main interests: Existentialism, ethics, philosophy of law

Robert John Henle SJ (September 12, 1909 – January 20, 2000) was an American Catholic priest, Jesuit, and philosopher who was the president of Georgetown University from 1969 to 1976.

Born in Iowa, Henle entered the Society of Jesus in 1927. He taught high school classics and published a series of instructional books on Latin, one of which became widely used. He then became a professor at Saint Louis University and was known as one of the leaders of the revival of Thomistic philosophy and theology. He also served as a dean and vice president for nearly 20 years. In this latter capacity, he oversaw Saint Louis University's growing independence from, but continuing affiliation with, the Jesuit order.

In 1969, Henle was named the president of Georgetown University. He presided over an era of rapid growth and a diversifying student body. The student population grew and Henle stabilized the university's finances. Women were admitted for the first time to Georgetown College, the last all-male school at the university, while the number of black students increased. He also hired John Thompson, one of the first black coaches of a major collegiate basketball team, who later led the team to an NCAA championship in 1984.

Henle's tenure also encompassed a highly fractious period of student unrest during the Vietnam War. Georgetown maintained a policy of official neutrality on contentious social and political issues, while often appeasing student demands, over the protest of faculty. In 1971, the Washington Metropolitan Police fired tear gas from helicopters onto non-student protesters who entered the campus. After the end of his presidency in 1976, Henle returned to Saint Louis University, where he taught philosophy for the remainder of his career.

== Early life ==
Robert John Henle was born on September 12, 1909, in Muscatine, Iowa. He attended St. Mathias School in Muscatine, before moving with his family to Los Angeles, California, where he graduated from Loyola High School. Henle then enrolled at Creighton University in 1926, and entered the Society of Jesus the following year in Florissant, Missouri. He completed his undergraduate work at Saint Louis University, receiving his Bachelor of Arts in 1931. He continued his education at Saint Louis University, earning a Master of Arts in 1932 and a Licentiate of Philosophy in 1935.

== Saint Louis University ==
After completing his licentiate, Henle began teaching classics at St. Louis University High School in 1935. After two years, he left to teach education at Campion Summer School in Prairie du Chien, Wisconsin, where he remained until 1941. During this time, he published a series of instructional books on Latin, one of which became one of the most widely used Latin grammar books in education. Henle was ordained a priest in 1940, and earned a Licentiate of Sacred Theology the following year from St. Mary's College in Kansas, the Jesuit theological school of Saint Louis University. From 1941 to 1942, he studied at the St. Stanislaus Novitiate in Cleveland, Ohio, and then at the University of Toronto from 1942 to 1945. Beginning in 1943, he took intermittent leave of the University of Toronto to serve as an instructor in philosophy and dean of the School of Philosophy and Science at Saint Louis University. He also became the editor of The Modern Schoolman in 1945, holding this position until 1950.

Henle became an assistant professor of philosophy at Saint Louis University in 1947, and simultaneously became the dean of the Graduate School in 1950. He served as the chairman of the American Catholic Philosophical Association's committee on research from 1949 to 1950, and as the president of the Missouri State Philosophical Association from 1950 to 1951; he was also a member of the American Philosophical Society. Henle returned to the University of Toronto to earn his Doctor of Philosophy in philosophy in 1954, where he had Jacques Maritain and Ètienne Gilson as professors.

After earning his doctorate, he resumed teaching at Saint Louis University, and was promoted to full professor in 1958. As a philosopher, Henle became known as a leading figure in the revival of Thomistic philosophy and theology, and elucidated Aquinas' relationship to Platonism and neo-Platonism. The author of more than 200 articles and many books, he was elected a member of the American Academy of Arts and Sciences.

That year, Henle also became the academic vice president of the university, a position he would hold for the next 11 years. He was regarded as a capable administrator and talented academic at Saint Louis University, while some students viewed him as inaccessible. As vice president, he oversaw the relocation of St. Mary's College from St. Marys, Kansas, to the campus of Saint Louis University in 1967. The university sought to improve the academic standards of the seminary by moving it from the countryside to an urban area, where it could become integrated into the university and take advantage of its greater resources. Along with the move, the school was transformed from a seminary exclusively for Jesuits into a graduate-level school of divinity that admitted students of any religious denomination.

Henle also worked with the university's president, Paul C. Reinert, to shift Saint Louis University away from governance exclusively by Jesuits. While the board of trustees was transformed from one composed of senior Jesuit administrators to one of laymen and Jesuits unaffiliated with the university, Henle proposed that the university publicly reformulate the relationship between the Jesuits and the university. Rather than describing the university as "owned by" the Jesuits, he proposed that the Jesuits "supported" or "sponsored" the university. He also recommended that the Jesuit community sever its dependence on the university.

Henle was a promoter of the humanities, at a time when federal funding of universities was increasingly being allocated for scientific and technical fields. In 1957, he addressed the International Congress of Philosophy, arguing that the modern priority of philosophy should be to encourage the use of "reflective intelligence," and urging philosophers to not excessively rely on empirical fields, such as psychology and psychiatry.

== Georgetown University ==
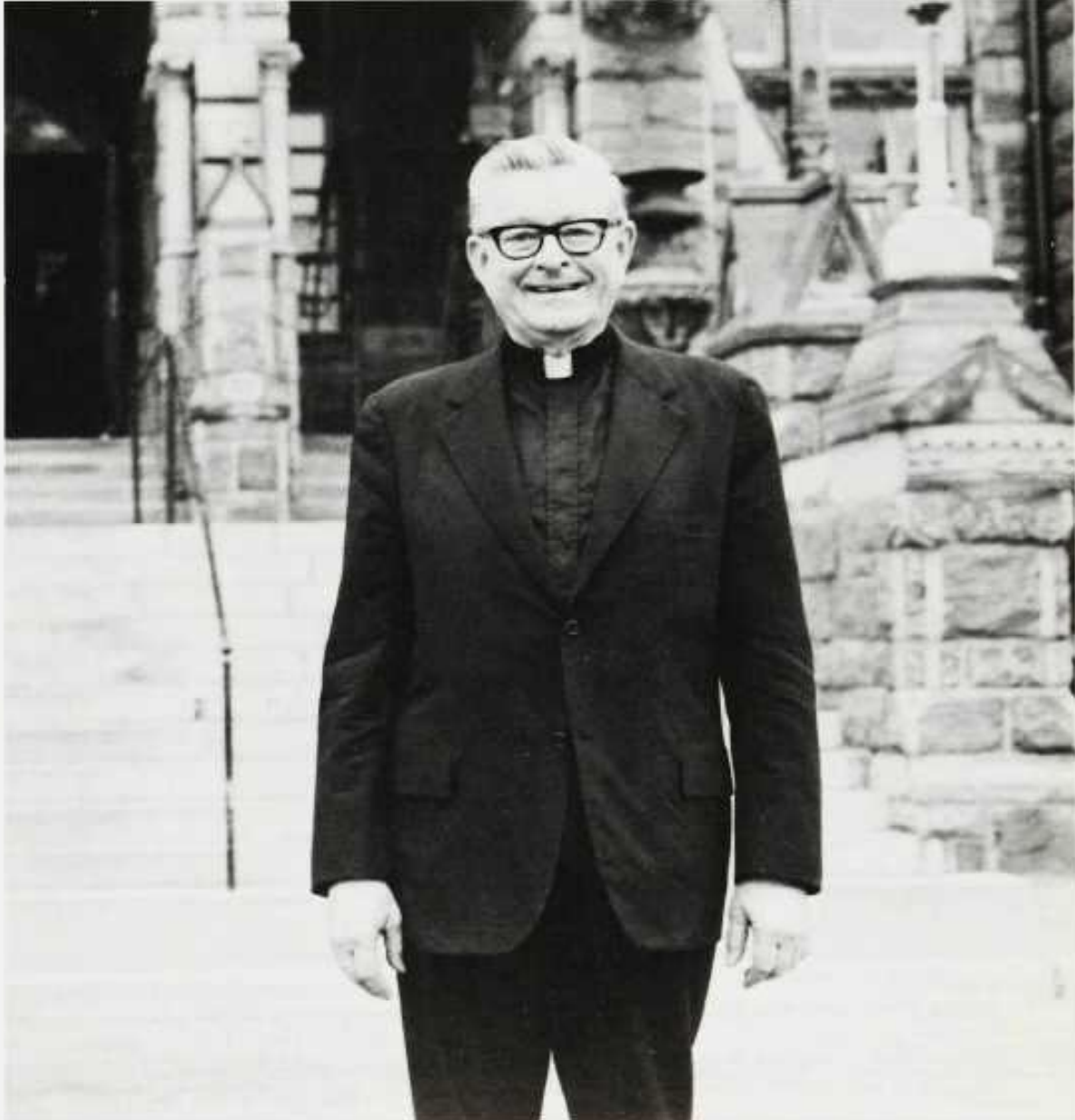
Henle in front of Healy Hall in 1976

Henle was appointed the president of Georgetown University on January 6, 1969, succeeding Gerard Campbell. He was the first president to be selected by a search committee, rather than by the Jesuit superiors, and was the first since Louis William Valentine Dubourg to have no prior connection to Georgetown. Henle was chosen in part because of his experience dealing with politicians as vice president of Saint Louis University; the chairman of Georgetown's presidential search committee, Edwin A. Quain, desired someone who would become active in Washington, D.C.'s social and political circles.

=== Stabilization of finances ===
Henle's most immediate project was to bring the university's budget under control. Indeed, he accepted the position only after being allowed to examine the school's finances, and concluding that they could be meaningfully reformed. He replaced the senior financial officers, and successfully reduced the budget, mainly by dramatically increasing enrollment in the early 1970s. This is largely the result of a decision to rely on tuition for revenue. During this time, the demographics of the student body changed as well, as the university began actively recruiting students outside the Northeastern United States and outside of Jesuit and Catholic high schools. The university also implemented affirmative action programs for women and racial minorities. Plans to admit women to Georgetown College, the last all-male school at the university, were put into place in 1968, and the first female students entered the college in 1969. By 1972, the number of female undergraduate students at Georgetown was greater than the number of male students for the first time in the university's history. Henle also made a concerted effort to increase the admission and retention of black students.

Upon entering office, one of Henle's concerns was the lack of long-term planning for the university's expansion and development. Therefore, he created the Office of Institutional Research, to disseminate information about university planning. An architectural master plan was also drawn up that called for expansive construction of classroom and housing accommodations on campus, to support a growing student population. Of this plan, the portion that came to fruition was the construction of parking garages, which resulted in a marked reduction in the number of green spaces on campus. Georgetown faced a significant shortage of on-campus housing, with the vast majority of students living off-campus. Henle purchased Alban Towers to alleviate this shortage, and began construction on a new housing village, which was completed in 1976, after his presidency, and named the Henle Student Village.

=== Faculty and student affairs ===
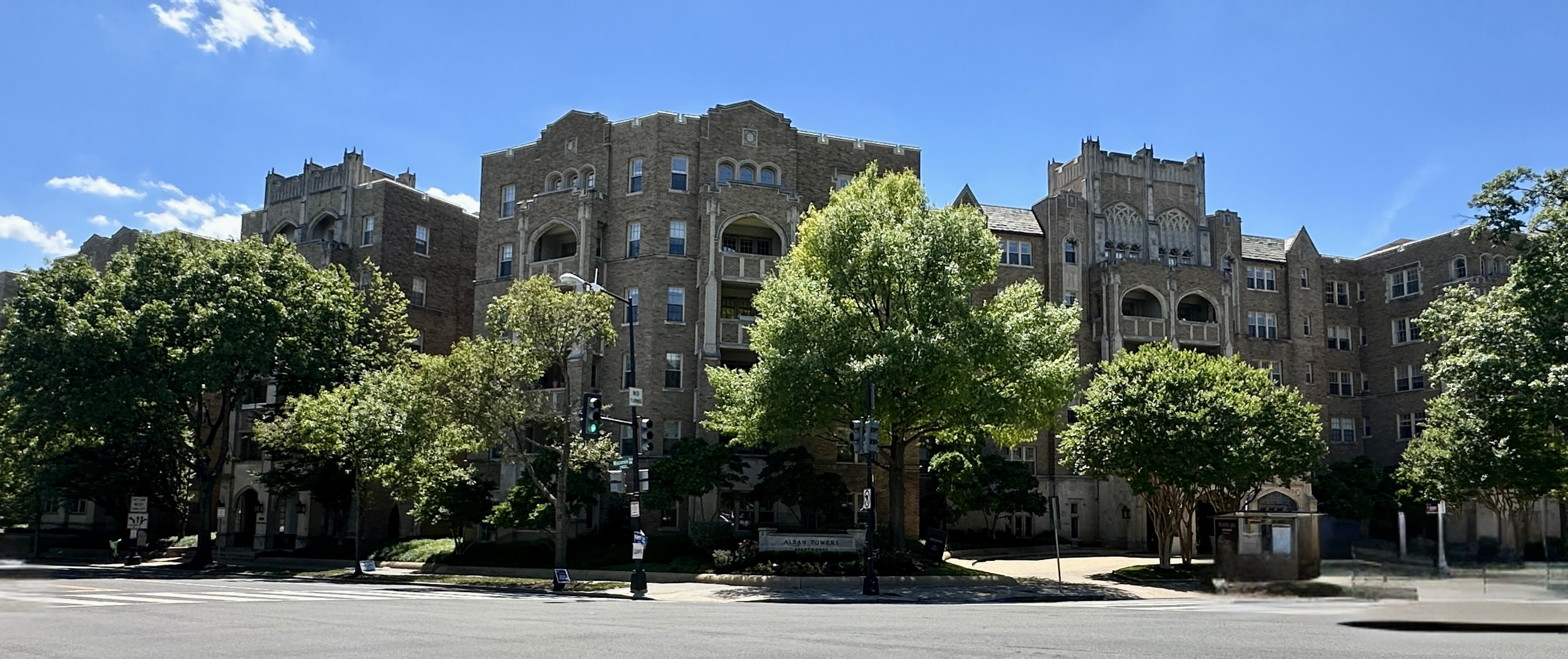
Henle purchased Alban Towers to alleviate a shortage of student housing.

Henle also sought to reform the structure of the faculty. With only one endowed chair (in pharmacology) existing at the time he took office, Henle sought increase the number of endowed chairs to raise the quality of the faculty. He also capped the percentage of faculty who could receive tenure. The Woodstock Theological Center became affiliated with Georgetown and relocated to the university's campus in 1974. Plans to establish a Center for Contemporary Arab Studies were developed, and Henle solicited funds from a wide array of Arab countries, including those with whom the United States did not have diplomatic relations; the center opened in 1975, after Henle's presidency. Following the recommendation of a search committee, Henle decided to hire John Thompson as the coach of the Georgetown Hoyas men's basketball team. One of the first black coaches of a major collegiate basketball team, Thompson went on to lead the team to become the 1984 NCAA Champions.

Henle's presidency encompassed an era of student protests of the Vietnam War. He attempted to defuse tensions by declaring a university policy of neutrality on any controversial issue. Conflict came to a head in 1970, following President Richard Nixon's announcement of the invasion of Cambodia and the subsequent killing of four students at Kent State University. With student anger increasing, a widespread strike of classes, and the threat of violence on campus becoming apparent, Henle announced on May 7 that classes would be suspended for the rest of the semester. The faculty denounced working in an environment of intimidation by students and condemned what they viewed as a threat to the very purpose of a university—detached, objective learning. The faculty senate considered a resolution that would require any future suspension of the academic calendar to be approved by two-thirds of the faculty, but Henle vetoed this resolution before it could be brought to a vote.

Georgetown's campus was host to another conflict in May 1971, when several thousand protesters (who were not affiliated with Georgetown) sought refuge on the university's campus after being pushed back by police for trying to shut down the Key Bridge and other major arteries of Washington, D.C. At the time, Henle was in Rome, and the campus was under the direction of the vice president, James Kelly. Kelly allowed the protesters to remain on campus, and provided them with food. Without the university's permission, the Metropolitan Police then fired tear gas from helicopters onto the protesters, as well as Georgetown students who were walking to their final exams, causing the exams to be postponed. The campus atmosphere began to change in the 1972–1973 academic year, as protests died down, and student attention became less motivated by national politics. Rather than focus on politics, the student government increasingly became a service provider to students, and created The Students of Georgetown, Incorporated (The Corp) in March 1972.

That year, Henle became involved in an administrative dispute with a vice president and the board of directors. He hired Edmund Ryan as vice president for educational affairs, effectively the chief academic officer, outside of the formal procedure and without the consent of the board. Soon thereafter, Henle and Ryan had a falling out, in which Henle accused Ryan of trying to force him into retirement so that Ryan could become president. Ryan became convinced that Henle was forming a coalition to undermine him, and that Henle was bugging his office; Ryan refused to meet in the president's office, and insisted that they meet in his room in the Jesuit community. Eventually, Henle fired Ryan, who would be admitted to the psychiatric ward of Saint Vincent's Hospital in New York City two months later, but later became the president of Seattle University. Unaware of its basis, the faculty senate and student body protested the firing. As a result, the board became increasingly scrutinizing of Henle, who by this time had also become an alcoholic. While commending his leadership, the board ultimately decided that 1976 would be his final year as president. Henle submitted his resignation as president of Georgetown on June 30, 1976.

== Later years ==
Following his presidency of Georgetown, Henle returned to Saint Louis University as the McDonnell Professor of Justice in American Society, as which he taught in the philosophy department and law school. He held this appointment until his retirement in 1982. During this time, he wrote on Thomistic epistemology, ethics, and legal theory.

Henle died on January 20, 2000, at the Jesuit infirmary residence in St. Louis, Missouri. The Robert J. Henle Chair of Philosophy was established in his honor at Saint Louis University, and its inaugural holder, Eleonore Stump, founded the Robert J. Henle Conference in 1993, which convenes scholars to discuss matters of philosophy.

Academic offices
Preceded by —	Dean of the Saint Louis University School of Philosophy and Science; 1943—1950	Succeeded by —
Preceded by —	Dean of the Saint Louis University Graduate School; 1950—1969	Succeeded by —
Preceded by Gerard J. Campbell	45th President of Georgetown University; 1969—1974	Succeeded by Timothy S. Healy
