= Francis X. Talbot =

American Jesuit editor and academic administrator

The Reverend Francis X. Talbot SJ

20th President of Loyola College in Maryland
- In office 1947–1950
- Preceded by: Edward B. Bunn
- Succeeded by: Thomas Murray

Personal details
- Born: January 25, 1889 Philadelphia, Pennsylvania, U.S.
- Died: December 3, 1953 (aged 64) Washington, D.C., U.S.
- Resting place: Jesuit Community Cemetery
- Education: St. Andrew-on-Hudson; Woodstock College (MA); Pontifical Gregorian University (PhD)

Orders
- Ordination: June 29, 1921 by Owen Corrigan

Francis Xavier Talbot SJ (January 25, 1889 – December 3, 1953) was an American Catholic priest and Jesuit who was active in Catholic literary and publishing circles, and became the President of Loyola College in Maryland. Born in Philadelphia, he entered the Society of Jesus in 1906, and was educated at St. Andrew-on-Hudson and Woodstock College. He taught for several years in New York City and at Boston College, before entering publishing as the literary editor of America magazine in 1923, of which he became the editor-in-chief in 1936. While in this role, he was also active in founding and editing several academic journals, including Thought, and establishing various Catholic literary societies and book clubs. During World War II, he was chaplain to a Catholic organization that previewed movies for the National Legion of Decency. He also supported Franco's rule in Spain because of its support of Catholicism and opposition to communism; he also supported the US war effort. He was described as one of the early leaders of the revival of Catholic literature in the United States.

In 1947, Talbot was named the President of Loyola College in Maryland. He held the office for three years and then was briefly an archivist at Georgetown University before becoming a priest and historian of St. Aloysius Church. He was then assigned to Holy Trinity Church in Georgetown, where he died.

== Early life ==
Francis Xavier Talbot was born on January 25, 1889, in Philadelphia, Pennsylvania, to parents Patrick Talbot and Bridget Talbot née Peyton. He was one of seven children and attended St. Edward's Parish School, and then St. Joseph's Preparatory School. He lived in Philadelphia until the age of seventeen, when he entered the Society of Jesus on August 15, 1906, proceeding to the Jesuit novitiate of St. Andrew-on-Hudson in Poughkeepsie, New York. After two years, he went to Woodstock College in Maryland for three years, where he received a Master of Arts in philosophy in 1913.

He then taught English at Loyola School in New York City from 1913 to 1916 and religion at Boston College from 1917 to 1918, before returning to Woodstock College to study theology for four years. While there, he was ordained a priest by Owen Corrigan, the Auxiliary Bishop of Baltimore, on June 29, 1921. That year, he took his final vows, and completed his tertianship in 1923. He later received at Doctor of Philosophy from the Pontifical Gregorian University in Rome.

== Literary career ==
Talbot spent much of his life working in Catholic literary circles and was described as one of the early leaders of the revival of Catholic literature in the United States. He publicly defended the quality of Catholic intellectual life against criticisms and called for the improvement of the teaching of Catholic fiction literature in Catholic universities.

He became the literary editor of America magazine in 1923 after the death of Walter Dwight. In that role, he held two "literary plebiscites" to draw public attention to Catholic authors and books. He became a trustee of the American Catholic Historical Society in 1925. Talbot also became the first editor of the academic journal Thought in 1926. He additionally played a key role in the establishment of Theological Studies, the official theology journal of the Society of Jesus. In 1928, he founded the Catholic Book Club to give readers a list of notable Catholic books. He formed the Catholic Poetry Society of America in 1930, whose goal was to bring together all the Catholic poets in the United States, and served as its chaplain from 1934 to 1936. He was also active in the founding of the Spiritual Book Associates in 1932 and served as chairman of its editorial committee. He then assisted in the founding of the Pro Parvulis Society, whose focus was on children's books.

Talbot contributed to the Encyclopædia Britannica, including generally reviewing it to reduce anti-Catholic bias, and the 1936 edition contained two articles written by him. He served as chaplain to the National Motion Picture Bureau of the International Federation of Catholic Alumnae for twelve years, which previewed movies for the National Legion of Decency. He was also chaplain to the Yorkville Council of the Knights of Columbus. Talbot also contributed to foundation of the Catholic Theatre Conference and the Catholic Library Association. While in Canada, he worked to persuade the Quebec authorities to return the Dionne quintuplets, the world's first surviving quintuplets, to their parents.

In 1936, he was selected to succeed Wilfrid Parsons as editor-in-chief of America, and became the ex officio editor-in-chief of the journal Catholic Mind as well. Due to its support of Catholicism and rejection of modernism and communism, Talbot supported Francoist Spain. Talbot organized the America Spanish Relief Fund to aid victims of the Spanish Civil War. He also strongly supported the United States during World War I and World War II. His tenure as head of America came to an end in 1944. In recognition of his work in publishing, students of New York City Catholic high schools created a book club in 1942 called the Talbot Club.

== Academic career ==
During World War II, Talbot became an auxiliary chaplain at Fort Myer in Arlington, Virginia. Upon leaving America, he moved to Georgetown University, where he became the regional director of the Institute of Social Order and the university's assistant archivist, where he remained until 1947.

Talbot was appointed the President of Loyola College in Maryland on July 26, 1947, by the Jesuit Superior General, succeeding Edward B. Bunn. At Loyola College, he constructed the college chapel. His tenure as president came to an end on August 14, 1950, and he was succeeded by Thomas Murray. He then returned to Georgetown briefly as assistant archivist, before becoming a parish priest at St. Aloysius Church in Washington, and writing the history of the parish.

He then performed retreat work at Manresa on the Severn in Annapolis, Maryland, from 1952 to 1953. That year, he returned to Georgetown, where he was a parish priest at Holy Trinity Church. There, he died of pneumonia on December 3, 1953, in the church rectory. His requiem mass was said by John Michael McNamara, the Auxiliary Bishop of Washington, at Holy Trinity on December 6, and was buried in the Jesuit Community Cemetery at Georgetown.

== Writings ==
- Jesuit Education in Philadelphia: Saint Joseph's College, 1851–1926. Philadelphia: Saint Joseph's College. 1927. OCLC 705685873.
- Richard Henry Tierney: Priest of the Society of Jesus. New York: The America Press. 1930. OCLC 4125364.
- Shining in Darkness: Dramas of the Nativity and the Resurrection. New York: Longmans, Green & Co. 1932. OCLC 934510955.
- Saint Among Savages: The Life of Isaac Jogues. New York: Harper & Brothers. 1935. ISBN 9780898709131. OCLC 1031789367.
- Saint Among the Hurons: The Life of Jean de Brébeuf. New York: Doubleday. 1956. OCLC 7959009.
- Talbot, Francis X. (December 1939). "The Future of "Thought"". Thought. 14 (4): 527–531. doi:10.5840/thought19391441. S2CID 170913284.

Academic offices
Preceded by Edward B. Bunn	20th President of Loyola College in Maryland; 1947–1950	Succeeded by Thomas Murray
