= Thought: Fordham University Quarterly =

- Discipline: Philosophy, Religious Studies
- Language: English
- Edited by: Wilfrid Parsons, S.J (founding editor)

Publication details
- Former name(s): Thought: A Review of Culture and Ideas
- History: 1926–1992
- Publisher: Fordham University Press (United States)
- Frequency: Quarterly

Standard abbreviations
- ISO 4: Thought

Indexing
- ISSN: 0040-6457 (print); 2154-2139 (web)
- LCCN: 30-22096
- OCLC no.: 1767458

Links
- Journal homepage; Online access

Thought: Fordham University Quarterly was a peer-reviewed academic journal that published articles and reviews on a broad range of topics in the Catholic tradition. The journal was established in 1926 at the America Press and moved to Fordham University in 1939, with the first Fordham edition of the journal appearing in March 1940. It continued to be published at Fordham until 1992. The journal's first editor was Francis X. Talbot. During this time the journal published a total of 267 issues containing over 5,000 English-language contributions from well-known philosophers, theologians, social activists, and intellectuals in several countries. The entire collection is available online from the Philosophy Documentation Center.

== Notable contributors ==
- Joseph Bernadin
- Daniel Berrigan
- Dietrich von Hildebrand
- Quentin Lauer
- Bernard Lonergan
- Jacques Maritain
- Thomas Merton
- Walker Percy
- Karl Rahner
- Elizabeth Sewell
- Charles C. Tansill
- Elie Wiesel
- William K. Wimsatt

== See also ==
- List of philosophy journals
