= Students of Georgetown Inc. =

Non-profit public charitable organization at Georgetown University

Students of Georgetown Inc. (The Corp)
- Type: 501(c)(3) non-profit
- Founded: Georgetown University, 1972
- Headquarters: Washington, DC, United States
- Key people: Omar Alameddine (CEO); Wongel Gebru (COO); Isaac Friedman (CFO)
- Website: thecorp.org

Students of Georgetown Inc., commonly known as "The Corp" /ˈkɔːrp/, is a 501(c)(3) non-profit public charitable organization at Georgetown University in Washington, D.C., with seven subsidiary companies generating annual revenues in excess of $5 million. Only undergraduate students of Georgetown University work as employees or sit as members of the Corp's board of directors, distinguishing business operations at the Corp from other student-run companies such as Harvard Student Agencies, which allows non-students and alumni to serve as board members.

As a registered charity, The Corp's profits fund grants for student organizations, as well as scholarships for students, with each recipient being chosen by The Corp's Philanthropy Committee or board of directors.

Vital Vittles is the largest of seven businesses currently owned and operated by The Corp. Referred to by the company as "services", these businesses also include four campus coffee shops called Uncommon Grounds, More Uncommon Grounds (MUG), Midnight MUG, and The Hilltoss, the catering service known as Corp Catering, a convenience store called Hoya Snaxa, and a "seasonal" service — Corp Storage — which only operates at the beginning and end of each semester for storage. The Corp also has three internal departments: Marketing, IT, and Accounting.

== History ==
=== The 1970s ===
==== 1971 ====
The Corp finds its roots on May 2, 1971. On the preceding day, large-scale May Day protests took place throughout Washington, D.C., ending in clashes between protesters and police. Protesters sought refuge from the Metropolitan Police Department by coming to the campus of Georgetown University where, on May 3, Rev. Robert J. Henle, S.J, the university's president, authorized the police department to use tear gas to disperse and remove the protesters. Many students were caught in the middle of the violence.

In October of that year, Student Body President Roger Cochetti and Vice President Nancy Kent determined that the only way to protect students' rights was to form a separate legal entity that would have the authority to challenge the university's actions. The student government subsequently incorporated the undergraduate students of Georgetown University as "shareholders" in a new organization called "Students of Georgetown, Inc." in order to provide a means of filing lawsuits on behalf of students against the university.

==== 1972 ====
On March 6, 1972, Students of Georgetown was officially incorporated as a non-profit organization in the District of Columbia.

Cochetti described the organization's goals as "to assert and protect the inherent rights of its members and the community" through the use of powers available to corporations, such as making contracts, borrowing money, and receiving property. The organization soon began using its independent status to develop and expand a number of new businesses designed for students' needs. It is not known when the organization formally adopted the name "The Corp."

Shortly thereafter, students began selling extremely low-cost yogurt and water on the university's Healy Lawn to fund the fledgling corporation—at times to the same demonstrators whose gassing had prompted the group's formation. The program, In September 1972 the Corp assumed control of The Book Co-op—another, older student-run business. The Book Co-op is the only Corp business to actually predate the Corp.

The Corp opened its first storefront called "The Record Co-op" or "Diemusbiederplatz" in the basement of New South Hall that same month.

==== 1973 ====
In 1973, the Corp expanded to open three new services.

In August, the Corp opened the Furniture Co-op to assist students living off-campus with the troublesome task of moving into and out of the often-cramped Georgetown Townhouses. In its first year the Furniture Co-op moved roughly 400 items.

On September 6, 1973, the Corp used a $14,000 grant from the university and $3,500 gift from Student Government to open its first shuttle service. The program, Corp Shuttles, was developed to provide transportation to and from the Alban Towers, student housing located roughly 1.5 miles (2.4 km) from the university's main campus. The program suffered from a lack of rider support and little to no funding. With the construction of new residence halls and apartment complexes on campus, the need for the service ended, and operations were re-absorbed by the university. Today the program has expanded to become the Georgetown University Transportation Shuttle (GUTS), which operates five bus circuits in the Washington Metropolitan area.

In November 1973, Corp Travel was opened. The new business provided much-needed travel assistance for the growing number of students who chose to study abroad during part of their college career. Today, roughly 40% of Georgetown University undergraduates study abroad before graduation.

==== 1974 ====
On January 25, 1974, the Corp finally sued Georgetown University, claiming that the university's actions on May 3, 1971, were discriminatory.

Three days later, The Corp opened Vital Vittles in the basement of the New South Hall dormitory. Vital Vittles (or "Vittles") was an expanded version of the original Food Co-op. Within the decade, the university would open its first large-scale dining hall in the same space.

In April 1974 the Corp sponsored the first annual Vincent Lombardi Tennis Tournament for charity. The tournament raised $6,000 in its first year and featured athletes such as Stan Smith and Jimmy Connors. The tournament lasted only three years, being discontinued in 1976 because of legal issues with the United States National Lawn Tennis Association (USLTA).

During the summer of 1974, Corp Travel separated from the Corp for various management reasons. It re-joined the Corp in 1979.

In October 1974, the Corp was denied tax-exempt status by the Internal Revenue Service. That same month, the Corp helped start the Georgetown University Recycling Program.

==== 1975 ====
The year 1975 marked the first time that the Corp had been in existence since the arrival of all four contemporary undergraduate classes. As the corporation's founding generation moved on, its successors were left to face the problems associated with maintaining a large company, regaining tax-exempt status, and developing better relationships with the university it had just sued.

In January 1975 the Corp restructured its upper management, deciding to institutionalize one-year terms for its officer and managers. In February, the Corp agreed to pay rent to the university in order to solve legal questions related with the tax-exempt statuses of the Corp and the university itself. The new costs strained the company's ability to operate, and that summer the Record Co-op and Vital Vittles were forced to merge into one business, nicknamed "Audio Vittles."

While other parts of the Corp consolidated or were closed, the company continued to pursue new ventures. In September 1975 the Corp began Corp Concessions for athletic games. The university later canceled the concessions contract with the Corp in favor of Hoyas Unlimited, a booster club that hired work-study varsity athletes.

==== 1976 ====
In 1976 the Corp's board of directors voted to pay its top management for the first time.

==== 1977 ====
In 1977 the Corp began Summer Storage—a business that allowed students to store their belongings during the summer break. Though closed twice during the 1980s and redesigned five times, the business continues to operate today as Corp Student Storage.

In November 1977 Vital Vittles began selling bongs and condoms.

==== 1978 ====
Barely four months after Vital Vittles began to sell them, Georgetown University blocked the sale of condoms.

In April 1978, the Corp's board of directors voted to participate in a boycott of Nestle because of allegations that Nestle was selling baby food and baby formula in third world countries made with non-potable water.

Also in 1978, the Corp opened Corp Typing. Long before the mass-production of desktop printers, this service gave students the opportunity to have Corp employees type their papers for a fee. Corp Typing's sister service, Corp Copying, also opened in 1978.

==== 1979 ====
In 1979, the Corp moved Vital Vittles' non-food sales into the new Saxa Sundries drugstore, which opened in the basement of Georgetown University's Copley Hall.

Also in that year, the Corp was denied tax-exempt status for the second time.

=== The 1980s ===
==== 1980 ====
On September 23, 1980, the Corp applied for tax-exempt status for the third time.

==== 1981 ====
In March, the IRS awarded the Corp tax-exempt status—refunding several years of back taxes to the corporation.

Also in that year, the university canceled its contract with Corp Concessions in favor of Hoyas Unlimited.

In October, the board of directors changed the pay system for the Corp's officers and managers from a salary to a wage system.

==== 1982 ====
In January, the board of directors restructured the Corp's management again to include three officers: executive vice president, vice president of operations and vice president of finance.

Later that year the Corp opened the Alban Annex—a convenience store in the Alban Towers apartment complex similar to, but smaller than the Corp's Vital Vittles.

Also in 1982 the Corp expanded the role of its marketing divisions into Corp Advertising, which provided graphic design services for university clubs. That same year, the Corp closed its Summer Storage business. It was re-opened two years later.

In November, Saxa Sundries moved to the basement of Healy Hall.

==== 1983 ====
Throughout the 1980s the Corp struggled to redefine its relationship with its parent organization, the student government. In 1983 the Corp's board of directors renamed the position of executive vice president to president of students of Georgetown, Incorporated and officially recognized the student government president as chairman of the board of Students of Georgetown, Incorporated. This relationship placed additional strain on the Corp, which sought to uphold its independent status. By 1990, the Corp would break its ties with the student government altogether, and become a completely independent organization.

==== 1985 ====
In 1985, the Corp opened its new ice cream parlor, which was named The Cone Zone by a campus-wide "Name the Store" contest. The store suffered from its bad location and could not compete with Thomas Sweets' ice cream parlor only a few blocks away. It was closed by the end of 1986.

==== 1986 ====
In February 1986, the Corp's board of directors lifted its ban on the sale of condoms in its stores. However, the move proved to be largely symbolic as no Corp service has sold condoms since the university banned their sales in Vital Vittles in 1977.

==== 1988, 1989 ====
Apart from its initial creation, the single most significant event in the history of the Corp was the construction of the Thomas and Dorothy Leavey Center. After the building's construction, the Corp transferred its main office and all of its services to the new building. The services at the time included Vital Vittles; Saxa Sundries, which was later incorporated into Vital Vittles; Corp Travel, which closed in 2000; Movie Mayhem, which was replaced with MovieMayhem.org in 2005; Corp Typing (a resume and term paper typing service that closed in the early '90s); and Corp Advertising, which was closed and internalized as the Corp Marketing Department in 1997.

=== The 1990s ===
In the 1990s, the Corp formally severed all of its ties with Georgetown University. What had once been an independent organization operated by the university's student government developed as a completely autonomous company.

In 1991, the Corp celebrated its 20th birthday with a weekend full of events on campus and specials in the stores. The Conelles played in McDonough parking lot, door prizes were awarded at the pub, and the comedian Jake Johansen was brought to Gaston Hall. Both the Conelles show and the Jake Johansen show were free to students.

The controversy over condoms erupted again in 1992 when the Corp again tried to sell them in Saxa Sundries. As part of its lease at the Leavy Center, the Corp had to have a university-approved product list, which it did. On that list included the item of "health aids". Corp management solicited input from the medical and nursing schools that condoms were indeed "health aids" and thus were permitted by the lease. Condoms were ordered and delivered to Saxa's stock room for eventual placement on the shelves. Management informed the university of this planned action, at which time the university stated that it did not consider condoms an approved item under the lease. The university also pointed out that the lease stated if an "offending" product was not removed from the store's shelves within 24 hours of a university protest, the university would exercise its rights as landlord to temporarily close the Corp's stores until the items were removed. On the eve of the planned stocking of condoms on Saxa's shelves, management held a General Meeting to assess the reaction of Corp employees to this possible closure action. The majority of employees argued against stocking the condoms, saying that by putting the Corp in jeopardy of being closed, management was not truly serving the students. Given this argument, management reversed course and decided not to stock the condoms. The supply in the Saxa's storeroom was donated to other organizations on campus.

Also in 1991–92, several major capital expenditures were made: The back offices were remodeled with new desks, a new phone system, and new computers; and a new Point-of-Sale system was purchased for Vittles and Saxas. Saxa's main supplier was switched to McKesson, and Vittles became the largest independent seller of Coke products in the mid-Atlantic region.

In 1994, the Corp won a bid to construct Georgetown University's first coffee shop in the university's Leavey Center. Beating out bids from rival companies, the Corp opened Uncommon Grounds a year later.

In 1995, the Corp decided to consolidate Vital Vittles (food products) and Saxa Sundries (non-food products), tearing down the wall between them and creating one combined greater store. They decided to keep the name Vital Vittles for the new store as it had a registered trademark.

In 1999, the Corp built upon the success of Uncommon Grounds and opened a second coffee shop, More Uncommon Grounds (MUG) in the lobby of Georgetown University's Intercultural Center.

In 1997 Corp Advertising was closed and internalized as Corp Marketing Department, the organization's chief marketing division.

=== The 2000s: The Corp today ===
In 2000, the Corp closed its Corp Travel business and opened a film developing store called Full Exposure (FX). FX was closed five years later.

In 2003, the Corp opened its third coffee shop, The Midnight MUG, in Georgetown University's Lauinger Library.

In 2004, the Corp launched www.TheCorp.org and began to use a website to conduct the Book Co-op service more efficiently.

In 2005, the Corp closed its Full Exposure film developing service and Movie Mayhem video delivery store, and created Corp Information Technology and MovieMayhem.org.

In 2007, the Corp terminated its ailing MovieMayhem.org service, citing a failure to generate profits, inability to compete with business such as NetFlix and iTunes, and a lack of student demand for a campus-based DVD delivery service. The last deliveries were made to students in December and the Web site was permanently taken offline.

Later that month, the Corp launched a new Web site, CorpStorage.org, which modified the existing Student Storage business model to allow for online purchasing. The new site also allows for expanded Corp e-commerce across all services.

In 2014, the Corp opened the doors to a smoothie, açai bowl, salad, and health-food shop, The Hilltoss. Located inside the Healey Family Family Student Center, the idea was crowd sourced from the student body in 2012 and provides a healthy dining option on the south side of campus.

In 2016, the Corp incorporated its latest coffee shop, Grounded, into the same location as Hilltoss. Grounded offered many breakfast-adjacent food and drink options.

== Current businesses ==
=== The Food Corp, or Vital Vittles (est. 1972, 1974) ===
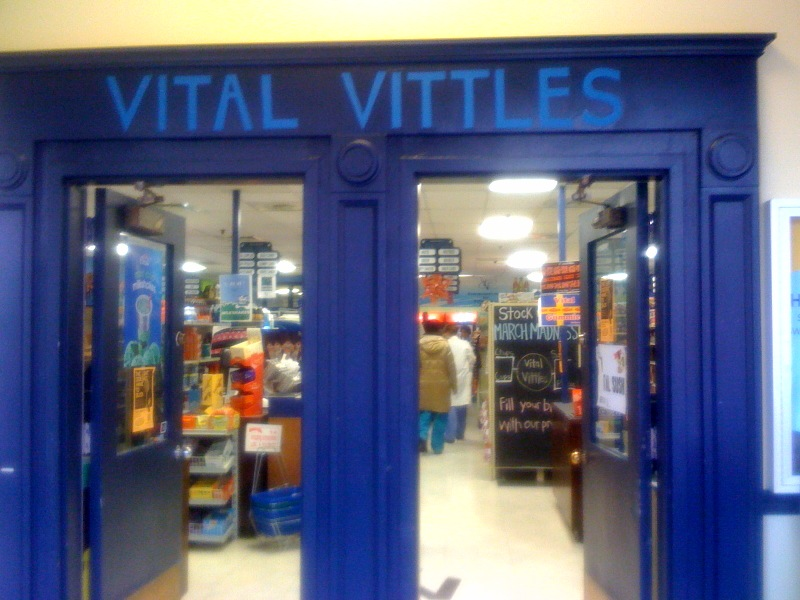
Vital Vittles is The Corp's oldest business, serving as a campus grocery.

The descendant of the Corp's oldest original business, the Food Co-op, Vital Vittles is the Corp's oldest and largest original business, employing over fifty students. The Food Co-op began its operations as a fruit and yogurt stand for the newly created Corp in 1972 and joined the Book Co-op and the Record Co-op in the basement of Healy Hall. Two years later, the Corp expanded its food selection by moving the business into the larger basement of the New South Hall dormitory. The popularity of the location prompted the university to establish its first large dining hall in that space.

The Food Co-op, now operating under the name Vital Vittles, later moved back to the basement of Georgetown University's Healy Hall, then to the basement of the university's Copley Hall dormitory. In 1989 it moved for the final time when the Corp moved all of its operations to the new Thomas and Dorothy Leavey Center, where it shared a space with Saxa Sundries. When Saxa Sundries closed its operations, the space of both stores was combined into one, allowing for the expansion of Vital Vittles into a large grocery store.

=== Student Storage (est. 1977, 1980, 1982, 1990, 2005, 2007) ===
Corp Summer Storage was founded in 1977 as a summer storage service for Georgetown undergraduates, ostensibly providing an option more convenient than leaving belongings with friends. In 1982 the service was closed, only to be re-opened again in 1984. In 1990, a shipping element was added to the service, which became Corp Shipping & Storage. However, with the introduction of several competing shipping services close to campus, the Corp found that there was little market for the new addition. In 2005, the service transformed itself once again into Student Storage, which offers storage for the summer break, as well as study-abroad storage for semester and year-long terms. The final transformation of Corp Student Storage took place in December, 2007, with the launch of a new Web site, Storage.theCorp.org. The new site eliminated the need for paper contracts, making the service one of the first Corp services to dramatically reduce its environmental impact. The new site allows for greater competition with off-campus storage competitors, while still allowing the Corp to offer students the lowest prices.

=== Uncommon Grounds (est. 1994) ===
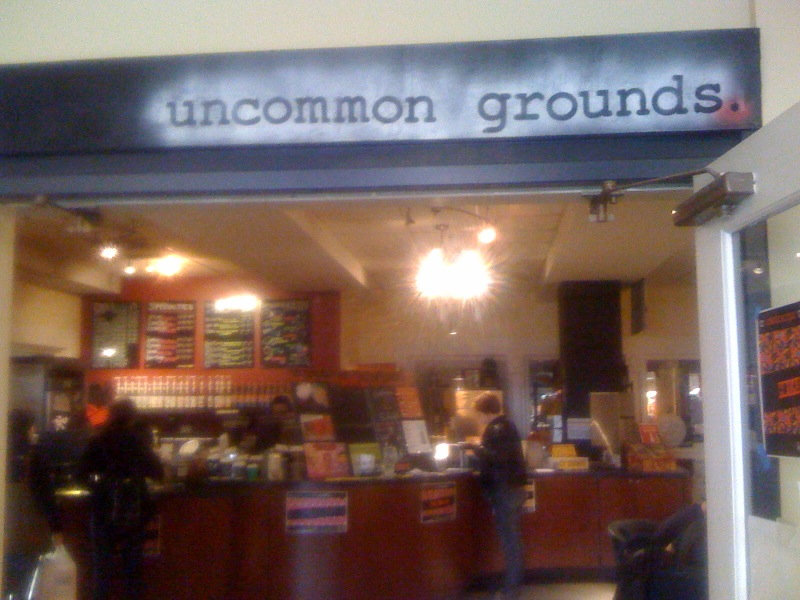
Uncommon Groups is a coffee shop in the Leavey Center.

The first of three coffee shops opened by the Corp, Uncommon Grounds was begun as a joint project by the Corp and the Georgetown University Office of Student Affairs.

One of the newest undertakings of Uncommon Grounds has been a "drink of the month" program. Every month, the proceeds from the sale of one specialized drink are donated to a charity chosen by the coffee shop in an effort to further the philanthropic purpose of the company.

Uncommon Grounds also provides a catering service under the name of Uncommon Catering. In 2007, Uncommon Catering took its catering to a new level by catering GAAP (Georgetown Admissions Ambassadors Program) Weekends. This was crucial as it exposed Uncommon Catering to a wider audience within Georgetown and immediately increased demand. This was also significant in that it was the first time any Corp service competed directly with Marriott for the GAAP weekend catering contact. The newfound demand for Uncommon Catering, unfortunately, outweighed the number of the employees at Uncommon Grounds and Uncommon Catering began exploring the feasibility of expanding as its own service. As it currently stands, Uncommon Catering is continuing to grow and is working internally to spin off from Uncommon Grounds to become its own service within the corporation.

=== MUG (More Uncommon Grounds, est. 1999) ===
MUG was opened in 1999 in the Galeria of the Georgetown University Intercultural Center. It began as a mobile coffee cart, an extension of Uncommon Grounds. In the last few years, though, it has established itself as a full coffee service for the Corp.

=== The Midnight MUG (est. 2003) ===
The Midnight MUG is the newest stand-alone coffee shop operated by the Corp. It was developed in partnership with the Georgetown University Lauinger Library, where it is located. Of all seven external services in the Corp, the Midnight Mug generates the most revenue. "Midnight," as students have been known to call it colloquially, embodies the Corp's motto of students serving students through its Drink of the Month program, similar to Uncommon Grounds's, and the Office Hours program which sometimes discounts purchases for students and teaching assistants using the space for office hours (but not always). Midnight operates the most extensive hours of any service in the Corp opening at 8 am on weekdays and staying open until 2 am on weeknights.

=== Hoya Snaxa (est. 2003) ===
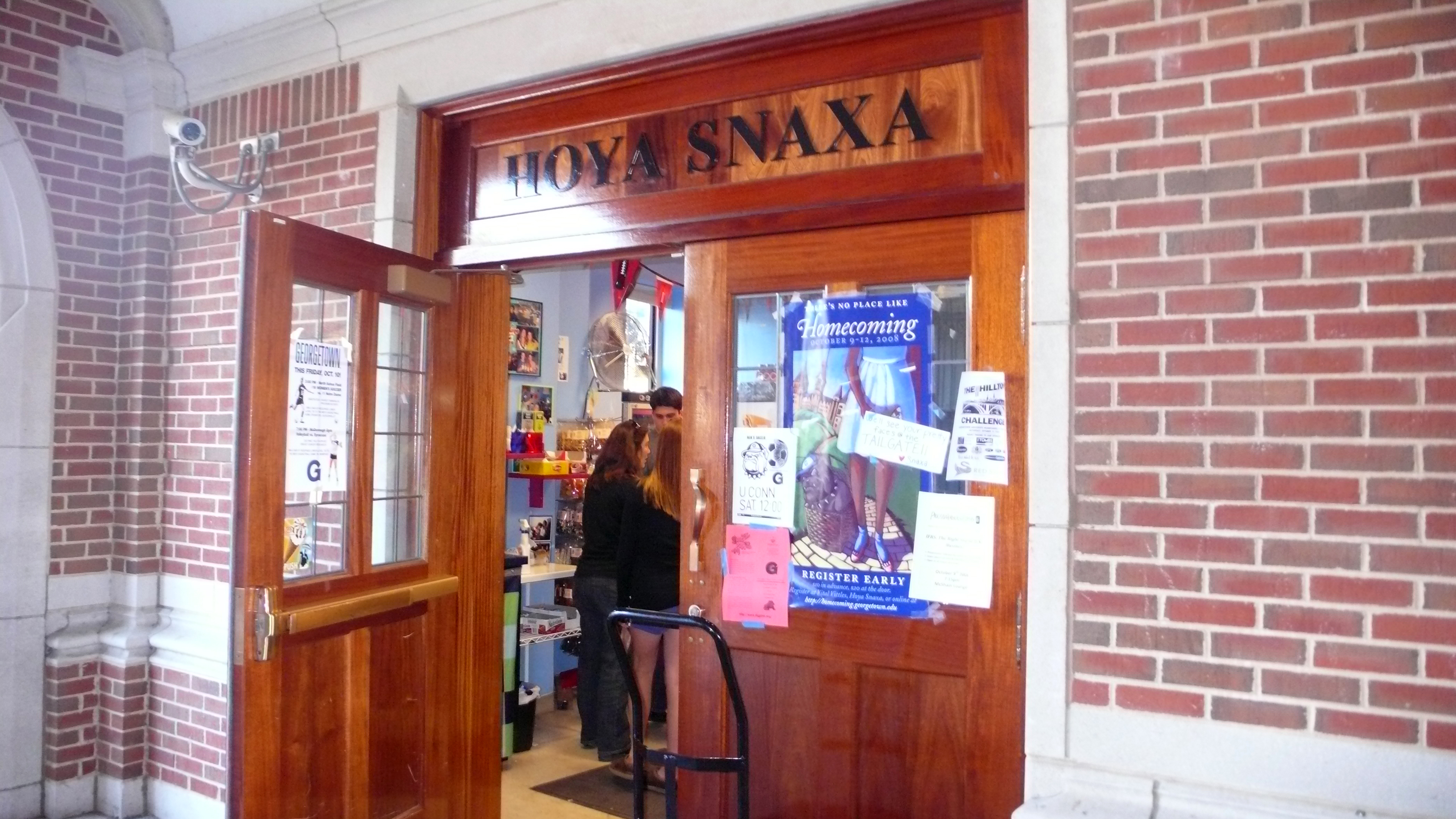
Opened in August 2003, Hoya Snaxa is the Corp's youngest storefront service

In 2003, after more than three years and $188 million in development, Georgetown University completed construction on its largest dormitory structure, the Southwest Quadrangle. Anticipating the needs of the Quad's 900+ residents, the Corp opened a convenience store on the ground floor of the structure's central dormitory, Kennedy Hall. The Corp sponsored a campus-wide contest in the spring of 2003 that gave Georgetown students the opportunity to name the new store. The winning entry, Hoya Snaxa, is a clever take on the university's sporting cheer, "Hoya Saxa!" Although cashiers were hired in the spring of 2003, Hoya Snaxa's original management team consisted of employees "borrowed" from the Corp's flagship grocery store, Vital Vittles.

In an effort to meet the demands of its customers, Hoya Snaxa gradually added new products throughout its second year, including ice cream, Phillies cigars, and concert tickets. These expansions proved profitable; in its second fiscal year, Hoya Snaxa posted its first-ever positive net income, with revenues up 21% from the previous year.

During its third year of operations, Hoya Snaxa expanded its services to include sandwiches, Skoal tobacco products, and hummus. A slushie machine was installed in the summer of 2005. Although revenues continued to climb nearly 24% from the year before, the store's gross profit dropped 3% during its third fiscal year. It was near the end of this year that Hoya Snaxa reached $1 million in cumulative revenues.

=== Corp Catering (est. 2007) ===
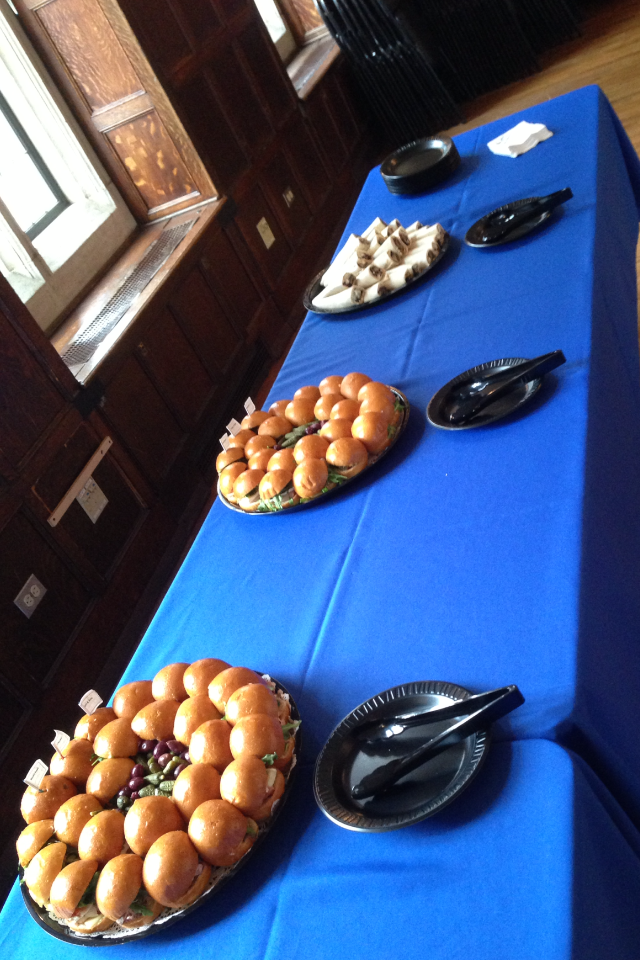
Since 2007, Corp Catering has been serving the Georgetown community

Founded in 2007, Corp Catering provides a wide range of products to the Georgetown community, including: breakfast platters (bagels, muffins, assorted fruits), flavored beverages and coffee, party snacks and trays, and much more. Catering continues to experience tremendous growth, with the highest gross profit among all Corp internet Services and revenues in excess of $150,000 for fiscal 2012. In the spring of 2013, Catering revamped its website to include a more user-friendly experience and to emphasize its focus on high-quality, affordable offerings with professional service.

=== The Hilltoss (est. 2014) ===
The Hilltoss is the Corp's newest location. Founded in 2014, it serves a variety of organic salads, smoothies and acai bowls. In 2016, Grounded, the newest Corp coffee shop, was also incorporated into the location. The Hilltoss is located in the new student center, the Healey Family Student Center, which is located on the ground floor of New South Hall, where the university's main dining hall resided until 2003. The Hilltoss opened along with the HFSC in early November 2014, and was incorporated into construction plans for the building.

=== Grounded (est. 2016) ===
Grounded is the Corp's newest coffee and dining option. Established as an addition to Hilltoss in 2016, grounded offers a variety of coffees, teas, specialty drinks and toasts, and bagel sandwiches.

== Departments ==
=== Corp Accounting ===
Directed by the controller and reporting to the chief financial officer, Corp Accounting tracks the organization's cash flow and investments. Because many Corp services have developed different business models, the Corp Accounting department centralizes the Corp's sprawling accounting needs. Individual services are assigned one or two accountants that work with the service director to monitor purchasing as well as store operations.

The accounting department adopts a similar structure to other Corp services with a service Upper Management. The Upper Management consists of the controller, an assistant controller/director of POS accounting, a director of personnel, and an accounts payable manager.

Corp Accounting provides its employees with a fundamental understanding of how the company is run. It is the last line of defense that ensures the continual operation of the services.

=== Corp POps ===
The Corp's People Operations Department has a staff of four managers— the director of POps oversees the department and serves on The Corp's upper management, the director of POps Operations handles payroll, federal work study and employee systems, the director of employee relations oversees a team of directors of personnel for each service, and the director of professional development works with Corp employees as they search for internships and full-time post graduate opportunities. The Corp became a federal work study employer through Georgetown University in 2005.

=== Corp IT ===
Corp Information Technology was created in 2005 as the Corp's internal technologies management department to deal with the organization's increasing systems and network administration needs. Later that year it was awarded a contract to construct the website for the Georgetown University Prince Alwaleed Center for Muslim–Christian Understanding.

=== Corp Marketing ===
The Corp Marketing Department was originally an internal marketing division of the Corp. In 1982, it was expanded as a business called Corp Advertising and provided graphic design services for Georgetown University student clubs. In 1997, Corp Advertising was closed due to decreased business and re-internalized as the Corp Marketing Department. It once again serves as the Corp's internal marketing division.

=== Corp Capital ===
Corp Capital was established in 2011 as an internal $50,000 investment fund with a focus on education and training for its members.

== Philanthropy Committee ==
The Corp Philanthropy Committee (CPC) was founded in 2005. The committee is responsible for assisting the Philanthropy Chair in all aspects of Corp Philanthropy. The CPC was created to help those groups and students on campus who could not find funding otherwise.

== Board projects ==
=== Turkey Shuttles ===
The Turkey Shuttles program was established as a board project in 2004 and continues today. The Turkey Shuttles provide low-cost bus transit for Georgetown University students on their way to Ronald Reagan Washington National Airport, Washington Dulles International Airport, Baltimore-Washington Thurgood Marshall International Airport, and Union Station before the Thanksgiving holiday. Estimates suggest that the Turkey Shuttles program saved Georgetown students roughly $7,000 in transportation costs during each of its first two years in operation.

=== Bunny Shuttles ===
The Bunny Shuttles program was established in the spring of 2006 as a sister-program to the Turkey Shuttles service project begun two years earlier, but ended because of a severe lack of interest and profitability in 2011. Like Turkey Shuttles, Bunny Shuttles provided low-cost bus transit for Georgetown University students on their way to Ronald Reagan Washington National Airport, Washington Dulles International Airport, Baltimore-Washington Thurgood Marshall International Airport, and Union Station before the Easter holiday.

== Past businesses ==
Over the years, The Corp has closed several businesses which failed to generate revenue it saw as sufficient to fund the organization's needs. A list of these businesses includes an ice cream store called The Cone Zone and the Full Exposure film developing business. One business, the Saxa Sundries drug store, was annexed by its sister business, the Vital Vittles grocery store, which continues to operate today.

Food Corp	1972–1974	The Food Co-op was the first business operated by the Corp and later became Vital Vittles. It was started in the basement of New South Hall, a dormitory on the Georgetown University campus. In its earliest form the Food Co-op sold only yogurt and Coca-Cola.
Record Corp (or Audio Vittles)	1973–1975	One of the original businesses started by the Corp (and, during the spring of 1973, its largest), the Record Co-op sold vinyl records out of the basement of Healy Hall for two years. It was renamed "Audio Vittles" when, in 1975, it merged with the Vital Vittles grocery store. In 1979 all record sales were transferred to Saxa Sundries.
Furniture Corp	1973-198?	Another of the original businesses started by the Corp, the Furniture Co-op sold used and discount furniture to nearly 700 students during its first year of operation.
Corp Shuttles	1973-197?	An ancestor of the current Georgetown University Transportation Shuttles (GUTS), Corp Shuttles provided service to roughly 300 students living in Arlington, VA and the Alban Towers apartments in Washington, DC. The Shuttles were later replaced by the university's free GUTS system.
Corp Travel	1974–2000	One of the longest continually operated business by the Corp, Corp Travel closed its doors in 2000 due to an increase in online travel planning. The Corp replaced Corp Travel with Full Exposure.
Corp Typing	1978-198?	Typing services for student essays and other papers.
Corp Copying	1978-198?	Copying services for student papers and other documents.
Saxa Sundries	1979-1995	An original sister-store to Vital Vittles, Saxa Sundries sold non-food items to students for nearly twenty years. Both Vital Vittles and Saxa Sundries moved from the basement of Georgetown University's Copley Hall to the new Leavey Center in the 1988. In 1995, Saxa Sundries was assimilated into the operations of Vital Vittles and ceased operating under a separate brand.
Summer Storage	1984–1990	Summer Storage was resurrected in 1984 due to student demand. It was replaced in 1990 with Corp Shipping and Storage.
The Cone Zone	1985-1986	An ice cream parlor located above Wisemiller's Grocery & Deli at 1236 36th St NW.
Movie Mayhem	1989-2007	A VHS and DVD movie rental service. Closed in December 2007 due to competition from online movie vendors like iTunes and Netflix.
Shipping and Storage	1990–2005	In 1990, the Corp expanded its Summer Storage business with a new business which provided students with the option of shipping their belongings home during the summer break, in addition to storing their items on the Georgetown University campus. Shipping and Storage was replaced in 2005 when the Corp decided to cancel its shipping program. Today, Student Storage allows students to store their belongings on campus during the summer break, or either semester.
Full Exposure	2000–2005	The most recently closed Corp business was Full Frontal Exposure (or FFX), a film developing service based in Georgetown University's Leavey Center. In 2000, the Corp's board of directors acquired a $104,055 loan to purchase equipment for the opening of the new business. Throughout its existence, the business was plagued by competition with rapidly improving digital photography technology. By the 2005 Fiscal Year, expenditures for FX rose to a total of $89,010, but increased digital camera usage by students hurt the business's revenues and, within 5 years, rendered it obsolete.
