= Gerard J. Campbell =

American Jesuit academic administrator

The Reverend Gerard J. Campbell SJ
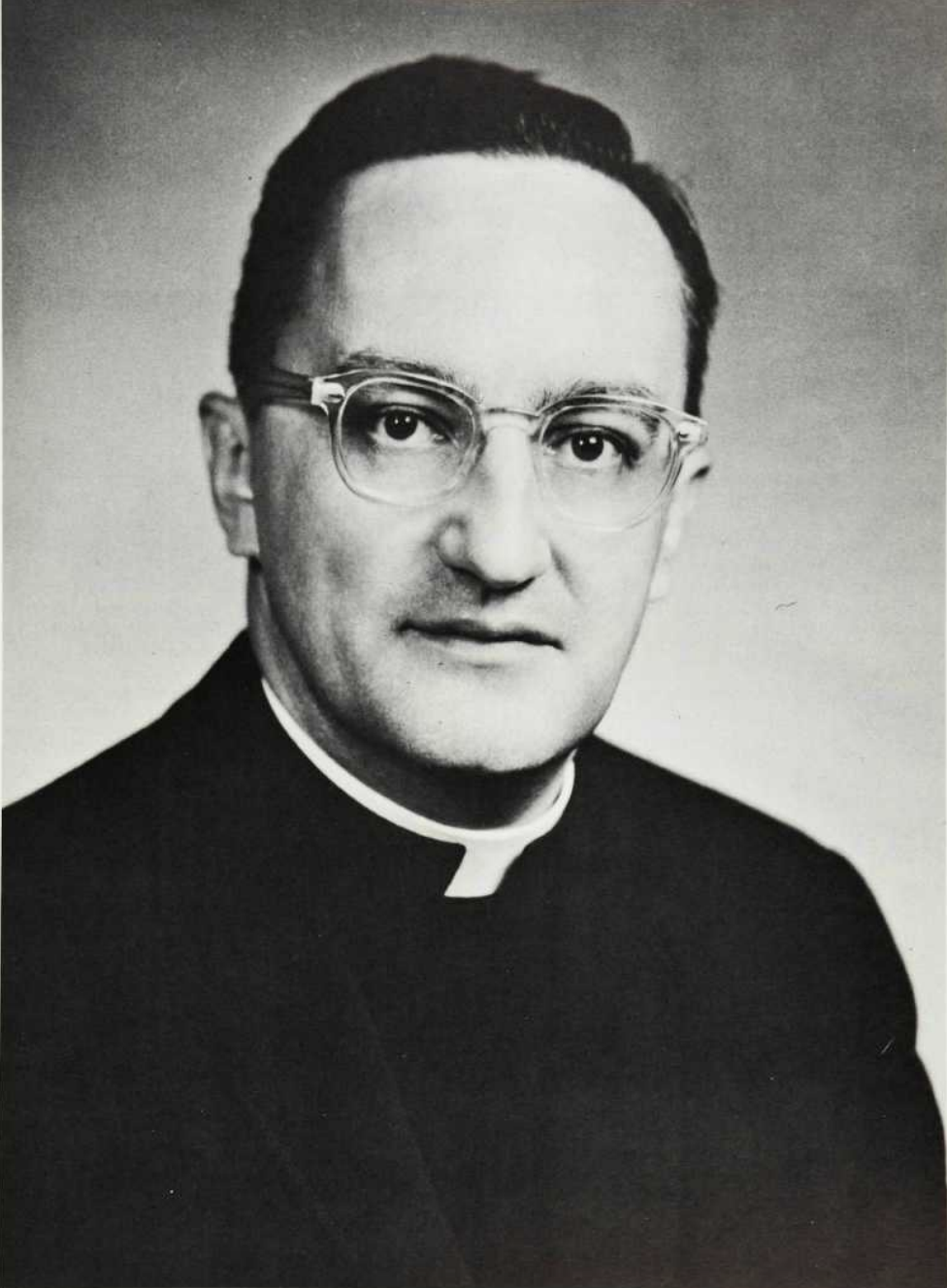
- Campbell in 1965

44th President of Georgetown University
- In office 1964–1968
- Preceded by: Edward B. Bunn
- Succeeded by: Robert J. Henle

Personal details
- Born: August 26, 1919 St. Marys, Pennsylvania, U.S.
- Died: August 9, 2012 (aged 92) Washington, D.C., U.S.
- Resting place: Jesuit Community Cemetery
- Education: West Baden College (BA, PhL); Fordham University (MA); Princeton University (PhD)

Orders
- Ordination: 1951

Gerard John Campbell SJ (August 26, 1919 – August 9, 2012) was an American Catholic priest, Jesuit, and historian who became the president of Georgetown University. Born in Pennsylvania, he entered the Society of Jesus at the age of 20 and studied at West Baden College and Fordham University, before earning his doctorate at Princeton University. A promising historian, he then taught at Loyola University Maryland, before becoming the executive vice president of Georgetown University in 1963, where he effectively worked as acting president.

The following year, Campbell was appointed the president of Georgetown University. He continued the work of his predecessor to modernize the institution. Extensively reorganizing the university's governance, he amended its congressional charter, legally separated Georgetown from the Society of Jesus, and transformed the composition of its board of directors from senior Jesuit administrators to laypeople and Jesuits unaffiliated with the university. He also recruited prominent faculty in the humanities and social sciences, and gave faculty a direct role in administration by creating a faculty senate. At the end of his term, ground was broken on Lauinger Library, which greatly expanded the university's library capacity.

Campbell's tenure as president was brief, as he preferred scholarship over academic administration. Combined with a mounting budgetary deficit, he resigned the office in 1968. Campbell then worked for the Jesuits' Maryland Province before becoming rector of the Jesuit novitiate in Wernersville, Pennsylvania. He returned to Georgetown as the director of the Woodstock Theological Center in 1979, and then founded the Center for Jesuit Spirituality at Holy Trinity Church.

== Early life ==
Gerard John Campbell was born on August 26, 1919, in St. Marys, Pennsylvania. He entered the Society of Jesus in 1939, and began his studies at West Baden College, a Jesuit seminary in Indiana, where he received a Bachelor of Arts in Latin in 1943, and a Licentiate of Philosophy. In 1945, he became a professor at Saint Joseph's College in Philadelphia.

Campbell followed the classical, Jesuit liberal arts curriculum at Loyola University Chicago and Woodstock College, and was ordained a priest in 1951. He then received a Master of Arts in history from Fordham University in 1954. He completed his education at Princeton University, where he earned a Doctor of Philosophy in history in 1957. The Princeton faculty were impressed by Campbell's academic potential, and he was considered a promising historian. After receiving his doctorate, he became a professor of history at Loyola University Maryland. He remained there until 1962, when he returned to Princeton for postdoctoral work.

== Georgetown University ==
While at Princeton in 1963, Campbell learned that he had been appointed the executive vice president of Georgetown University. Georgetown's president, Edward B. Bunn, and the provincial superior of the Jesuits' Maryland province had decided that Campbell would fill the newly created position to allow Bunn to travel extensively to raise money for the university. For the one year that he was vice president, he functioned effectively as the acting president, and became the apparent successor to Bunn.

=== Presidency ===
On December 3, 1964, Campbell was appointed the president of Georgetown University. Aged 45, he assumed the office as one of the youngest presidents in the university's history, and was the first to hold a doctorate from a non-Catholic university. As a result, The Washington Post characterized him as a "new breed of Jesuit priest whose style might be described as Ivy League Catholic." Campbell sought to continue the work of his predecessor, and identified three objects as the most important on his agenda: the recruitment of talented faculty to improve postgraduate education, increasing the role of the university in the Washington, D.C. community, and significantly increasing fundraising. On January 31, 1965, Campbell served as the homilist for the Archdiocese of Washington's Red Mass, which was attended by President Lyndon B. Johnson, Lady Bird Johnson, presidential aid Jack J. Valenti, Supreme Court Justice William J. Brennan and Speaker of the House John W. McCormack.

Campbell undertook numerous reforms of the university's governance, bringing it into conformity with other American universities. Upon entering into office, he amended the university's antiquated congressional charter and created expansive bylaws to officially allow the university to govern itself as it unofficially already had been. This involved a separation of the board of directors, which controlled the university, from the corporation. The latter legally owned the university and the role of the five-member body was defined as being only to appoint its own successors and members of the board of directors. Reinventing the nature of the board, he greatly increased the role of the laity in the administration of the university. Campbell transformed the board from a body composed of exclusively senior Jesuit administrators at Georgetown to one that comprised laity and Jesuits unaffiliated with the university. Its role as a consultative body also gave way to one of actual governance.

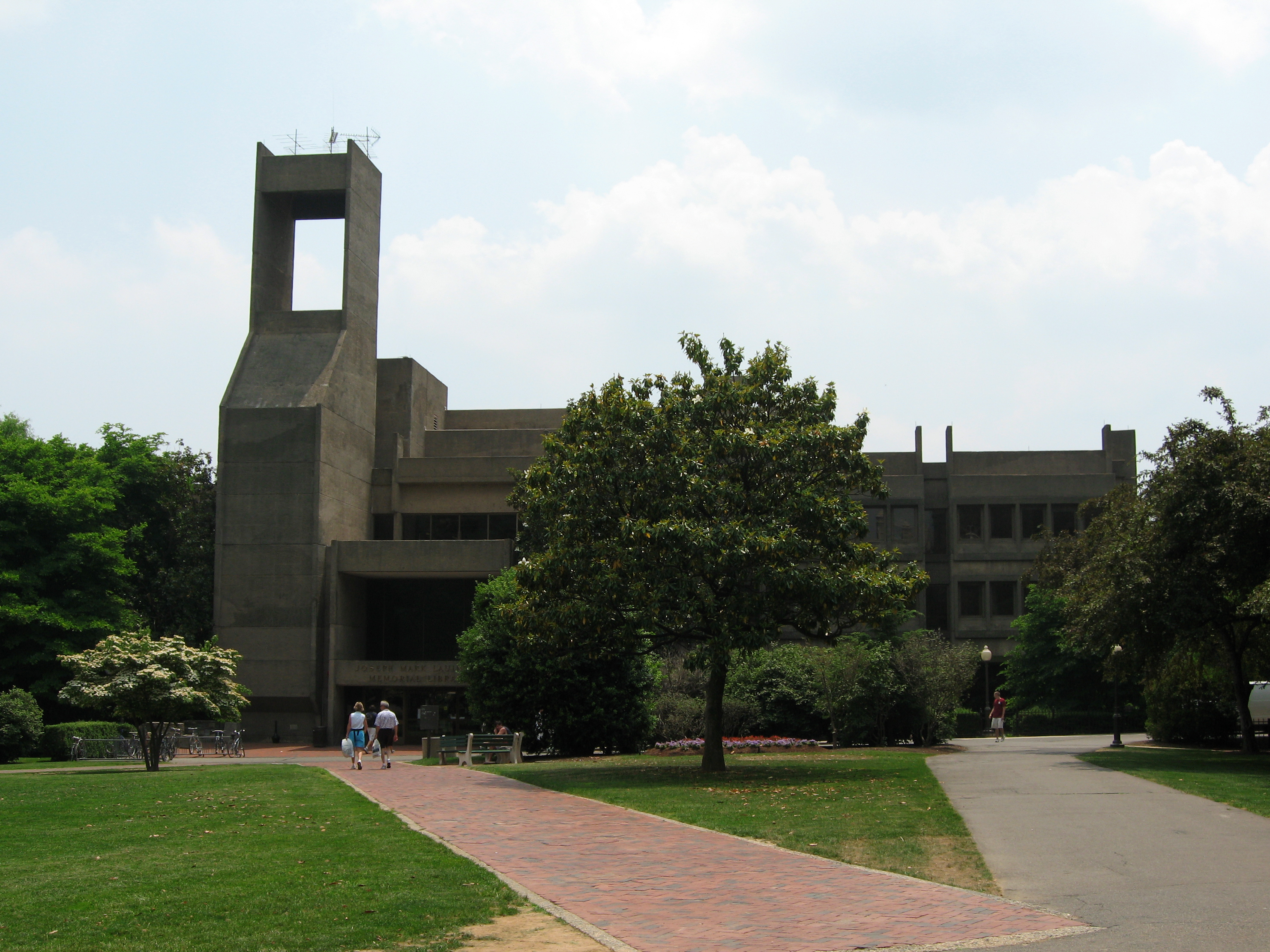
Fundraising began in 1965 for Lauinger Library, which opened in 1971, after Campbell's presidency.

The result of this reform of the board was that Georgetown became legally independent of the Society of Jesus. Therefore, Campbell had to obtain the permission of the Maryland provincial superior as well as the Superior General in Rome. He also secured an act of Congress to amend the charter, which was signed into law by President Lyndon Johnson in 1966. The Jesuit community at Georgetown was separately incorporated, and retained ownership of several historic buildings on campus. The offices of president of the university and rector of the Jesuit community were made separate and held by different people.

While Campbell's predecessor focussed particularly on improving the quality and stature of the science faculty, Campbell recruited esteemed faculty in the humanities and social sciences. The appointment of faculty became a more formalized process, with the creation of a rank and tenure committee, and the overall size of the faculty increased. Jesuits were no longer appointed to the faculty by the Jesuit superiors, and instead competed with all other applicants for positions. At the same time, the number of Jesuit faculty increased. The faculty was given a direct role in the administration of the university through the creation of a faculty senate.

In January 1965, Campbell began raising money for the construction of a new library, planning of which began several years earlier. Designed by John Carl Warnecke, ground was broken on Lauinger Library in 1968, and the building was completed in October 1971. The new facility greatly relieved the inadequate library space on campus. Alongside this expansion, Georgetown's operating budget had steadily increased. Campbell began a fundraising drive to raise $26 million beginning in 1966, which would fund fellowships, scholarships, pay salaries, and build the new Georgetown University Law Center. However, the drive raised just $15 million by 1968. Facing a severe deficit, the board of directors instituted strict austerity measures.

In addition to governance reforms, Campbell encouraged new community service initiatives by Georgetown students throughout the District of Columbia. He also signed the 1967 Land O'Lakes Statement, which redefined the mission of a modern Catholic university. Facing deteriorating health and the increasing campus turmoil of the late 1960s, Campbell resigned the presidency in 1968. Those close to him observed that during his brief term, he never enjoyed being president, and preferred to return to a life of scholarship. He was succeeded as president by Robert J. Henle.

== Later years ==
After stepping down as president, Campbell spent the rest of his life in Jesuit academic administration. He worked for the Jesuit Maryland Province, before becoming the rector of the Jesuit Novitiate of St. Isaac Jogues in Wernersville, Pennsylvania. In 1979, he returned to Georgetown University as the director of the Woodstock Theological Center. Four years later, he founded the Center of Jesuit Spirituality at Holy Trinity Church in the Georgetown neighborhood. He remained director of the spirituality center until his retirement in 2004.

Campbell died on August 9, 2012, of congestive heart failure, at the Georgetown University Jesuit residence. His funeral was held in Holy Trinity Church, and he was buried in the Jesuit Community Cemetery at Georgetown.

Academic offices
Preceded by Edward B. Bunn	44th President of Georgetown University; 1964—1968	Succeeded by Robert J. Henle
