= Edmund Ryan =

American Jesuit academic administrator

The Reverend Edmund Ryan SJ

19th President of Seattle University
- In office June 6, 1975 – March 8, 1976
- Preceded by: Louis B. Gaffney
- Succeeded by: William J. Sullivan

Personal details
- Died: January 26, 2001 Los Angeles, California, U.S.
- Education: Loyola University Chicago; West Baden College; Woodstock College; Catholic University of America

Orders
- Ordination: 1959

Edmund G. Ryan SJ (d. January 26, 2001) was an American Catholic priest and Jesuit who was the president of Seattle University for less than a year in 1975 and 1976. He was also a senior administrator at Saint Peter's College, Georgetown University, Canisius College, and Le Moyne College.

== Early life ==
Edmund Ryan was ordained a priest of the Jesuit order in 1959. He completed his undergraduate studies at Loyola University Chicago, and received degrees in theology from West Baden College in Indiana and Woodstock College in Maryland. He completed his master's and doctorate at the Catholic University of America.

== Academic administrator ==
Ryan served as the dean and executive vice president of Saint Peter's College in New Jersey, and then as provost and executive vice president of Georgetown University. Ryan did not get along with the president of Georgetown, Robert J. Henle, who accused Ryan of trying to undermine him. Relations between the two deteriorated significantly and Ryan refused to meet in his office with Henle, who he believed to be bugging the office. In April 1974, Henle fired Ryan. Two months later, Ryan was admitted to the psychiatric ward of Saint Vincent's Hospital in New York City for treatment of a nervous breakdown.

Ryan became the president of Seattle University on June 6, 1975. He was the first president of the university who was not from the Oregon province of the Society of Jesus. His administration saw significant student protest and financial difficulty, and his term lasted only 133 days before he resigned for medical and personal reasons on March 8, 1976. William J. Sullivan, whom Ryan had recruited to the university in 1975 as the provost for academic development, became the acting president on February 27 and officially succeeded Ryan as president on May 3.

After leaving Seattle University, Ryan became the director of planning and research at Canisius College in Buffalo, New York, and in 1978, became the executive vice president for academic affairs. He oversaw the renovation of several campus buildings and the expansion of the Bouwhuis Library. During this time, he was also a member of the boards of directors of several high schools in Buffalo. He left Canisius in 1992 and spent a year on sabbatical in California. Ryan then became the special assistant for mission and planning to the president of Le Moyne College in Syracuse, New York.

Ryan died at UCLA Medical Center in Los Angeles, California, on January 26, 2001.

Academic offices
Preceded by Louis B. Gaffney	19th President of Seattle University; 1975–1976	Succeeded by William J. Sullivan
