= Edward B. Bunn =

American Jesuit academic administrator

The Reverend Edward B. Bunn SJ
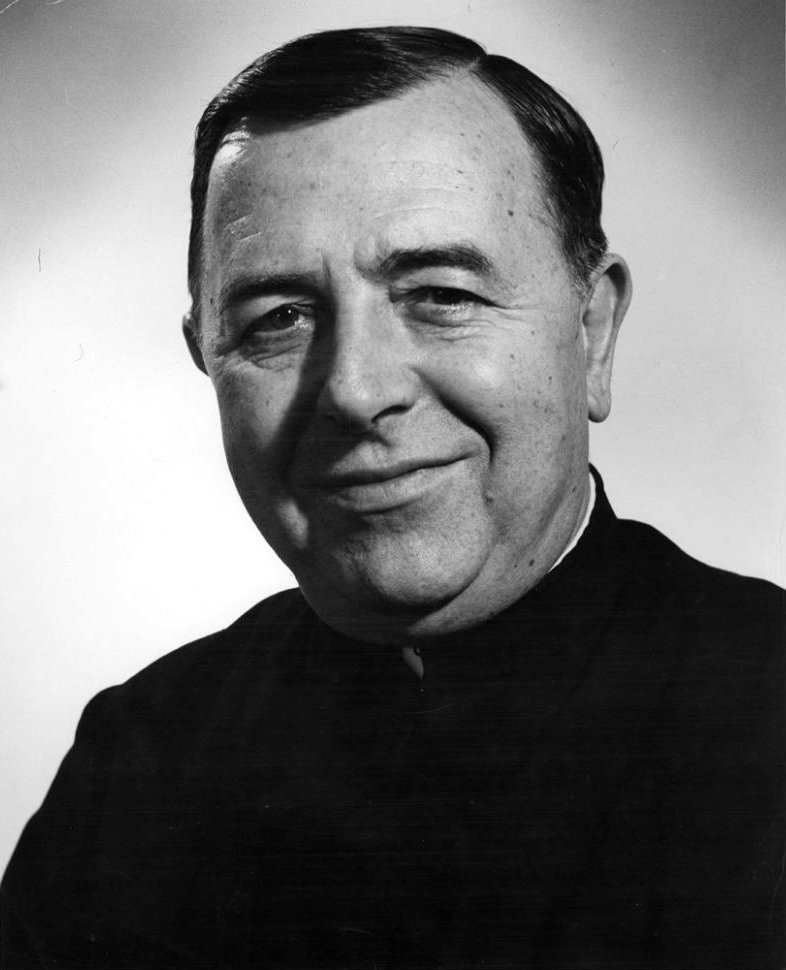

43rd President of Georgetown University
- In office 1952–1964
- Preceded by: J. Hunter Guthrie
- Succeeded by: Gerard J. Campbell

19th President of Loyola College in Maryland
- In office 1938–1947
- Preceded by: Joseph A. Canning
- Succeeded by: Francis X. Talbot

Personal details
- Born: March 15, 1896 Baltimore, Maryland, U.S.
- Died: June 18, 1972 (aged 76) Washington, D.C., U.S.
- Education: Loyola College in Maryland (BA); St. Andrew-on-Hudson (MA); Woodstock College; Pontifical Gregorian University (PhD)

Orders
- Ordination: 1929

Edward Bernard Bunn SJ (March 15, 1896 – June 18, 1972) was an American Catholic priest and Jesuit who became the president of Loyola College in Maryland and later of Georgetown University. Born in Baltimore, Maryland, he was educated at Loyola College before entering the Society of Jesus in 1919. He continued his education at St. Andrew-on-Hudson Woodstock College, and the Pontifical Gregorian University and then taught at Brooklyn Preparatory School and Canisius College.

In 1938, he became the president of Loyola College, and his term was largely defined by a protracted legal dispute with Archbishop Michael Curley of Baltimore, involving high-ranking church prelates. Bunn's term came to an end in 1947, when he was put in charge of the colleges in the Jesuits' Maryland Province. He also briefly transferred to the University of Scranton, before becoming the regent of Georgetown University's School of Dentistry and School of Nursing.

In 1952, Bunn was made the president of Georgetown University. He would become the longest-serving president in the university's history to that date and came to be described as the "founder of modern Georgetown." Bunn undertook an expansive building campaign, which produced eight new buildings, and he centralized the university's administration.

During his tenure, the School of Business, the School of Languages and Linguistics and the predecessor of the School of Continuing Studies were founded. The administration of the Georgetown University Hospital was also professionalized. Following the end of his presidency in 1964, Bunn remained at Georgetown as chancellor, where he continued to fundraise. The Edward B. Bunn, S.J. Intercultural Center at Georgetown was posthumously named in his honor.

== Early life ==
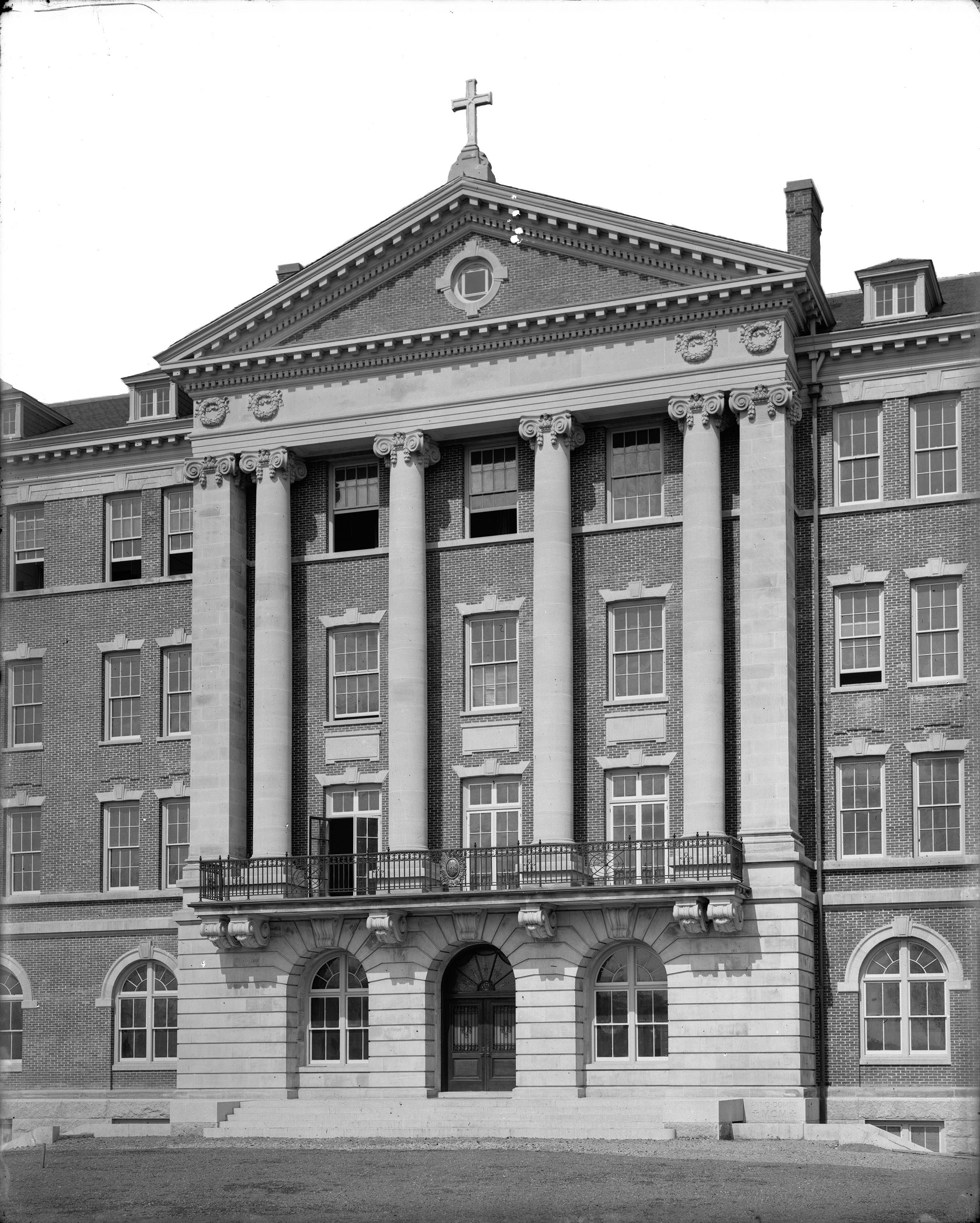
The Jesuit novitiate of St. Andrew-on-Hudson in 1920

Edward Bernard Bunn was born on March 15, 1896, in Baltimore, Maryland to Sebastian Philip and Filomena Philip née Fortmann. He attended Loyola College in Maryland, where he received a Bachelor of Arts in 1917, and was inducted into the Phi Beta Kappa honor society. He then entered the Society of Jesus in 1919. He proceeded to the Jesuit novitiate of St. Andrew-on-Hudson in New York, where he earned a Master of Arts in English, in 1921.

Immediately thereafter, Bunn began his scholasticate at Woodstock College in Maryland. His studies were punctuated by a period as professor of dramatics at Fordham University 1923 to 1926. Bunn completed his education at the Pontifical Gregorian University in Rome, receiving a Doctor of Philosophy degree in philosophy in 1930. The title of his doctoral dissertation was "The Moral Judgments of Children from 6 to 12 Years of Age". He was ordained a priest in 1929.

Following the end of his education and priestly training, Bunn became the dean of Brooklyn Preparatory School in 1930. After two years, he left to become a professor of psychology at Canisius College. Bunn remained in this position until 1935, when he transferred to Fordham as an associate professor of psychology.

== Loyola College ==
Bunn was appointed president of Loyola College in Maryland on July 31, 1938, succeeding Joseph A. Canning. He officially assumed his duties after finishing teaching the summer term at Fordham. His inauguration on October 20 was the first time Loyola held a pompous ceremony to mark such an occasion. A significant influence on his tenure was a controversy that arose between himself and the Archbishop of Baltimore, Michael Joseph Curley. In 1937, an elderly woman, Frances Stuart, inherited a sum of money from her brother on the condition that she write her will to conform with his wishes, which specified that certain Catholic institutions, including Loyola College and the Archdiocese of Baltimore, receive bequests. In 1940, Stuart had become ill and had a lawyer that Bunn recommended draft a new will for her, which eliminated the bequests to the archdiocese and several other institutions while increasing those to Loyola and Woodstock College. She died later that year.

During probate, two of her relatives filed a caveat, arguing that her second will was invalid because she was not mentally competent at the time of its creation. Archbishop Curley then entered the lawsuit, arguing Bunn had used undue influence and fraud in causing Stuart to adopt the new will. This move was highly unusual, as canon law required any Catholic suing a church official over the exercise of his ecclesial functions to bring suit in an ecclesiastical court rather than civil court. (Note: Curley avoided this provision of canon law because one of the litigants was not Catholic, and therefore, could not be bound by any ruling of a church court.) Curley declined to privately resolve the matter with Bunn or his Jesuit superiors and rejected Bunn's eventual offer to pay the archdiocese what it would have received under the original will. In 1941, several weeks before the trial, the American assistant to the Jesuit Superior General intervened by requesting Curley withdraw the suit to avoid public embarrassment for the church, in exchange for the Jesuits relinquishing their claim to the bequest entirely; Curley declined. The following month, Curley stated he would accept the offer on the condition that Bunn be removed as president of Loyola College.

Meanwhile, the controversy attracted the attention of higher prelates in the church. The Apostolic Delegate to the United States informed Curley that the pope desired to have the dispute resolved out of court. Nonetheless, Curley continued the lawsuit. The Jesuit Superior General also ruled that Bunn would not be removed as president of Loyola College. The trial began in May 1941, and, after two hours of deliberation, the jury decided that Stuart's second will was valid.

Following the end of the dispute with the archbishop, Bunn turned his attention to the physical growth of Loyola College. His plans for expansion, however, were initially thwarted by World War II. With the end of the war in 1945, the university saw a surge in the number of students. Therefore, Bunn aimed to construct a college chapel, but was unable to secure funding. Bunn's term as president came to an end at the close of the 1947 academic year, and he was succeeded by Francis X. Talbot.

== Georgetown University ==
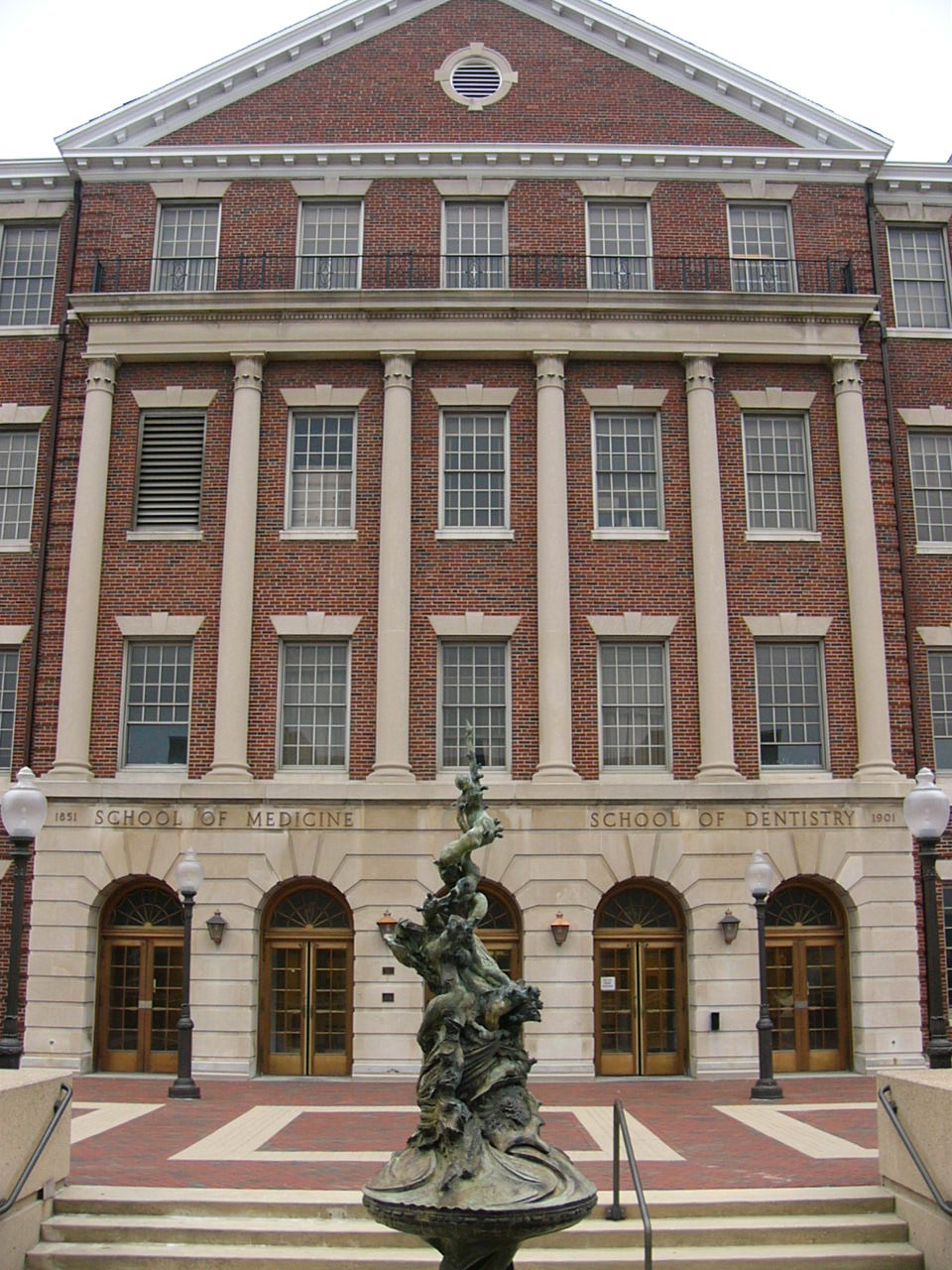
Bunn was regent of Georgetown's dental school, housed in the medical & dental building.

After leaving Loyola, Bunn was made the regional director of colleges and universities for the Jesuits' Maryland Province, a position he held until 1952. In 1947, he served a year as the assistant director of the labor school at the University of Scranton. Bunn became the regent of the School of Dentistry and School of Nursing at Georgetown University in 1948. During his regency, the dental school undertook an extensive renovation of its facilities and created children's and periodontal clinics and a diagnostic department. The X-ray department and orthodontic laboratory were also expanded. At the nursing school, he took the initial steps to transform the institution from a diploma-granting school to baccalaureate one.

=== Presidency ===
In October 1952, Bunn was named the president of Georgetown University, replacing J. Hunter Guthrie. He is remembered as one of the pivotal presidents in the university's history, and was described by one historian as the "founder of the modern Georgetown". Presiding over an era of post-World War II expansion, Bunn sought to establish Georgetown as the preeminent Catholic university in the United States. At the same time, he greatly increased its independence from the Jesuit superiors. His presidency was characterized by an overall centralization of the university's administration, which was previously carried out in large part by its constituent schools. One component of this was the creation of a central admissions process in 1963. He also consolidated many duplicate faculties maintained by the respective schools. Bunn also expanded and raised the caliber of the university's faculty, especially focusing on the natural sciences, philosophy, and theology.

Another of Bunn's goals was to raise the academic caliber of the university. One of his first tasks was the reorganization of the School of Foreign Service (SFS). The school suffered from a lack of cohesive identity and departments that were not integrated into a single curriculum. As a result, the quality of its programs and academic caliber of its students had diminished. He also removed the Institute of Languages of Linguistics to form the School of Languages and Linguistics in 1959. Its three departments of government, economics, and history were placed under the administration of Georgetown College and the Graduate School of Arts and Sciences. In 1956, the School of Foreign Service was named in honor of Edmund A. Walsh, its founder, following his death that year. By 1962, the school's academic standards had improved. Women were also admitted for the first time as day students in 1953 (while they previously could enroll in the evening division). In 1964, the university created its first study-abroad program.

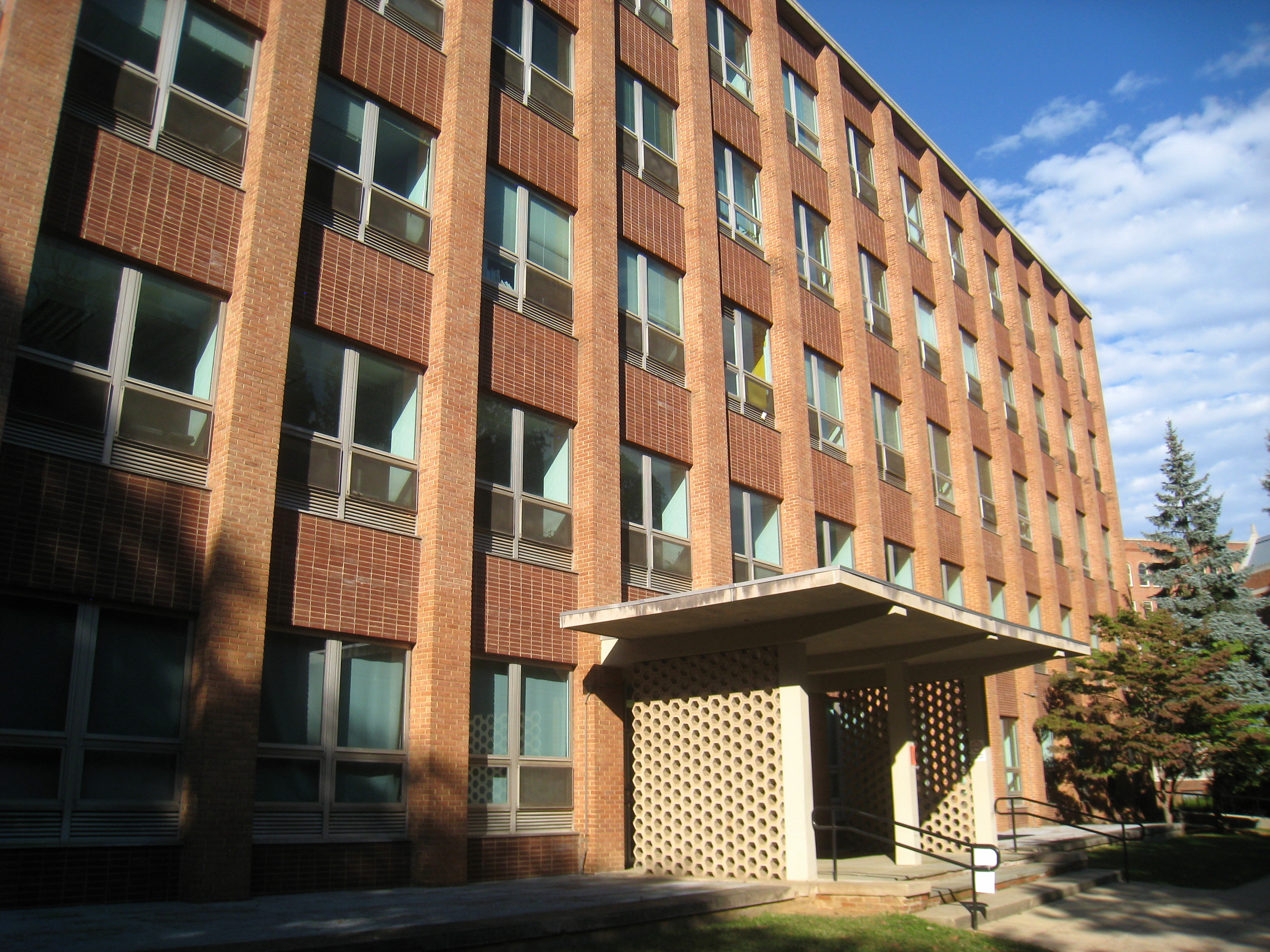
The Reiss Science Building was one of many constructed during Bunn's presidency.

With the number of SFS students studying business rapidly increasing, Bunn oversaw the separation of the Division of Business Administration to form the School of Business in 1957. The business school suffered from poor academic quality in its early years and developed a reputation among faculty and administrators as the destination of weak applicants who were unable to gain admission to Georgetown College or the SFS. Bunn even considered closing the school in 1962, but, upon the recommendation of a committee, retained it in the form of a fully independent unit of the university.

In 1953, the School of Nursing completed its conversion from a diploma-granting program to a baccalaureate one. With this saw a significant increase in the number of students and an improvement in the quality of its faculty. The Nursing School, as well as Georgetown College, also admitted black students for the first time during his tenure, joining the SFS, law, and graduate schools in enrolling black students; with this, segregation of Georgetown's schools came to an end. In 1961, the Sisters of Charity of Nazareth left the Georgetown University Hospital, and Bunn took the opportunity to professionalize administration of the hospital, which had grown considerably from its early days. The School for Summer and Continuing Education, which would later become the School of Continuing Studies, was founded in 1956.

Georgetown Law School also saw significant growth during Bunn's tenure, largely under the direction of its regent. The school changed its name to the Georgetown University Law Center in 1953, to reflect its new ambition. By the late 1950s, the law school's facilities had become overcrowded, and overtures were made to purchase additional land to expand. This would eventually culminate in a new building, after Bunn's presidency.

Bunn oversaw a period of significant construction, resulting in the opening of eight new buildings. With the changing demographics of the Georgetown neighborhood and Washington, D.C. in general, Bunn was able to purchase numerous properties in the neighborhood to expand the eastern portion of Georgetown's campus. His building campaign ended a 20-year hiatus on construction on the campus.

To support the development of new facilities, Bunn launched the Georgetown Development Campaign. Replacing the university's previous fundraising method of relying on tuition and spontaneous gifts, he was the first president to undertake large-scale, continuous fundraising. Among the buildings constructed during his presidency were St. Mary's Hall, which was initially used as housing for the nursing students; the Walsh Building, which became the original home of the School of Foreign Service; the Reiss Science Building; and the New South and Harbin dormitories.

Bunn's term as president came to an end in 1964, and he was succeeded by Gerard Campbell. At the time of his resignation, he was the longest-serving president in the university's history.

=== Later years ===
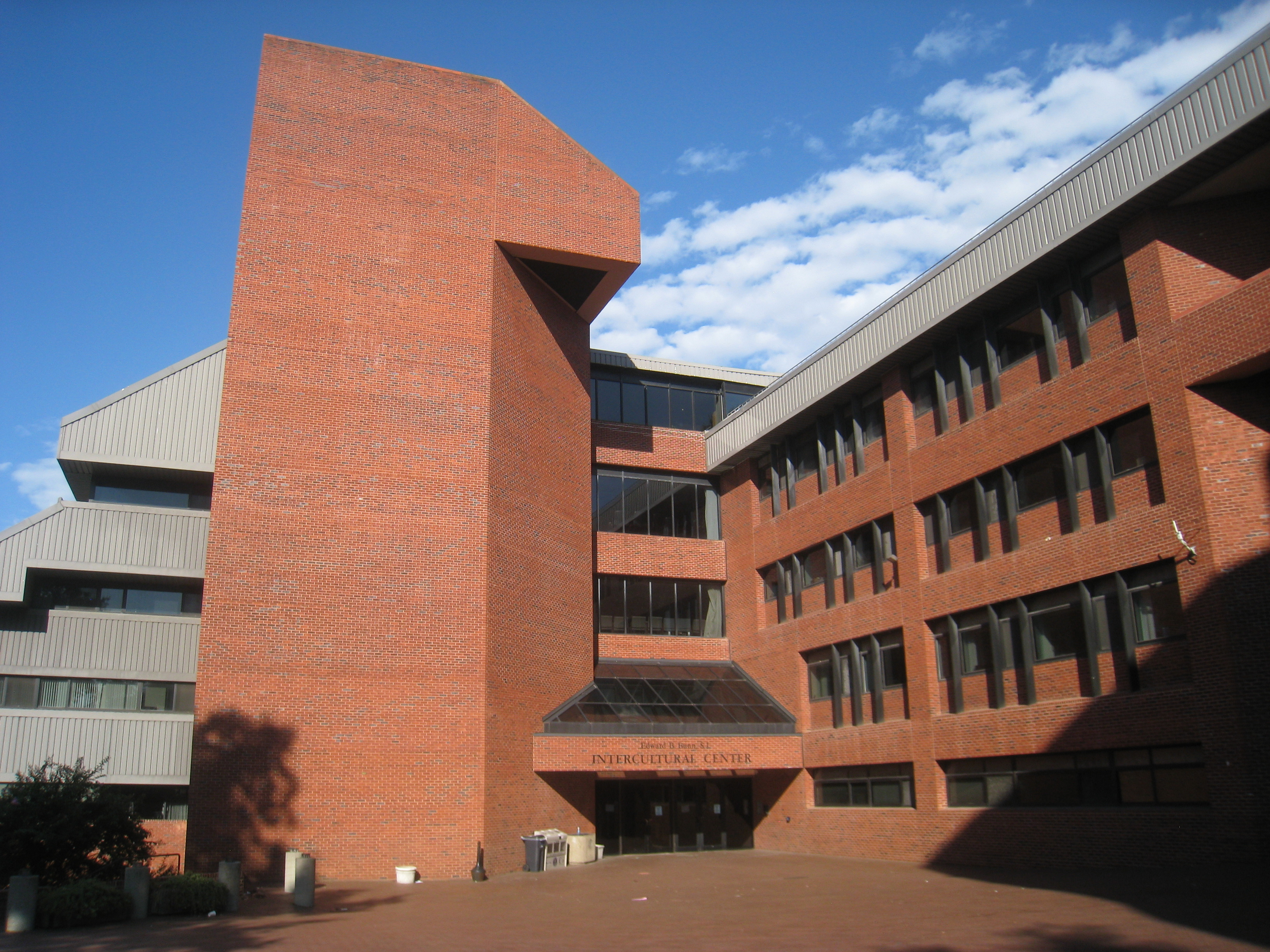
The Edward B. Bunn, S.J. Intercultural Center at Georgetown University

After his presidency, Bunn spent the rest of his life as the chancellor of Georgetown University. In this role, he spent much of his time fundraising for the university. He also partnered with the president of American University, Hurst Robins Anderson, to create a program in which students at universities in the Washington, D.C. area could take and receive academic credit for courses in any subject at member institutions. Bunn was a member of the Washington Institute of Foreign Affairs, a trustee of the Washington Center for Metropolitan Studies, a member of the Newcomen Society in North America, a member of the board of consultants of the National War College, a trustee of the Federal City Council, and the chairman of the Committee for Inter-University Cooperation in Graduate Study.

Bunn received honors from several countries. He was named a commander of the Order of Merit of the Federal Republic of Germany, was awarded the grand cross of the Order of the Sun of Peru, and the Grand Gold Merit Badge of the Republic of Austria. He was the recipient of numerous honorary degrees, including Doctor of Laws degrees from Fordham University in 1938, Brandeis University in 1958, Wheeling College in 1964, and Seattle University in 1964. He also received honorary degrees from Boston College and the University of Notre Dame.

Bunn died on June 18, 1972, at Georgetown University. The university created the Edward B. Bunn, S.J. Award for Faculty Excellence in 1967, whose recipient is chosen annually by the senior class. In 1982, the Edward B. Bunn, S.J. Intercultural Center at Georgetown was completed and named in his honor.

== Notes ==
Academic offices
Preceded by Joseph A. Canning	19th President of Loyola College in Maryland; 1938—1947	Succeeded by Francis X. Talbot
Preceded by J. Hunter Guthrie	43rd President of Georgetown University; 1952—1964	Succeeded by Gerard J. Campbell
