= Joseph A. Canning =

American Jesuit missionary and educator

The Reverend Joseph A. Canning SJ
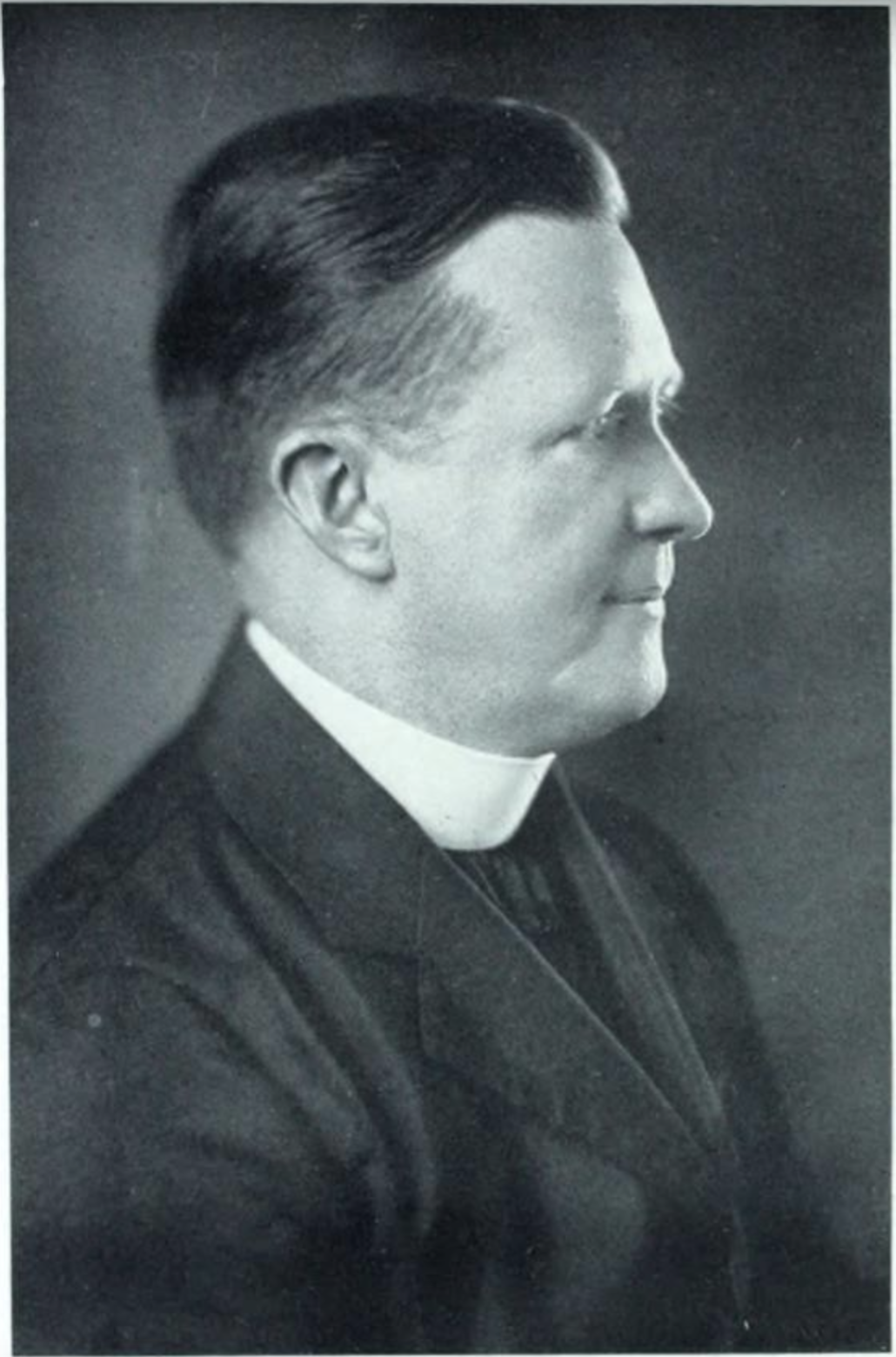
- Canning in 1927

18th President of Loyola College in Maryland
- In office 1934–1938
- Preceded by: Henri J. Wiesel
- Succeeded by: Edward B. Bunn

Personal details
- Born: October 31, 1882 New York City, U.S.
- Died: March 23, 1951 (aged 68) Jersey City, New Jersey, U.S.
- Resting place: St. Andrew-on-Hudson
- Education: St. Andrew-on-Hudson; Woodstock College

Orders
- Ordination: June 28, 1915 by James Gibbons

Joseph A. Canning SJ (October 31, 1882 – March 23, 1951) was an American Catholic priest and Jesuit. Born in New York City, he studied at St. Francis Xavier High School, before entering the Society of Jesus in 1898. He continued his studies at St. Andrew-on-Hudson and Woodstock College. He was ordained a priest in 1915, and spent the next eight years as a missionary in Jamaica.

He returned to the United States in 1925, and was an administrator and teacher at Jesuit schools in Washington, D.C., New Jersey, and Pennsylvania. In 1934, he became the president of Loyola College in Maryland. Upon the end of his term four years later, he returned to St. Peter's High School, and he died in Jersey City in 1951.

== Early life ==
Joseph A. Canning was born on October 31, 1882, in New York City. He studied at St. Francis Xavier High School in New York, before entering the Society of Jesus on August 14, 1898. He proceeded to the novitiate in Frederick, Maryland, where spent his novice and scholastic years there, with the exception of one year spent at St. Andrew-on-Hudson in Poughkeepsie, New York. He then was sent to Woodstock College in Maryland to study philosophy for three years.

Canning next taught for four years at St. Francis Xavier High School, and then for a year at the College of the Holy Cross in Worcester, Massachusetts. He then returned to Woodstock for four more years of theology. There, he was ordained by Cardinal James Gibbons as a subdeacon, deacon, and priest on June 26, 27, and 28, 1915 respectively. He celebrated his first Mass the following day. He then spent a final year at St. Andrew-on-Hudson, studying ascetical theology. He attained to the rank of gradus (Note: The culmination of a Jesuit scholastic's philosophical and theological studies was the examen ad gradum, which tested knowledge of doctrine.) in the Society of Jesus on February 2, 1918.

=== Missionary ===
In 1920, following the completion of his studies, Canning was sent to Jamaica as a missionary. For eight years, he taught at St. George College in Kingston. He also ministered at Holy Trinity Cathedral and at the military station at Port Royal.

== Academia ==
Upon his return to the United States in 1925, Canning taught at Gonzaga College High School in Washington, D.C. He then served as prefect of studies at St. Peter's High School in Jersey City, New Jersey, before returning to Gonzaga for three years. Canning became an administrator at St. Isaac Jogues Novitiate in Wernersville, Pennsylvania for two-and-a-half years, before transferring to St. Francis Xavier High School in February 1934.

On September 2, 1934, Canning became president of Loyola College in Maryland, succeeding Henri J. Wiesel. His term as president came to an end in 1938, and he was succeeded by Edward B. Bunn.

Following the end of his presidency, he returned to St. Peter's High School in Jersey City, where he became spiritual director for the Jesuit community there. He also served as a parish priest at St. Peter's Catholic Church. Canning died in Jersey City on March 23, 1951. His funeral was held on March 26, and was attended by Thomas J. Murry, the president of Loyola College, on behalf of the school.

== Notes ==
Academic offices
Preceded by Henri J. Wiesel	18th President of Loyola College in Maryland; 1934–1938	Succeeded by Edward B. Bunn
