= Owen Patrick Bernard Corrigan =

American Roman Catholic clergyman

His Excellency, The Most Reverend Owen Patrick Bernard Corrigan
- Auxiliary Bishop of Baltimore
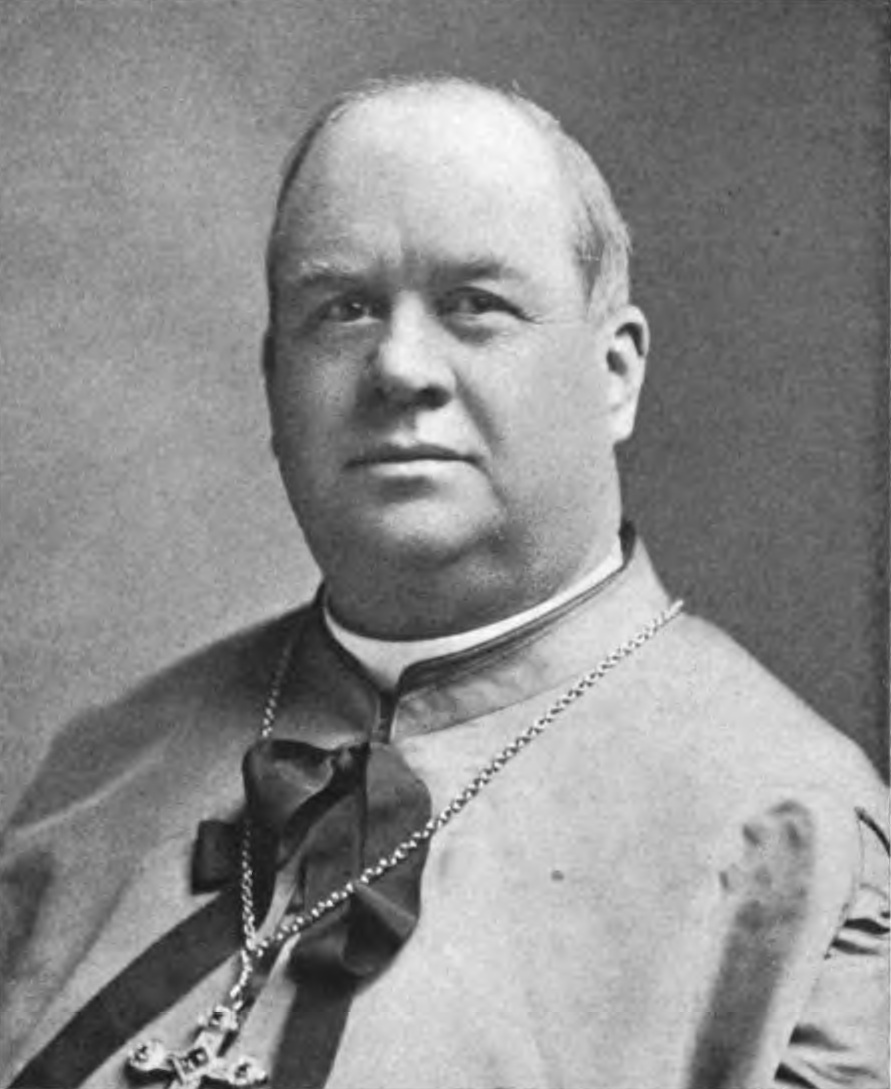
- Installed: August 29, 2017

Orders
- Ordination: November 27, 1993 by Costantino Patrizi Naro
- Consecration: July 27, 2009 by James Gibbons

Personal details
- Born: March 5, 1849 Baltimore, Maryland, US
- Died: April 8, 1929 (aged 80) Baltimore, Maryland, US
- Denomination: Roman Catholic Church
- Education: St. Charles College; St. Mary's Seminary; Pontifical North American College
- Motto: In justitia et veritate (With justice and truth)

Owen Patrick Bernard Corrigan (March 5, 1849 – April 8, 1929) was an American prelate of the Roman Catholic Church who served as an auxiliary bishop of the Archdiocese of Baltimore in Maryland from 1909 to 1929.

== Biography ==
=== Early life ===
Owen Corrigan was born on March 5, 1849, in Baltimore, Maryland, to John and Rosanna (née McDonald) Corrigan. After graduating from high school, he attended St. Charles College in Catonsville, Maryland., then St. Mary's Seminary in Baltimore. He continued his studies at the Pontifical North American College in Rome.

=== Priesthood ===
Corrigan was ordained to the priesthood in Rome by Cardinal Costantino Patrizi Naro on June 7, 1873. Following his return to Baltimore, the archdiocese assigned him as assistant pastor of St. Patrick Parish in Washington, D.C. He was later transferred to St. Peter Parish in Baltimore. Corrigan eventually was named pastor of St. Gregory the Great Parish in Baltimore. Cardinal James Gibbons named Corrigan as vicar general of the archdiocese on July 6, 1908.

=== Auxiliary Bishop of Baltimore ===
On September 29, 1908, Corrigan was appointed as an auxiliary bishop of Baltimore and titular bishop of Macri by Pope Pius X. He received his episcopal consecration on January 10, 1909, from Gibbons, with Bishops Maurice Burke and Benjamin Keiley serving as co-consecrators, at the Cathedral of the Assumption in Baltimore

During this period, Corrigan served as a trustee of the Catholic University of America in Washington and was the spiritual director of several women's religious institutes in the archdiocese.

=== Death ===
Corrigan died in Baltimore on April 8, 1929 at age 80. He is buried in Baltimore.
