= Edward B. Bunn, S.J. Intercultural Center =

The Edward B. Bunn, S.J. Intercultural Center
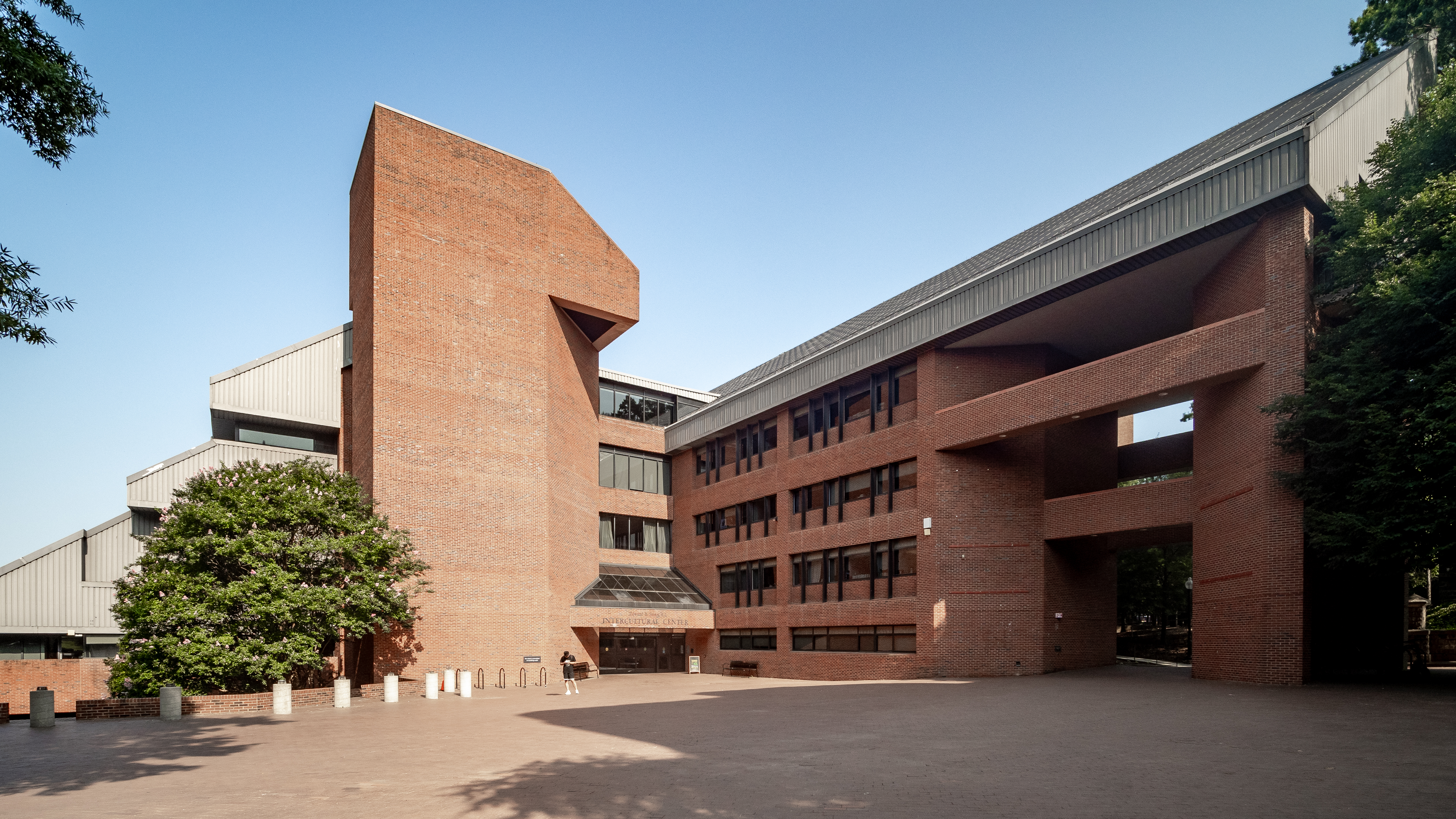
- Eastern entrance
- Interactive map of the The Edward B. Bunn, S.J. Intercultural Center area
- Alternative names: ICC

General information
- Type: Administrative office
- Architectural style: Contemporary
- Location: 37th and O Streets NW, Washington, D.C. 20057
- Coordinates: 38.90881°N 77.07338°W
- Construction started: 1980
- Completed: May 1982
- Cost: $33,000,000
- Client: Georgetown University

Technical details
- Floor count: 7
- Floor area: 226,000 square feet (21,000 m^{2})

Design and construction
- Architecture firm: Metcalf & Associates
- Structural engineer: MMP International Inc.
- Main contractor: The George Hyman Construction Co.

The Edward B. Bunn, S.J. Intercultural Center commonly known as the Intercultural Center or ICC is a seven-story mixed use building on the main campus of Georgetown University named for Edward B. Bunn. The center was built in 1982 as the Photovoltaic Higher Education National Exemplar Facility in conjunction with a grant from the U.S. Department of Energy.

The facility hosts numerous administrative offices, student facilities, and conference spaces, but is best known for its contribution to solar power development. Among the occupants of the building are the Edmund A. Walsh School of Foreign Service, the Center for Contemporary Arab Studies, the Prince Alwaleed Bin Talal Center for Muslim-Christian Understanding, and several departments of Georgetown College.

== History ==
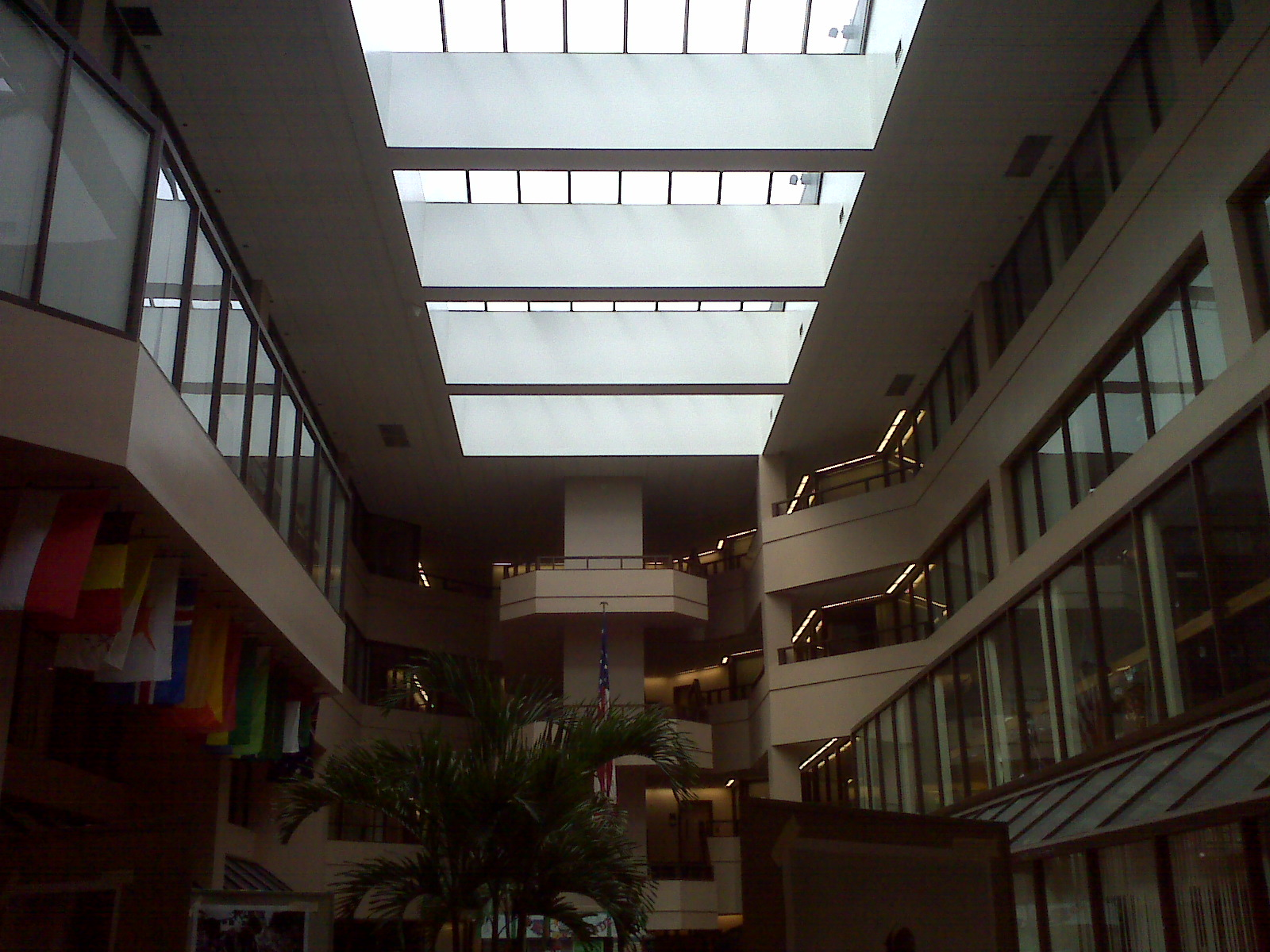
The interior of the center.

In 1980, Georgetown University applied to the Department of Energy for a grant to fund the construction of an intercultural center that would showcase the potential use building integration of photovoltaic panels to produce electrical power. While the Congressional funding for the solar panels came as a result of heightened awareness of energy issues following the 1973 oil embargo, the funding for the structure itself came as a result of Georgetown's goal of improving American education in foreign languages and international affairs, which was deemed deficient in the post-Vietnam era. This was part of Georgetown's effort at the time to secure federal funding for model projects that could be replicated at other universities and institutions across the nation.

Construction began in early 1980 and the building itself was completed in May 1982 at a cost of $23,000,000. The interior of the building consists of six floors of educational space and a seventh maintenance floor, altogether totaling 226,000 square feet (21,000 m^{2}). While at the time the center was considered futuristic, a "dark spaceship" on the historic campus, it has since become incorporated into the campus with its Red Square courtyard serving as a student gathering area.

== Solar panels ==
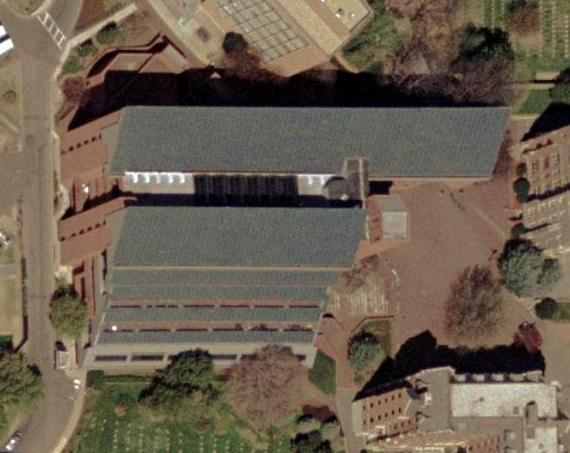
An aerial view of the center.

In its original plans it would have been the largest photovoltaic installation in the world and as completed was one of the largest ever constructed. At its peak it produced 360,000 kilowatt-hours (1.3×10^{9} kJ) per year of electrical power, however with age, its current generation is approximately 200,000 kilowatt-hours (720,000,000 kJ) per year, or 6% of the structure's needs. Additionally, the solar panels that were installed used a rough glass that reduced efficiency, but prevented glare from affecting airplanes operating out of nearby Reagan National Airport.

While it had been designed with the installation of solar panels in mind, they were not installed until late 1984 by the Solarex Corporation at a cost of approximately $10,000,000. Solarex installed the 35,710 square feet (3,318 m^{2}) of solar panels on the roof of the center facing south. Solarex was later purchased by the Amoco oil company and sold in 1995 to the Enron energy company. The center has been recognized as being ahead of its time in the promotion of renewable energy sources and for continuing to operate as designed, decades after its construction.
