= University of Scranton buildings and landmarks =

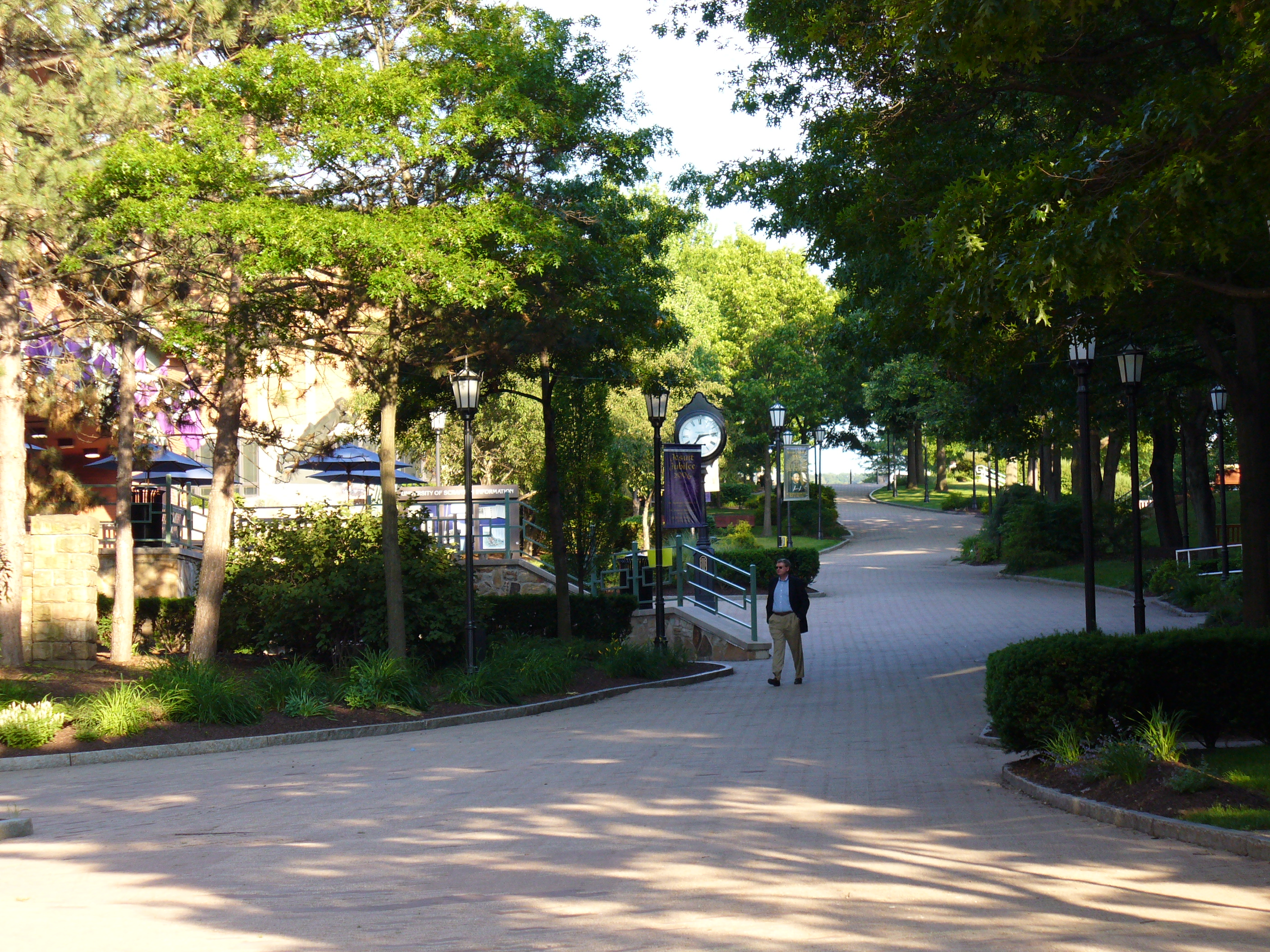
The Commons, a brick walkway that runs through the center of the University of Scranton

The University of Scranton, built on a 58-acre campus, is located in the city of Scranton, Pennsylvania. The campus serves a community of 75,000 people within the greater metropolitan area Since gaining university status in 1938, the institution has undertaken over 50 renovation projects. More than $240 million has been spent on new construction, including the Loyola Science Center, DeNaples Center, Pilarz and Montrone Halls, Condron Hall, Edward R. Leahy, Jr. Hall, and the Dionne Green locations.

== The Harry and Jeanette Weinberg Memorial Library ==
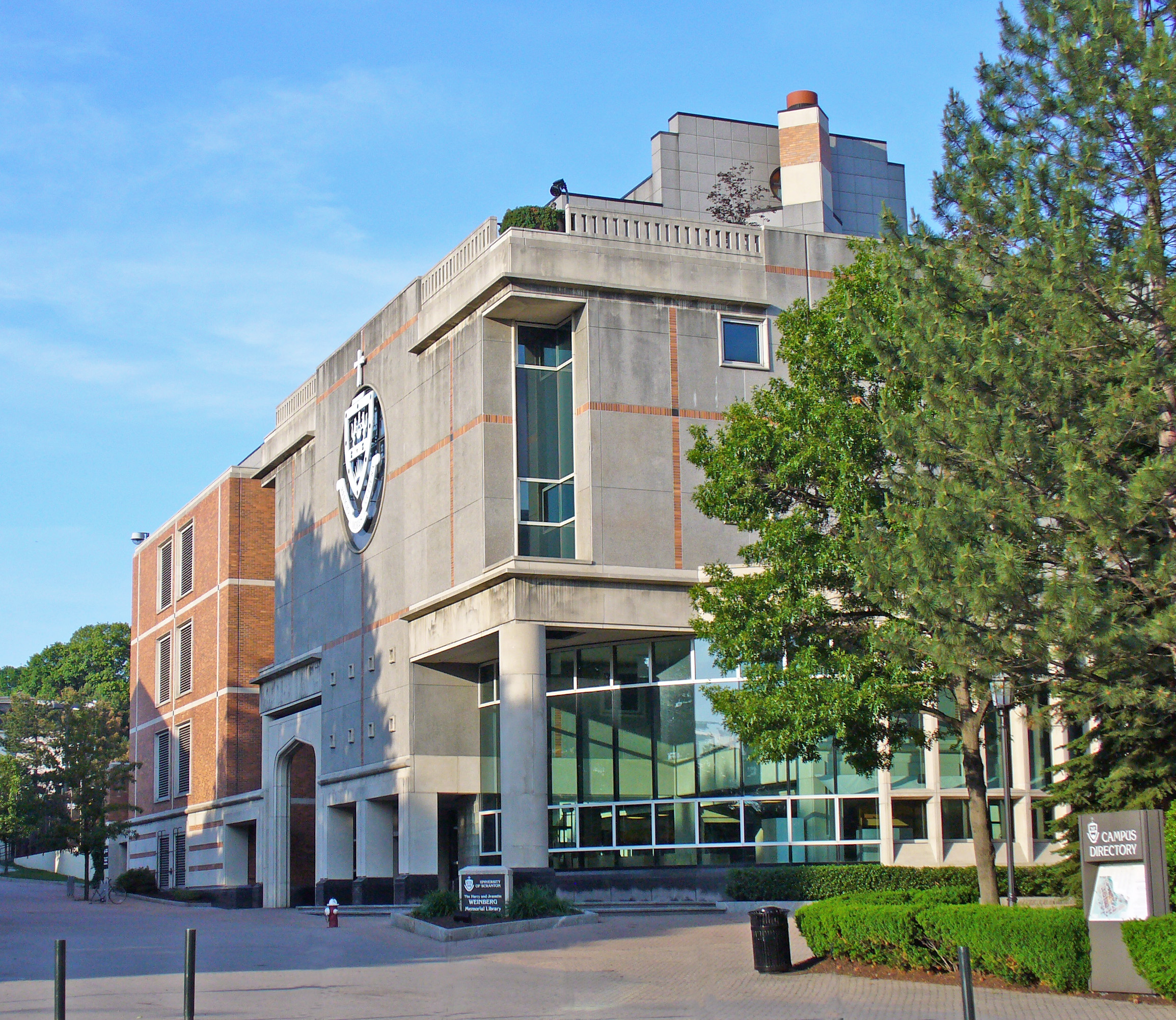
The Harry and Jeanette Weinberg Memorial Library

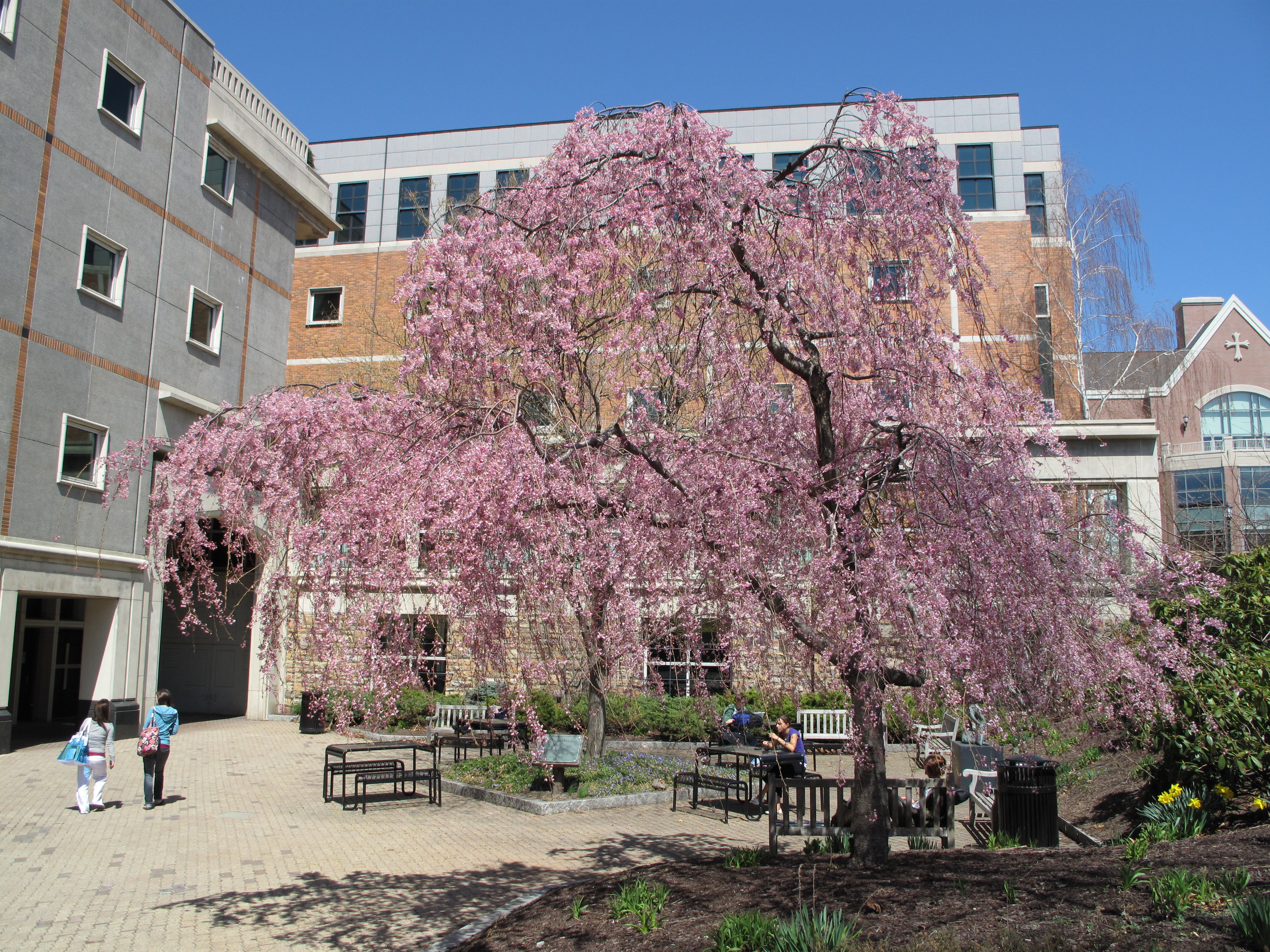
Spring at the Weinberg Memorial Library

Completed in 1992, the Harry and Jeanette Weinberg Memorial Library was designed to replace the Alumni Memorial Library as the student body and the library's holdings grew. The Weinberg Memorial Library has a seating capacity of up to 1000. The library currently houses 473,830 volumes, more than 15,500 electronic journals, 562,368 pieces of microform, and 1,709 current and archived periodical subscriptions. It is also home to the University Archives and Special Collections, which features many rare books, as well as university records. The third floor houses several administrative offices and features two large classrooms that educate users about the library and its services. The fourth floor has a large reading room featuring a stained glass window. The fifth floor is the Scranton Heritage Room, a large open hall that features 39 panel paintings by Trevor Southey depicting art, religion, and science in the Lackawanna Valley and the world.

Renovations at the Library include the opening of multiple 24-hour study rooms, including the Pro Deo Room, the Reilly Learning Commons, and, most recently, the entire second floor. The Pro Deo Room contains a computer lab with networked PCs, two laser printers, a vending machine area, and a Java City Café.

In order to raise the $13.3 million needed to build the Library, the University of Scranton launched the "Gateway to the Future" Fundraising Campaign. In late 1989, Harry Weinberg, a former Scranton businessman and long-time benefactor of the University of Scranton, made significant headway in the fundraising goal by announcing a six million dollar donation to the university from the Harry and Jeanette Weinberg Foundation, with five million dollars going to the library and the other one million going to the school's Judaic Studies Institute. In order to honor the significant contribution of Mr. Weinberg, the new library was named for him and his wife.

Before becoming home to the Weinberg Memorial Library, the site had once belonged to Worthington Scranton where he lived until moving to the estate in 1899. His previous house was converted into the Hahneman Hospital until it relocated in 1906 to the current Community Medical Center site. In 1941, Scranton donated the land to the university. In the 1950s, the site held the A Building barracks, which were purchased by the university in order to accommodate increased enrollment due to the GI Bill which were used as classrooms and offices, until they were demolished in 1962. Until the construction of the Weinberg Memorial Library in the 1990s, the site housed asphalt playing courts.

== Patrick and Margaret DeNaples Center ==
On January 31, 2006, the university announced plans for the DeNaples Center, a new $30,000,000 campus center that would replace Gunster Memorial Student Center and mark the university's most ambitious project in its 118-year history. In the four decades since Gunster had been constructed in 1960, the University of Scranton, as University President Father Pilarz said, "has evolved into a broadly regional, comprehensive institution with students coming from more than 30 states and more than 35 countries," and thus "has simply outgrown the 77,000 square foot Gunster Center, which was built for a time when only 228 of our total student enrollment of 2,300 lived on campus."

The first floor of the building includes a grand lobby, the campus bookstore, the student mail center, commuter lockers, a Provisions on Demand (P.O.D.) convenience and the DeNaples Food Court, a retail dining option with seating for 250, which includes StarbucksCoffee, Chick-fil-A, and Quiznos among other options. The second floor offers a fireplace lounge, offices for Student Affairs, University Ministries and the Student Forum. The Student Forum contains a computer lab for students to use, as well as student space with couches and tables. The Student Forum is home to the Center for Student Engagement, including the offices for the University of Scranton Programming Board (USPB), the Aquinas newspaper, the Windhover yearbook, the Jane Kopas Women's Center, the Multicultural Center, Student Government, and Community Outreach. The third floor serves as the primary dining space in the building and has seating for 800. The fourth floor includes a subdividable 7,000 sq. ft. ballroom with dinner seating for 425 and lecture seating for more than 700 and three multipurpose meeting rooms as well as the Ann and Leo Moscovitz Theater. On September 13, 2009, the fourth floor ballroom was dedicated in honor of Rev. Bernard R. McIllhenny, S.J., who served as headmaster at Scranton Prep from 1958 to 1966 and dean of admissions at the university from 1966 to 1997.

The DeNaples Center was the first building on campus designed and constructed to achieve the LEED certification as part of the university's Sustainability initiatives, which it received in February 2009. LEED stands for Leadership in Energy and Environmental Design, a cutting-edge system for certifying design, construction and operations of "green" buildings, coordinated by the U.S. Green Building Council.

The DeNaples Center is named in honor of the late Patrick and Margaret DeNaples, the parents of Louis DeNaples Sr., a local business owner, active community volunteer and philanthropist, former university board member, and reputed organized crime associate. The DeNaples Center was dedicated in February 2008. Upon the completion and opening of the DeNaples Center, the Gunster Memorial Student Center was demolished and was replaced by the Dionne Green, a large green space located directly in front of the DeNaples Center.

== University Commons ==
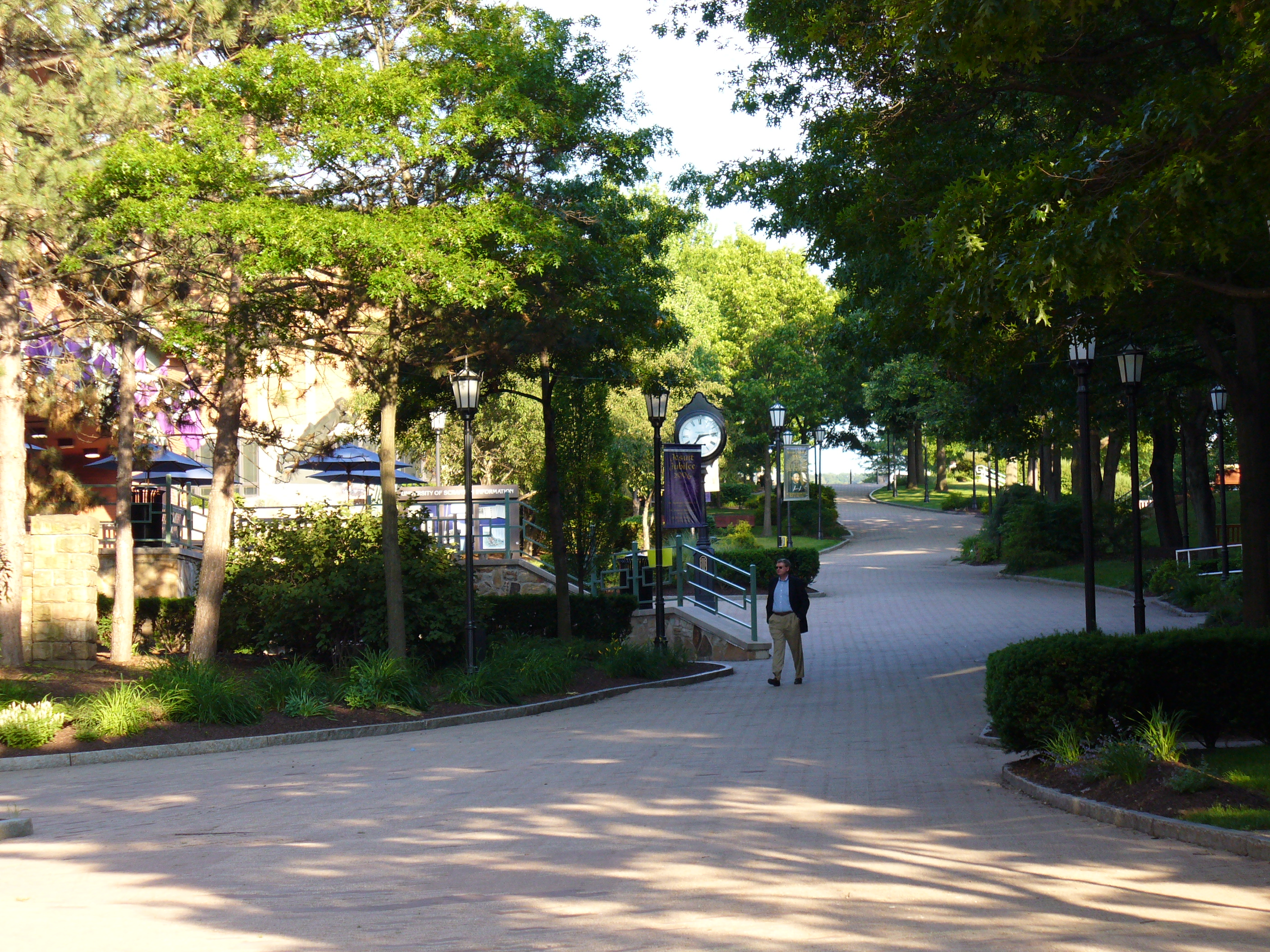
The Commons, a brick walkway that runs through the center of The University of Scranton

For 25 years, there had been an effort by the University of Scranton to close the 900 and 1000 blocks of Linden Street which ran through the school's campus. In 1980, the improvement project was actualized. The Commons project was intended to create a more attractive, park-like atmosphere on the campus and to eliminate the safety hazards associated with pedestrian and vehicle traffic. With that new space, the university hoped to create a 20-foot-wide brick walkway, trees, benches, a water fountain, and patio area in addition to developing the area with landscaping.

The University Commons proposal was approved by the Scranton City Council on December 20, 1978. Construction on the project was begun on June 2, 1980, as parts of Linden Street were removed. The project was completed around November 1980 and dedication ceremonies were held in December 1980. Currently, it serves as the main walkway through the university's campus.

=== Royal Way ===
In 1991, the University Commons was extended on the 300 block of Quincy Avenue between Linden and Mulberry Streets, which had been closed to vehicular traffic and owned by the university since 1987. This pedestrian pathway, named Royal Way, serves as an official entrance to the university and the GLM (Gannon-Lavis-McCormick) student residences.

At the time of its construction, the 24-foot-wide Royal Way was paved in z-brick and featured landscaping with trees and shrubs. The Mulberry Street entrance to the Royal Way featured a campus gate, a gift from the University of Scranton Classes of 1985, 1990 and 1991, and the opposing terminus was Metanoia, the bronze sculpture of St. Ignatius by Gerard Baut. The sculpture has since been moved to the opposite side of the University Commons, in front of the Long Center.

== Current academic buildings ==
=== Alumni Memorial Hall ===
Many of the university's College of Arts & Sciences' buildings seen from Father Pantle's Rose Garden

Completed in 1960, the two-story building, formerly called Alumni Memorial Library, was designed to hold 150,000 volumes; the collection at the time numbered approximately 62,000 volumes. It also had study space for approximately 500 students. The split-level design also included conference rooms, a music room, a visual aid room, microfilm facilities, and a smoking lounge. The buff iron-spot building was considered cutting edge at the time, with glare-reducing thermo-pane glass, noise-reducing solid brick walls, radiant heating and cooling, and humidity control. Although originally estimated at $750,000, overall construction costs were approximately $806,000 after complications occurred when a massive mining cavity, complete with a network of surrounding tunnels, was discovered to lie only forty feet below the surface of the building site. Using a digging rig brought in from Texas, contractors sunk 33 steel casings into the ground, each more than 40 feet long, and then poured concrete through them to form pillars in order to support the structure. To raise money for the construction, a fundraising campaign led by Judge James F. Brady sought individual contributions from each of the university's alumni.

The building was extensively renovated in 1993 after the completion of the new Weinberg Memorial Library. No longer needed to house the university's book collection or to serve as a study space for students, Alumni Memorial Hall was converted to house the Psychology Department on the second floor, which had formerly been located in O’Hara Hall, as well as the Division of Planning and Information Resources, which was formerly known as the University Computing and Data Services Center. The new location in Alumni Memorial Hall "significantly enhance[d] educational and research facilities" for the Psychology Department, as John Norcross, chairman of the Psychology Department, remarked.

=== Brennan Hall ===
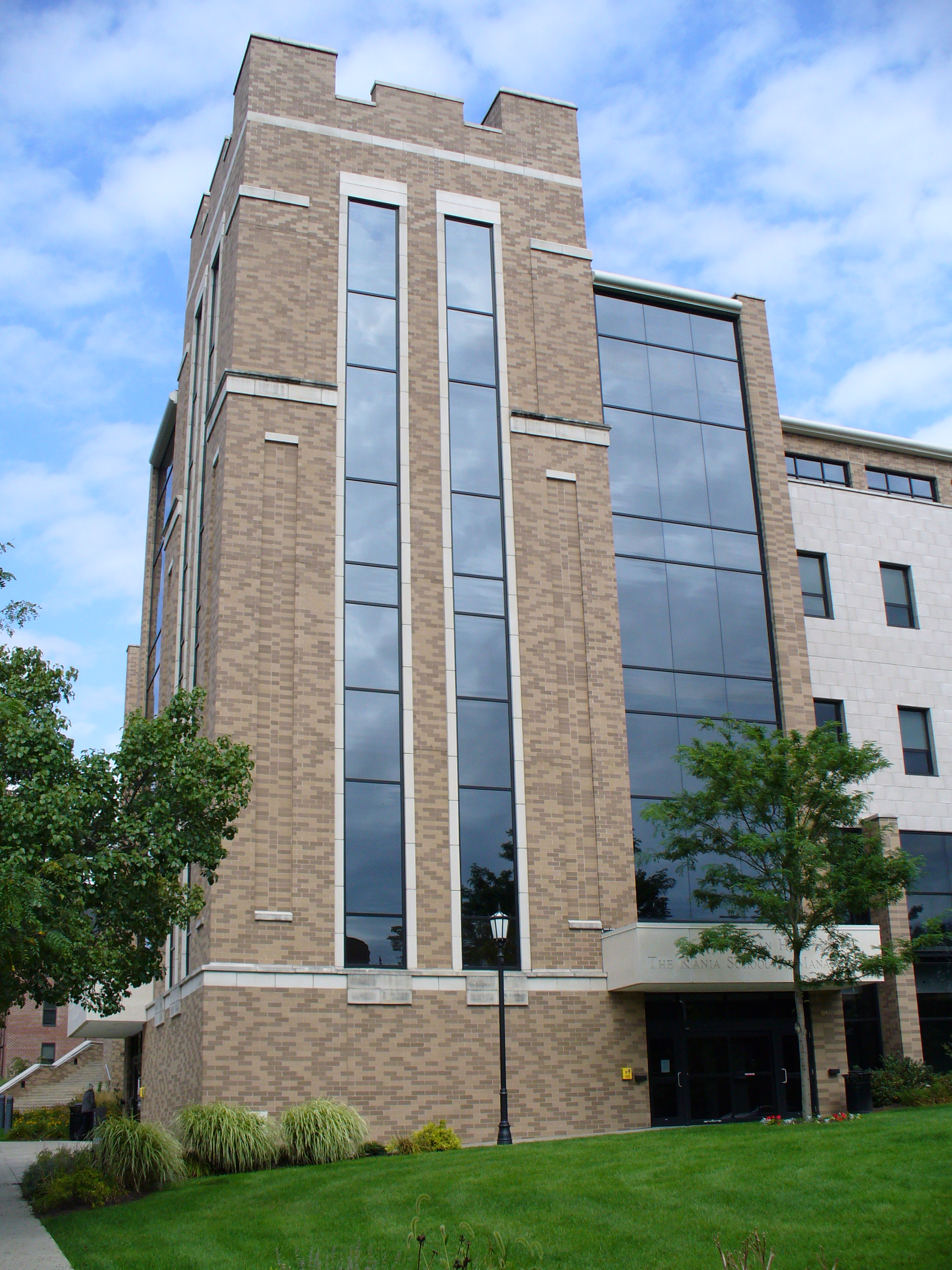
Brennan Hall, completed in 2000

Completed in 2000, Brennan Hall houses the departments of the Arthur J. Kania School of Management, or KSOM. The five-story, 71,000-square-foot building, located on the east side of Madison Avenue, features nine classrooms, seminar rooms, offices, a 140-seat auditorium, a quiet study area, an advising center, board rooms, and an Executive Education Center.

The classrooms are located on the first two floors of Brennan Hall. Two of the nine classrooms are two tiered case-study rooms equipped for video teleconferencing. Two other classrooms are computers rooms, while the rest are traditional classrooms. In 2008, the university dedicated one of Brennan Hall's classrooms. The Jack and Jean Blackledge Sweeney Classroom on the first floor honors Jack Sweeney '61, the retired president and co-founder of Special Defense Systems in Dunmore, a member of the Pride, Passion, Promise Campaign Executive Committee, and an active University of Scranton alumni.

The first floor also contains the Irwin E. Alperin Financial Center, which was opened in 2007. The Alperin Center was designed to simulate a stock market trading floor, complete with an electronic ticker and data displays, 40 computers, a surround sound system, conference facilities, and a network of specialized software-designed to support the Kania School business curriculum with simulation capabilities and faculty-student research on financial and commodity markets.

The third and fourth floors house faculty offices, departmental offices, the dean's office, and conference rooms. There is a behavioral lab for teaching and research purposes, meeting and storage places for clubs and an MBA lounge that will include locker space for master's degree students.

The fifth floor houses the Executive Education Center. The Executive Center includes five main areas: a dining room, a board room, a meeting room, a large reception area, and an auditorium on the second floor. The Executive Education Center provides technologically advanced conference space for the university, and businesses and organizations throughout Northeastern Pennsylvania.

In 2005, it was named the Joseph M. McShane, S.J., Executive Center. The Pearn Auditorium, which seats 140, serves as a gathering space for various lectures, presentations and community events. Dedicated in 2008, the James F. Pearn Auditorium on the second floor of Brennan Hall is named for the late father of Frank Pearn ‘83, the chief administrative officer of the Mergers and Acquisitions Division of Lehman Brothers, the chair of the university's Economic Strength Committee of the board of trustees, and a member of the Campaign Executive Committee. Dedicated in 2008, the Rose Room, located on the fifth floor of Brennan Hall, is used for lectures, dinners, luncheons, seminars, and other campus events. It can accommodate more than 200 people. It honors Harry Rose '65, the president and chief executive officer of The Rose Group, a restaurant management company, a member of the university's board of trustees, and a member of the Campaign Executive Committee. The Executive Center also contains a 50-seat board room which is used by various governing boards of the university, including the board of trustees, University Council and University Senate. In 2003, the University of Scranton named the board room in honor of PNC Bank to recognize a significant grant from the PNC Foundation for the construction of Brennan Hall and to acknowledge the support PNC has consistently provided to the university. Additional facilities of the Executive Center, which is available to organizations outside the university, include a lobby and reception area, and a meeting room accommodating 20 people.

Financed by the Campaign of Scranton, a $35 million capital fundraising effort, Brennan Hall cost $11.5 million to construct. The funds raised to build Brennan Hall included a $3.5 million gift from alumnus John E. Brennan ‘68 and $1 million of a $4 million gift from alumnus Arthur J. Kania ‘53, for whom the School of Management is named, with additional Campaign funds coming from alumni, friends of the university, corporations, and foundations.

In order to recognize Brennan's generous contribution to the university, the new building was named in his honor. John E. Brennan is the president of Activated Communications, New York City; a director and vice-chairman of the Board of Southern Union Company; a member of the board of directors for Spectrum Signal Processing; and a founder of Metro Mobile CTS, Inc., and served as its president and chief operating officer until its sale to Bell Atlantic Corp.

=== Ciszek Hall ===
Ciszek Hall, formerly known as the Center for Eastern Christian Studies, was built as an ecumenical and academic institute designed to promote knowledge about and understanding of the religious and cultural traditions of Eastern Christianity. In addition to the Byzantine Rite chapel in the building, the center was designed to house a 15,000-volume library, office, social area, and a cloister garden. Construction was begun in 1987 and completed later that year. The Center for Eastern Christian Studies was renamed Ciszek in 2005 in the memory of Fr. Walter Ciszek, S.J., a native of northeastern Pennsylvania and a candidate for sainthood who spent twenty-three years ministering in Soviet prisons and the labor camps of Siberia. Currently, Cisek Hall houses the university's Office of Career Services, a chapel which celebrates service in the Byzantine Rite, and a library containing 15,000 books.

=== Edward R. Leahy, Jr. Hall ===
In November 2013, the university broke ground on its newest building, the 111,500-square-foot, eight-story rehabilitation center designed to house the departments of Exercise Science, Occupational Therapy, and Physical Therapy. Leahy Hall contains 25 interactive rehabilitation laboratories, 9 traditional and active-learning classrooms, research facilities, multiple simulation environments, more than 50 faculty offices, and 9 group study rooms. A unified entrance for Leahy Hall and McGurrin Hall was also created, in order to promote and allow interaction between the various departments in the Panuska College of Professional Studies, the rest of which, including Nursing, Education, Counseling & Human Services, Health Administration and Human Resources, are housed in McGurrin Hall. At 140 feet, it is now the tallest building on the university campus. The building was designed for and was constructed in accordance with Leadership in Energy and Environmental Design (LEED) standards for certification.

Leahy Hall contains 25 different laboratories, including three pediatric laboratories, focused on the physical, mental and emotional development of children. Some of its laboratories are the Human Motion Laboratory, the Strength Laboratory, the Physiology Laboratory, the Human Anatomy Laboratory, the Active Learning Laboratory, the Body Composition Laboratory, the Therapeutic Modalities and Orthopedic Physical Therapy Laboratory, the Rehabilitation and Neurological Physical Therapy Laboratory, the Pediatrics Gross Motor Laboratory, the Kinesiology and Physical Rehabilitation Occupational Therapy Laboratory, the Occupational Performance Laboratory, the Hand and Rehabilitation Laboratory, and the Pediatric and Rehabilitation Suite containing the Gross Motor Rehabilitation Lab, Fine Motor Rehabilitation Lab, and the Sensory/Snoezelen Room.

Leahy Hall is located on the former site of the Scranton chapter of the Young Women's Christian Association, on the southwest corner of Jefferson Avenue and Linden Street. Originally constructed in 1907 and purchased by the University of Scranton in 1976, the YWCA was transformed into Jefferson Hall, serving as an off-campus residence for university students until the building was converted into old Leahy Hall in 1984, used to house facilities for the university's Physical Therapy and Occupational Therapy departments.

Leahy Hall opened for the Fall 2015 semester and was dedicated on September 18, 2015, as Edward R. Leahy, Jr. Hall, bearing the same name as the hall it replaced to recognize and honor the Leahy family for their service to the university, particularly in their endowment of health care education, dating back to the early 1990s. The son of Edward and Patricia Leahy, Edward R. Leahy, Jr., was born in 1984 with cerebral palsy and several related disabilities. He died shortly before his ninth birthday in 1993.

=== The Houlihan-McLean Center ===
In 1986, the University of Scranton acquired the former Immanuel Baptist Church at the corner of Jefferson Avenue and Mulberry Street in order to house the school's Performance Music Program, which includes the university's orchestra, bands, and singers, as well as to serve as a site for musical and other arts performances, lectures, and special liturgies. The church was built in 1909 in the Victorian Gothic style. In 1984, the church was vacated when the congregation merged with the Bethany and Green Ridge Baptist churches before being acquired by the University of Scranton. After its purchase by the university, the building underwent extensive renovations and restoration, including plaster repair and floor refinishing, painting and carpeting, extension of the stage, electrical re-wiring, new lighting, a new sound system, refurbishing the organ, pressure cleaning and restoration of the building's masonry, and the installation of a new roof.

The main floor of the building houses the Aula, a concert hall which can seat approximately 650 people; the Atrium, a large space which can be used as a recital, reception, or lecture hall that can seat 400 people and formerly served as the church's Sunday School; the Wycliffe A. Gordon Guest Artist Hospitality Suite, and the sound control room. The ground floor of the building includes a large rehearsal hall, small ensembles areas, a musicians' lounge, practice rooms, offices, music library, and secure instrument storage and repair areas. The Nelhybel Collection Research Room is on the top floor, along with the organ loft and organ chamber. Houlihan-McLean features an historic 1910 Austin Opus 301 symphonic pipe organ, one of only a few surviving examples of early 20th-century organ building. The 3,157 pipes, which include some as large as 17 feet long which weigh 200 pounds and others which are smaller than a pencil, were transported to Stowe, Pennsylvania to be cleaned and repaired by specialists at Patrick J. Murphy & Associates, Inc.

The Houlihan-McLean Center also has a bell tower which holds a large bell, forged in 1883 by the Buckeye Bell Foundry and Van Duzen and Tift, Cincinnati, Ohio, and installed by the Immanuel Baptist congregation in the church when the Church moved into the current Houlihan-McLean Center from its former location. The bell's inscription reads, "Presented by the Choir in Memory of Mrs. C. F. Whittemore, Who Died July 7, 1883." In 1991, the university installed an electronic bell ringer, programmed to ring the bell every hour using a motor and hammer manufactured in England.

The building is named for Atty. Daniel J. Houlihan and Prof. John P. McLean, two dedicated, longtime faculty members at the university. A former student of theirs was the benefactor whose contribution, made in their honor, enabled the university to acquire the structure in 1986.

The Houlihan McLean Center is one of three churches the university acquired and preserved during the 1980s once their congregations were no longer able to maintain the buildings. In 1985, the university converted the former Assembly of God Church at 419 Monroe Avenue into Rev. Joseph A. Rock, S.J., Hall. It currently houses Madonna Della Strada Chapel, the principal campus setting for university liturgies, as well as the university's Military Science department and ROTC program. In 1986, the university acquired the Immanuel Baptist Church and converted it into the Houlihan McLean center. Currently, it houses the university's Performance Music Programs. The university acquired the former John Raymond Memorial Church, Madison Avenue and Vine Street, in 1987. It now serves as the Smurfit Arts Center, which houses studio space for the university's Fine Arts department. The university's efforts were cited in a 1988 edition of Inspired, a bi-monthly publication devoted to the preservation of historic religious buildings.

=== Hyland Hall ===
Completed in 1987, Kathryn and Bernard Hyland Hall is a four-story facility which contains sixteen classrooms and a 180-seat tiered lecture hall, in addition to a cafe and lounge. Hyland Hall also housed the university's bookstore until it was moved to the DeNaples Center in 2008. The site of Hyland Hall was previously occupied by Lackawanna College, prior to its move to 901 Prospect Avenue. Since 2001, Hyland has also been home to the university's Hope Horn Art Gallery. Before moving to Hyland, the university's art gallery had been located in The Gallery, which was demolished in 2001.

=== Institute of Molecular Biology and Medicine ===
Completed in August 1996, the Institute of Molecular Biology and Medicine was funded by a $7.5 million grant from the U.S. Air Force and the Department of Defense. The 1,500 square-foot facility houses research laboratories, offices, and the Northeast Regional Cancer Institute. The IMBM is dedicated to the molecular biological research, chiefly in the field of proteomics, or the study of the full set of proteins encoded by a genome.

=== Loyola Science Center ===
Completed in 2011, the Loyola Science Center, also known as the Unified Science Center, houses the university's Biology, Chemistry, Computing Sciences, Mathematics, and Physics/Electrical Engineering departments as well as any programs currently associated with these departments. In addition, it is designed to serve as a center for collaborative learning for all members of the campus and the community and to create a physical space that would deepen the university's culture of engagement.

The center includes a nearly 150,000-square-foot, four-story new structure on what was previously a parking lot along Monroe Avenue and Ridge Row which has been seamlessly integrated into nearly 50,000 square feet of renovated space in the Harper McGinnis Wing of St. Thomas Hall, which was built in 1987 to house the physics and electrical engineering departments. The Harper-McGinnis Wing of St. Thomas Hall was extensively renovated in 2012 while the Science Center was being built. It now houses the departments of Theology and Religious Studies, Communication, Philosophy, History as well as the office of LA/WS, or Latin American and Women's Studies, and the university's radio station, 99.5 WUSR. Finally, the design includes a new entrance into St. Thomas Hall and the science center from the Commons.

The Loyola Science Center contains 34 teaching and research laboratories, a rooftop greenhouse for teaching and research, a 180-seat lecture hall for symposia and seminars, numerous group study and research areas, 22 classrooms, 80 offices, a multi-story atrium, and a vivarium. Additionally, the second floor of the Harper-McGinnis wing contains an area which highlights student, faculty, and community work and engages visitors. It contains a large television which displays the University Twitter feeds, the science center's energy usage, and videos featuring student and faculty research; glass exhibits which feature research projects and science displays; and aquariums which house fish for student study from a variety of different ecosystems. The Loyola Science Center also contains Bleeker Street, a coffee shop and cafe. The center was designed to meet the Silver standard for Leadership in Energy and Environmental Design (LEED) certification, though it has not gone through the certification process.

The $85 million, nearly 200,000-square foot building is the largest capital project in the history of the Jesuit university and the culmination of more than 15 years of planning and preparation. After the Science Education Committee created the vision that would eventually become the Loyola Science Center in the fall of 1998, it took two years to complete a paper about the vision. After seven years of programming meetings, the university broke ground May 14, 2009, for the facility's construction.

The Loyola Science Center was dedicated on September 28, 2012. The center was named in honor of St. Ignatius of Loyola, the founder of the Society of Jesus. Additionally, three wings inside the building have been named to honor the contributions and service of members of the University of Scranton community. On November 11, 2011, the first wing was dedicated as McDonald Hall. Herbert McDonald served as president of the staff and chairman of the department of surgery at Hahnemann Hospital, now known as the Geisinger Community Medical Center of Scranton, and his wife Mary McDonald served on the university's board of trustees and vice chair from 1989 to 1992. Milani Hall was dedicated on March 24, 2012, in honor of Dr. Frank Milani '55, as a recognition of his family's continued support of the university after he received his Bachelor of Science in biology from the university in 1955. In recognition of Carl J. Keuhner and JoAnne M. Keuhner, Keuhner Hall was dedicated on August 5, 2012. Carl Kuehner served on the board of trustees from 2003 to 2009 as well as chairman of the board from 2007 to 2009. The fourth wing, Harper-McGinnis Hall, located in St. Thomas Hall, was built and dedicated in 1987 in recognition of physics professors Joseph P. Harper, Ph.D., the chairman of the physics department, and Eugene A. McGinnis, PhD, a long-time physics professor at the university. Together, these men contributed more than 70 years of teaching service to the university.

In 1968, the University of Scranton purchased the land where Loyola Science Center stands from the Scranton Redevelopment Authority for $25,221.60 as part of the city's urban renewal project. The 42,007 square foot lot, located at the eastern corner of Monroe Avenue and Ridge Row, had previously been occupied by Auto Express Company. From the time of its purchase until construction began on the Loyola Science Center, the site served as a parking lot with sidewalks, landscaping, and lighting.

=== McDade Center for Literary and Performing Arts ===
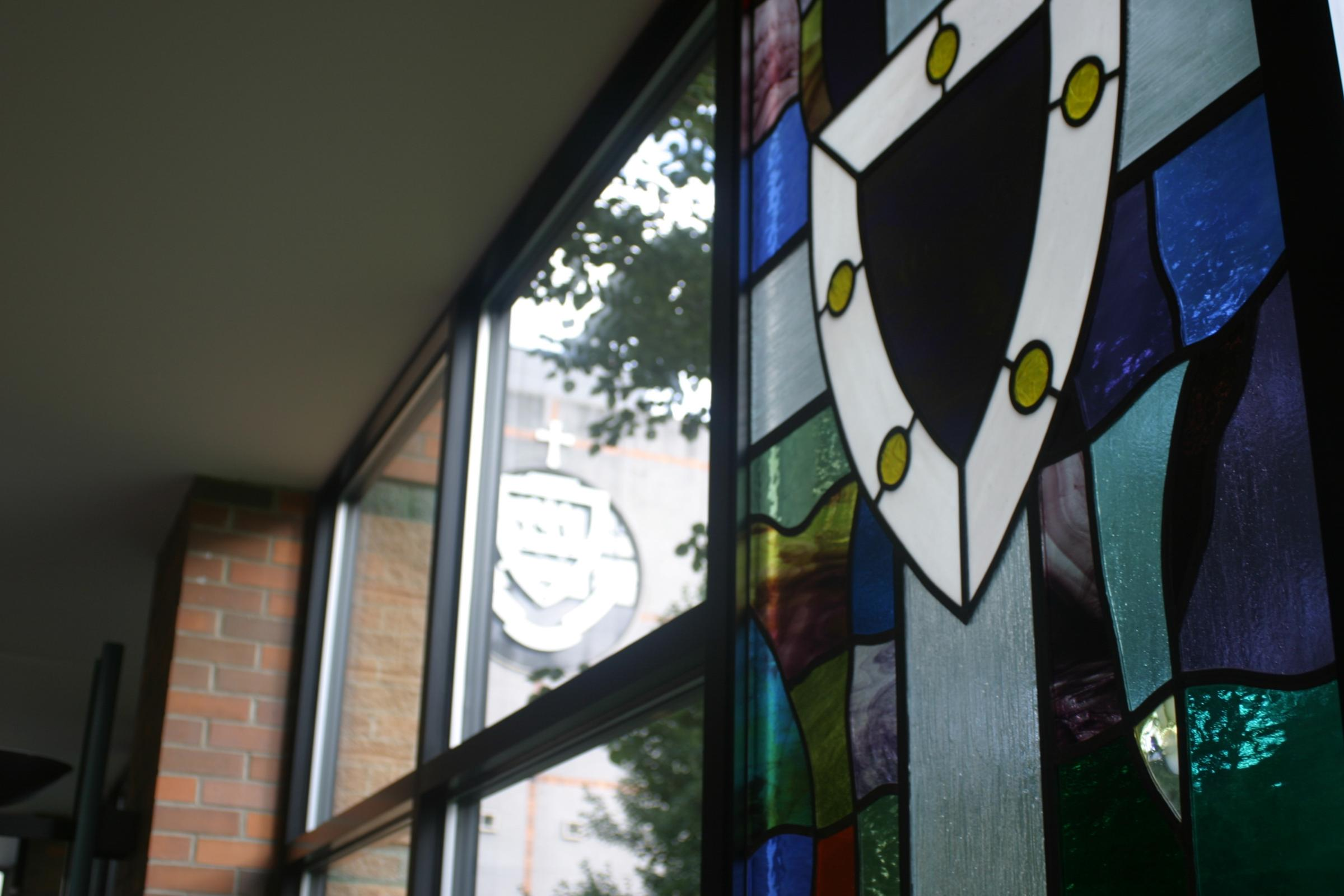
McDade Center for Literary and Performing Arts

The McDade Center for Literary and Performing Arts was constructed in 1992 on the former site of the Lackawanna County Juvenile Center. Home to the university's English & Theatre department's classrooms, offices, labs, meeting spaces, and a black box studio theatre, the McDade Center also houses the 300-seat Royal Theater where the University Players stage their productions. The building's other features include a computer writing and instructions lab, a seminar room, a small screening room for film classes and an office for Esprit, the university's Review of Arts and Letters. Additionally, the building contains stained glass in the lobby and an engraved quotation above the main entrance.

The building's exterior features "The Doorway to the Soul," a steel and wire sculpture by Pennsylvania artist Lisa Fedon. "The Doorway" consists of 18 framed images fabricated variously of steel plate, perforated steel, round steel bars and wire cloth which each represent experiences in the human journey towards truth while the grid itself represented a matrix of inner-connectedness. The individual panels within the grid are titled: The Thinker; Reaching Out To My Self; Natural and Curious Yearning of a Child; Eternal Bridge; Acceptance; A State of Calm, Peace, Knowing; Trials and Tribulation/The Ascent; The Void/God; The Writer; Father, Son, and Holy Spirit; Hope/Prayer; Christ; The Climb/The Worn Steps/The Invitation to Enter; The Written Word; Unconditional Love and Caring/Innocence of Children; The Self Exposed. The two external panels are: The Self Observing and The Only Begotten Son.

At the dedication ceremony in 1993, the building was named in honor of the Joseph M. McDade because of "his continuous support of this area and of the university and its academic mission," Rev. Panuska noted.

The McDade Center location was once the site of Crawford House, the 1898 Tudor Revival home of coal operator, baron, and Peoples Coal Company owner James L. Crawford. In 1992, several years after Crawford's wife died, Lackawanna County purchased the estate to serve as the Juvenile Detention Center. In 1989, after four years of negotiations, the University of Scranton acquired Crawford House. Originally, the university planned to renovate and restore the property, where it would relocate the Admissions and Financial Aid offices as well as a combinations switchboard and a visitors area. The university discovered that the interior damage was too severe and that it would not be economically feasible to renovate it.

The university's decision to demolish the Crawford House ignited fierce controversy because of strong opposition from local historical organizations, such as the Lackawanna Historical Society, the State Historic Preservation Office, and the Architectural Heritage Association who believed the house "represent[ed] the lifestyle of a coal baron of the late nineteenth century," and was therefore significant for Scranton, a city founded on coal. In an attempt to compromise with those upset by the potential demolition of Crawford House, the university proposed that the building be relocated in order to preserve its historical aspects but this too proved too costly so Crawford House was demolished in 1991. Rather than using the site for administrative offices as originally planned, the university decided to build the Instructional Arts Facility which would be home to the English and Theater departments, as the need for performing arts space was identified back in 1983. The Crawford House was subsequently delisted from the National Register in 1992.

=== McGurrin Hall ===
Completed in 1998, McGurrin Hall houses many of the departments in the J.A. Panuska College of Professional Studies, including Education, Nursing, Counseling and Human Services, and Health Administration and Human Resources. The departments of Exercise Science, Occupational Therapy, and Physical Therapy, also part of the Panuska College, are housed in the adjacent Center for Rehabilitation Education, also known as Edward R. Leahy Jr. Hall. McGurrin's four stories include classrooms, laboratories, teaching instruction labs, and counseling suites as well as the Panuska College of Professional Studies’ advising center and administration offices. When it was built, McGurrin was outfitted with the latest, most advanced technology in its labs and media-based equipment to deal with instruction in electronic media.

McGurrin Hall is named in honor of Mary Eileen Patricia McGurrin, R.N., M.S.N., a former student at the University of Scranton and the daughter of Kathleen Hyland McGurrin and the late John F. McGurrin Sr. Ms. McGurrin was an honors student at Abington Heights High School, earned her bachelor's and master's degrees in nursing from Thomas Jefferson College of Allied Health Services in Philadelphia. A member of the American Nurses Association, she was a registered nurse who served on the staff of Wills Eye Hospital in Philadelphia following completion of her training. She died of cancer in 1995 at the age of thirty-nine. In loving memory of his niece, McGurrin's uncle, Bernard V. Hyland, M.D., made a significant contribution to the Campaign for Scranton, which helped finance the building named in her memory. Dr. Hyland hoped that all of the students who pass through the doors of McGurrin Hall will be filled with the same spirit of selfless service animated by Mary Eileen. University President Rev. McShane noted that "it’s really appropriate and magnificent that the home of a professional studies is named for a nurse."

==== Leahy Community Health & Family Center ====
In 2003, the University of Scranton opened the Leahy Community Health & Family Center, which is located on the bottom floor of McGurrin Hall.

The center is named for Edward J. Leahy, the late son of benefactors Patricia and Edward R. Leahy who died at the age of eight due to his significant disabilities.

=== O'Hara Hall ===
Built in 1922, O’Hara Hall was originally called the Glen Alden building and served as the Scranton administrative headquarters for the Glen Alden Coal Company, which at one time had extensive anthracite operations in the Scranton area. Located at the corner of Jefferson and Linden Avenues, the building was sold to the GA Building Corp in 1955 before being acquired by Alden Associates in 1958 before its title was transferred to the Prudential Savings Bank of Brooklyn. During this time, it served as office space for a variety of local Scranton businesses and professional offices. The Neoclassical, six-story building was sold to the University of Scranton in 1968 for $157,000.

After renovations and improvements, the University of Scranton used the building to provide the school with more room for its facilities, particularly additional classrooms, faculty offices, supporting administrative services, and conference rooms. O’Hara Hall also became the home of the Business Administration and Economics departments, including their accompanying statistics and accounting laboratories. From 1978 until 2001, O’Hara Hall served as the headquarters for the university's School of Management.

In 2001, after the Kania School of Management moved to the newly constructed Brennan Hall, O'Hara Hall was renovated and occupied by 11 other university departments, including both administrative offices and some programs for the College of Arts and Sciences such as the Dexter Hanley College (now the College of Graduate and Continuing Education), Alumni Relations, the Annual Fund, Continuing Education, Development, the World Languages and Cultures department, Instructional Development, the Learning Resource Center, the Political Science department, Public Relations, and the Sociology and Criminal Justice department. The renovations include the construction of a foreign language laboratory with 25 computers for students taking courses in the World Languages and Cultures department. In 2016, the office of the Registrar and Academic Services moved from St. Thomas Hall into O’Hara Hall.

After polling the university community for suggestions, the university decided to rename the Glen Alden Building as O’Hara Hall, in honor of Frank J. O'Hara to recognize his tireless service and incredible contributions to the university. Known as "Mr University," Dr. O’Hara graduated from the university in 1925, served as the school's registrar for 32 years, worked as the university's director of alumni relations from 1957 until 1970, received an honorary doctor of laws degree from the university, served as moderator of the University of Scranton Alumni Society.

=== St. Thomas Hall ===
In 1960, the University of Scranton announced plans for a new classroom building, intended to replace the unsafe and overcrowded Barrack buildings, which had been purchased from the Navy in order to quickly accommodate the growing student body, which increased in the 1940s due to the G.I. Bill, a law which provided a range of benefits for returning World War II veterans, including paying for tuition and living expenses to attend college. After holding a major fundraising campaign to raise $1,836,000 for the new building as well as to finish other expansion projects at the library and the student center, the university was ready to begin construction on the new building.

Before building could commence, however, mine tunnels under the site needed to be backfilled. Excavations underground showed that the proposed building site was directly above the oldest mine in Scranton, whose origins date back to the Civil War. Supported only by wooden beams and decaying tree trunks, these huge mine chambers showed signs of extensive mining and "local" caving more than fifty feet below the surface. In order to ensure that the new building would be constructed on a firm and strong foundation, mining experts created columns of debris more than 13 feet in circumference and flushed the open cavern with more than 18,000 cubic feet of concrete. The total cost of construction was approximately $1,400,000.

Constructed at the corner of Linden and Monroe Streets, St. Thomas Hall was completed in 1962. Five stories tall, the modern L-shaped building contained 50 classrooms, 15 utility rooms, 11 equipment rooms, 10 corridors, and 128 offices, for both faculty and administrators. In addition, the building housed ROTC offices, student lounges, the St. Ignatius Loyola Chapel with room for over two hundred participants, and four laboratories.

During the dedication of St. Thomas, the original cornerstone from the university's first building, Old Main, was built into the front corner of St. Thomas Hall. Seventy five years after Old Main's blessing in 1888, the University of Scranton transferred its cornerstone to the new campus, linking the university with its past and providing continuity from both the university's former name, St. Thomas College, and its old campus. When the cornerstone was removed from its place in Old Main, it was discovered that it held a copper box, containing six newspapers published on the day of Old Main's dedication and seven silver coins. During the dedication of St. Thomas Hall, the 1888 newspapers were placed back into the cornerstone, along with letters from student body president Jack Kueny, Alumni Society president Atty. James A. Kelly, and alumnus and longtime administrator Frank O'Hara. Also included was a letter from architect Robert P. Moran '25, addressed to the architect of a building that replaced St. Thomas in the future.

Over the years, there have been numerous renovations and improvements of Saint Thomas Hall. In 1965, the gas station at Linden Street and Monroe Avenue on the western end of the University of Scranton complex in front of St. Thomas Hall was razed in order to eliminate the cumbersome and dangerous curve at that intersection. In its place, the island was built, allowing traffic onto campus to be routed around it. In 1987, the Harper-McGinnis Wing was added to St. Thomas Hall to house the Physics and Electronics Engineering department. Funded by the university's Second Cornerstone campaign, the Harper-McGinnis Wing is a two-floor addition that contained offices and laboratories for physics, electrical engineering, and computing sciences. At the time of its opening, it contained several cutting-edge research laboratories, including a modern and atomic physical lab, an optics and electronics lab, a microprocessor lab, an electricity and magnetism lab, a very large system integration (VLSI) lab, a microcomputer lab, and a computer assisted design lab.

The Harper-McGinnis Wing was dedicated in recognition of physics professors Joseph P. Harper, Ph.D., the chairman of the physics department, and Eugene A. McGinnis, Ph.D., a long-time physics professor at the university. Together, these men contributed more than 70 years of teaching service to the university. Then, in 2009, renovations during the summer targeted the first and fourth floors of St. Thomas Hall, converting the former St. Ignatius of Loyola Chapel space into offices for Human Resources and Financial Aid. St. Thomas Hall was significantly renovated in 2011-2012 as part of the construction of the Loyola Science Center. It now houses the departments of Theology and Religious Studies, Communications, Philosophy, History as well as the office of LA/WS, or Latin American and Women's Studies, and the university's radio station, 99.5 WUSR.

St. Thomas Hall was named in honor of the namesake of St. Thomas College, now the University of Scranton.

=== Smurfit Arts Center ===
In January 1987, the University of Scranton under Rev. Panuska purchased the former John Raymond Memorial Church, Universalist, at Madison Avenue and Vine Street for $125,000. Built in 1906, the Romanesque building contains one of the tallest bell towers in Scranton. The main floor of the small but remarkably designed structure, which contains 7,200 square feet of floor space, is used as a studio-art facility for the Fine Arts program. The basement is used for the department's offices and classrooms. During the renovations of the building, the university had to remove the stained glass windows and replace them with clear glass to provide the area with natural lighting. The two stained glass windows from the Smurfit Arts Center, which were crafted by the Tiffany Glass Company, were moved to be displayed in Hyland Hall. The Smurfit Arts Center was named for Michael W. J. Smurfit H'85, a generous Irish benefactor whose two sons, Anthony and Michael, attended the University of Scranton. Smurfit was the chairman and chief executive officer of Jefferson Smurfit Group, Ltd., a multinational corporation with headquarters in Dublin, IReland; Alton, Illinois; and New York City.

The Smurfit Arts Center is one of three churches the university acquired and preserved during the 1980s once their congregations were no longer able to maintain the buildings. In 1985, the university converted the former Assembly of God Church at 419 Monroe Avenue into Rev. Joseph A. Rock, S.J., Hall. It currently houses Madonna Della Strada Chapel, the principal campus setting for university liturgies, as well as the university's Military Science department and ROTC program. In 1986, the university acquired the Immanuel Baptist Church at the corner of Jefferson Avenue and Mulberry Street. Currently, the Houlihan-McLean Center houses the university's Performance Music Programs. The university acquired the former John Raymond Memorial Church, Madison Avenue and Vine Street, in 1987. It now serves as the Smurfit Arts Center, which houses studio space for the university's Fine Arts department. The university's efforts were cited in a 1988 edition of Inspired, a bi-monthly publication devoted to the preservation of historic religious buildings.

== Athletic facilities ==
=== Fitzpatrick Field ===
In 1984, the university completed construction on its very first athletic field in the school's 96-year history, which began in 1982 after the university acquired the land from the Scranton Redevelopment Authority. The land had previously been used as a rail yard for the Lackawanna and Wyoming Valley Railroad. The facility was designed as a multi-sports complex, complete with a regulation-size field for men's and women's soccer which also can be used for other sports such as softball, lacrosse, field hockey, and intramural athletics. It also has bleachers which can seat 350 people, an electronic scoreboard, and a maintenance building containing restrooms, a storage area, and a parking lot. Father Panuska noted that the building of the field was important because it fosters "the development of a total learning environment, an environment which supports a balanced life."

The university's board of trustees named the field in honor of Rev. John J. Fitzpatrick, S.J., a long-time booster of the university's athletic programs and dedicated member of the university community for twenty-two years.

In 1997, a re-dedication ceremony celebrated the installation of new artificial turf and improved lighting for the field. Currently, Fitzpatrick Field remains the university's primary outdoor athletic facility and is used for the Royal's varsity soccer, field hockey, and lacrosse teams. The field is also used for intramural flag football, ultimate frisbee, soccer, and field hockey.

=== Long Center ===
Completed in 1967, the John J. Long Center contained the university's first indoor athletic facilities, as well as instructional areas for physical education. The Long Center is built into the slope of Linden Street, providing a single level on Linden Street and a three-story end of the building, overlooking Ridge Row. The Long Center was built to enable the university to institute an academic program in physical education and provide a space for student assemblies, convocations, group meetings, and other large gatherings. It was also created to give greater emphasis to intramural athletics and improve the school's intercollegiate athletics.

At the time of its construction, the top floor featured a large entrance foyer and a gymnasium, complete with movable bleacher seats that could accommodate up to 4,500 people. The gymnasium contained three basketball courts, complete with a folding curtain in order to separate the gym, allowing multiple games or gym classes the occur at the same time. It also contained two ticket rooms, court rooms and rest rooms, a sound control room, offices for the director and assistants of the physical education program, an equipment room, and storage rooms. The second floor housed locker room facilities, rest rooms, and showers, in addition to saunas, whirlpool baths, and a sun room. It also had a training room, small offices for athletic coaches, a weight room, and an all-purpose room. The bottom floor contained a wrestling room, a mechanical room, and laundry facilities.

The Long Center was built on land, spanning 4.93 acres, that the university purchased from the Scranton Redevelopment Authority for $96,843, as part of the city's urban renewal project. Before handing over the title to the university, the Scranton Redevelopment Authority cleared the lot, located at the eastern corner of Linden Street and Catlin Court, by demolishing several existing structures.

In order to pay for the $1.8 million facility, the University of Scranton acquired a $592,110 grant through the Higher Education Facilities Act and took out a $815,000 federal loan, made possible by the support of Congressman Joseph M. McDade and U.S. Senator Joseph Clark. The university shouldered the remaining costs.

In 2001, excavation under the Long Center provided a new home for the Department of Exercise Science and Sport. The additional 10,000 square feet of space accommodated offices, classrooms, a fitness assessment center, and laboratories for sport biomechanics, body composition, cardio-metabolic analysis, biochemistry, and muscular skeletal fitness. However, with the completion of the Center of Rehabilitation Education (also known as Edward R. Leahy, Jr. Hall) in 2015, the Exercise Science Department relocated from the Long Center into the new building.

After its completion in 1967, the university dedicated the athletic facility in honor of its former president, John J. Long, S.J., who served the university in that position from 1953 until 1963, to commemorate his dedication and tremendous contributions to the university. After he stepped down from the presidency, Fr. Long continued to serve the university in other positions, including assistant to the president, founder and moderator of the Alumni Society, and vice president for administrative affairs. During his tenure as president, he led the university in its first major building campaign. Starting in 1956, the campus was greatly expanded and modernized through the construction of fifteen new buildings, which included the Loyola Hall of Science, 10 student residence halls, St. Thomas Hall, Alumni Memorial Hall (formerly known as the Alumni Memorial Library) and Gunster Memorial Student Center (formerly known as the Student Union Building, and was demolished in 2008) as well as the Long Center. He successfully led the university through two fundraising drives in order to finance these building projects, which also had the effect of incorporating the university into the Scranton community.

=== Byron Recreation Complex ===
In 1985, the university began construction on a physical education and recreation complex. Completed in 1986, the William J. Byron, S.J. Recreation Complex is a three-level structure which connects to the Long Center, the facility for intercollegiate athletics. The facility contains three multi-use courts for basketball, volleyball, tennis, and one-wall handball as well as a one-tenth mile indoor running track, a six-lane Olympic-sized swimming pool complete with diving boards and an electronic scoreboard, four 4-wall racquetball courts, a gallery which overlooks the swimming pool and the racquetball courts, two different aerobics/dance rooms, men's and women's locker rooms, saunas, and steam rooms. Panuska spoke about the importance of the new recreation complex, stating that it would help the university offer more "health-related activities" and to serve the recreational needs of the student body, including the intramural program. Panuska also noted that naming this facility for Fr. Byron, the president of the University of Scranton from 1975 until 1982, "provides us with a marvelous opportunity to thank him for his leadership at the university and in the region."

== Additional buildings and spaces ==
=== Brown Hall ===
Located at 600 Linden Street and Adams Avenue, Brown Hall, formerly named the Adlin Building, was acquired by the university in 2012 from Adlin Building Partnership. On February 18, 2016, the university renamed Adlin Building as Louis Stanley Brown Hall, in memory of Louis Stanley Brown '19, the first black graduate of St. Thomas College.

=== Campion Hall ===
Campion Hall, opened in 1987, is the university's residence building for the Jesuit community. The faculty, named in honor of Saint Edmund Campion, S.J., a 16th-century Jesuit pastor and scholar who was martyred in England during the persecutions of Roman Catholics for defending his faith, provides living and working accommodations for thirty Jesuits. The two-story building features thirty-one bedrooms, an interior garden, an office, kitchen and dining facilities, and a chapel in addition to a flexible design with four discrete sections, such that the building could adapt to the changing needs of the Jesuit Community at the university. Before the construction of Campion Hall, the primary residence for the Jesuits at Scranton was the estate, the former Scranton family residence which was given to the university by the family in 1941, which proved unable to meet their needs, as it only provided living accommodations for seventeen of the university's thirty-six Jesuits in the 1980s. The building of Campion Hall, estimated at $1.7 million, was financed entirely by the university's Jesuit community. Currently, Campion Hall provides housing for Jesuits who teach or hold administrative positions at the University of Scranton or at Scranton Preparatory School, a local Jesuit high school.

=== Chapel of the Sacred Heart ===
Completed in 1928, the Chapel of the Sacred Heart, formerly the Alumni House and the Rupert Mayer House, was originally part of the Scranton Estate. It was designed as a small athletic facility, containing a gym and a squash court. While Worthington Scranton donated the estate to the university in 1941, he reserved this building, the Quain Conservatory greenhouse, and Scranton Hall (the carriage house) for his own personal use. In 1958, the remainder of the late Worthington Scranton's Estate was acquired by the university, including the chapel. The university reportedly paid $48,000 for the title to the land.

Over the years, the building has served the university in a variety of ways. First, the facility was used as the center of athletics, complete with a weight facility and the Athletic Director's office. In 1968, when the construction of the Long Center was completed, the athletic facilities were moved from the chapel to the new building. The building was then used as a print shop, which was moved to O’Hara Hall. Then, the chapel was used as the headquarters for the university's Alumni Association, beginning in the 1970s until 2009. In 2009, following improvements and changes in St. Thomas Hall, the Chapel moved from its location on first floor St. Thomas Hall to the newly renovated Rupert Mayer House. Currently, the chapel is used for daily masses, eucharistic adoration, and prayer by students, faculty, and staff of the University of Scranton.

=== Dionne Green ===
In 2008, with the completion of the DeNaples Center, the Gunster Memorial Student Center was functionally superseded. As a result, it was demolished. In its place, the university created the Dionne Green, a 25,000-square-foot green space roughly the size of a football field featuring a 3,600 sq ft outdoor amphitheater, a popular spot for classes during pleasant weather. Located directly in front of the DeNaples Center, it serves as the gateway to the campus. Dionne Green, along with the DeNaples Center and Condron Hall, was part of the university's Pride, Passion, Promise campaign, a $100 million effort to improve and update the campus.

The Dionne Green was named for John Dionne '86 and Jacquelyn Rasieleski Dionne '89, University of Scranton alumni and benefactors.

=== The Estate ===
In 1867, Joseph H. Scranton, one of the founders of the city of Scranton, commissioned the building of his family home. Designed by New York architect Russell Sturgis, one of America's most outstanding architects in the post Civil War era, the home was created in the French Second Empire style. The house features stone masonry by William Sykes and detailed woodwork carvings designed by William F. Paris. The 25-room, three-story residence contained a billiards room, a ballroom, a library, a Tiffany glass skylight, and a solid mahogany staircase. It is estimated that the cost of construction totaled $150,000.

Throughout the years, a number of renovations and improvements were made on the estate. The house initially featured a tower located on top of the front left corner of the estate's roof, which was later removed. Additionally, while occupying the residence, William W. Scranton built the large granite wall surrounding the property in order to protect the estate and keep out rioting townspeople, upset about the tuberculosis epidemic that they felt had been spread through the city's water supply, the rights of which were owned by the Scranton family. Parts of the wall were later removed during the construction of Loyola Hall in 1956. There used to be two open porches in the back of the estate. In the early 1970s, both porches were enclosed and converted into a sitting room and a dining room.

Construction commenced in 1867 and continued for four years, finishing in time for the Scranton family's Thanksgiving celebrations in November 1871. Less than a year later, Joseph H. Scranton died. His son, William W. Scranton, then inherited the property. After William W. Scranton's death, his wife, Katherine M. Scranton, used the home until her death in 1935, at which point it passed into the hands of their son, Worthington Scranton. Because Worthington's wife Marjorie was a wheelchair user, she had difficulty navigating around the estate. They built a new home outside of Scranton in Abington called "Marworth." Once construction on Marworth was completed in 1941, the Scrantons moved out of the estate entirely, although that house had never been their primary residence.

In 1941, Worthington Scranton donated his home and adjoining estate to Bishop Hafey, the bishop of the Diocese of Scranton and the University of Scranton's board of trustees president, for use by the university, because he felt that this land could be "most advantageously used for the development of an institution of higher learning so that the youth of this vicinity can get an education at a reasonable cost." However, he reserved the former carriage house, which he had converted into an office, the greenhouse, and the squash court for his own personal use. Following Worthington's death in 1958, his son, William W. Scranton, gave the remainder of the estate to the University of Scranton.

In 1942, when the Christian Brothers transferred the title of the university to the Society of Jesus, the Jesuits decided to use the estate as the Jesuit community residence. After some renovations by the Jesuits, the first floor of the residence held a chapel, reception parlor, a 5,000-volume library, and recreation room, while the second and third floors served as private rooms for the Jesuits. In 1957, a small fire broke out in the house's main parlor. During the 1960s, the Jesuit community restored the estate. Most of the interior woodwork was refinished for preservation purposes, and the ceiling frescoes were repainted and gold leafing was added to them. In 1987, the Scranton Jesuit community moved from the estate into the newly completed Campion Hall, as the estate proved to be insufficient for the community's needs, as it could only accommodate 17 priests in the then-36 member community.

In 2009, the Admissions Office moved its operations into the estate.

=== Founder's Green ===
In 2001, after a period of significant campus expansion at the university, the Gallery Building was functionally superseded, as the departments it housed were moved to the newly remodeled O’Hara Hall and to Hyland Hall, including the university's art gallery, the Counseling Center, and the Department of Career Services as well as classrooms and lecture halls. As a result, it was demolished. In its place, the university created Founders Green, a large, open green space, which is located directly in front of Brennan Hall.

=== Galvin Terrace ===
Upon the completion of St. Thomas Hall in 1962, the Barracks buildings no longer needed to be used by the university for classrooms and lecture halls. As a result, the buildings were demolished. In place of the barrack called the Arts Building, the university created an outdoor recreation facility on the block bounded by Linden Street, Monroe Avenue, Mulberry Street, and Hitchcock Court. The $86,000 project created four volleyball courts, three basketball courts, a grass practice field for football and soccer, and a faculty parking lot. However, the fields were not lighted, so all activities had to be scheduled during the day.

In the late 1970s, the university decided to renovate and improve these recreational facilities. The school built the Galvin Terrace Sport and Recreation Complex, which contained six tennis courts, two combination basketball/volleyball courts capable of also accommodating street hockey, four handball/racquetball courts, and recreational and lounging space. Completed in October 1978, the project was funded by the university's Annual Fund Drive and its national capital campaign "Commitments to Excellence." It was used for intramural sports but also served as the home of the university's tennis team. In the early 1990s, the recreational complex was demolished to make room for the Weinberg Memorial Library. A small garden outside the Library is now known as Galvin Terrace.

The Galvin Terrace was named for former university president Rev. Aloysius Galvin, S.J., who served as Scranton's president from 1965 until 1970. Born in Baltimore, Rev. Galvin served in the U.S. Navy from 1943 until 1946, and graduated from Loyola College, Baltimore in 1948. He joined the Society of Jesus upon his college graduation in 1948, pursued philosophical and theological studies at Woodstock College, Maryland, and was ordained to the priesthood in 1957. Rev. Galvin served as the Academic Vice President and Dean of Loyola College, Baltimore from 1959 to 1965. After resigning from the university presidency, Rev. Galvin worked at Georgetown Preparatory School as a math teacher and student counselor for thirty-five years before his death in 2007.

=== Mosque ===
In 1996, the university community renovated a university-owned house at 317 North Webster Avenue into the Campus Mosque as a gift to the Muslim community of Scranton. The university established the campus mosque in response to the growing need for a local mosque for the growing number of Muslim students, as there had not previously been any mosques in the city of Scranton.

The Mosque contained two large, spacious rooms as the women's and men's prayer rooms as well as a library housing countless reference books on the history of Islam and the Muslim religion, including translations of the interpretations of the Koran. The Mosque was also equipped with an upstairs apartment where two members of the Muslim Student Association lived and served as caretakers of the facility.

In 2007, the Mosque, along with several other properties, was razed in order to establish a site for the sophomore residence, Condron Hall. The university then purchased and renovated a house at 306 Taylor Avenue for use as the new mosque, which is open to the public for prayer and reflection.

=== Pantle Rose Garden ===
When the University of Scranton acquired the Scranton family estate in the mid-1950s, the school received a garden, located next to the Chapel of the Sacred Heart at the corner of Linden Street and Monroe Avenue on the former grounds of the estate. Throughout the years, it was known by a couple of different names, including the Rose Garden and Alumni Garden. In 2010, the university dedicated the Rose Garden to Rev. G. Donald Pantle, S.J. during the celebration of the 50th anniversary of his ordination, as a gift from James J. Knipper '81 and Teresa Poloney Knipper '82, in honor of their longtime friendship with Rev. Pantle.

=== Parking and Public Safety Pavilion ===
Completed in 1995, the Parking and Public Safety Pavilion accommodates 510 cars in its five stories, with one floor below ground, one floor at ground level, and three above ground. It was constructed to expand the university's on-campus parking capacity in order to meet the community's need for additional places to park, with designated areas for students, faculty, staff, and guests. Additionally, the parking garage contains the offices of the university's police and the offices of parking services. The structure, which occupies 163,000 square feet, is located on the corner of Mulberry Street and Monroe Avenue. The exterior complements the adjacent McDade Center for Literary and Performing Arts by mirroring its design. The Monroe Avenue facade is also covered by a series of topiary planting screens on which climbing vines have grown.

=== Quain Memorial Conservatory ===
Located between the Chapel of the Sacred Heart and Scranton Hall on the grounds of the original Scranton family Estate, the Quain Conservatory was built in 1872. The Scranton family used the greenhouse to grow and prepare cut flowers. The glass building has a central square (20 ft by 20 ft) flanked by two 40 ft by 15 ft wings on either side. At the time of its construction, each section had its own pool. The Conservatory is one of few Victorian-style conservatories that remains essentially unaltered from its original design.

In 1941, Worthington Scranton donated the estate and its grounds to the university, but reserved a portion of the estate for his own personal use, including the greenhouse. In 1958, after the death of Worthington Scranton, the Scranton family donated the remainder of the estate to the university, leading to the acquisition of the greenhouse.

In the early 1970s, the student-led University Horticultural Society coordinated and organized an effort to renovate and restore the greenhouse. In order to raise funds for their planned improvements, the Society organized field trips, plant sales, and a lecture series in addition to enrolling paid members to their group. Additionally, Father Quain, the Acting President of the university, found out about the project and contributed additional funds to the project. While restoring the greenhouse, the Society cleaned and painted the structures, refurbished the main pond and installed a new fountain pump, created a mushroom cellar in the greenhouse's basement, and redesigned the plant beds.

The group installed a number of rare and exotic plants in the conservatory, including orchids, banana trees, mango trees, bougainvillia, tri-colored dracaena, star-shaped trees, bromeliads, Hawaiian wax flowers, night blooming cereus, bi-colored water lilies, the Rose of China (hibiscus), fig trees, pomegranates, pineapples, and grapefruit trees. In September 1975, the university reopened and dedicated the greenhouse as the Edwin A. Quain Conservatory for his "kindness, interest, and generosity to the Society." Currently, the greenhouse is used for classes as well as faculty and personal research projects.

=== Roche Wellness Center ===
The Roche Wellness Center, located at the corner of Mulberry Street and North Webster Avenue, was acquired by the university in 1992 and opened for student use in 1996. Originally built in 1986 by pharmacist Alex Hazzouri, the Wellness Center previously housed Hazzouri's pharmacy and drugstore as well as a restaurant named Babe's Place. In 1989, Alex Hazzouri was arrested and arraigned on drug-trafficking charges, and his pharmacy was closed indefinitely, as the government seized the building. After the investigation was closed, the government auctioned off the building in 1992. It was purchased by the university for $500,000. Beginning on August 2, 1993, the building served as a home to the Scranton Police Department's Hill Section precinct station. A new Student Health and Wellness Center was soon moved in, along with the university's Drug and Alcohol Information Center and Educators (DICE) Office. In 1996, the Roche Wellness Center opened, housing the Student Health Services department. The building holds a reception area, four exam rooms, a laboratory, an assessment room, an observation room, and storage space.

=== Rock Hall ===
On December 15, 1983, the University of Scranton purchased the Assembly of God Church from the Reformed Episcopalian congregation who could no longer properly maintain the facility as the costs and utilities were too high. Once it was acquired by the university. the Assembly of God Church was renamed to Rock Hall to honor the late Rev. Joseph A. Rock, S.J., a well-known and respected educator at the University of Scranton. Originally, the university intended to use the first floor of the facility for administrative offices which had previously occupied space in St. Thomas and Jefferson Halls, including the Department of Central Services, the Maintenance Department, and the Security Department while the assembly area of the new hall was supposed to provide a needed alternative for smaller social and cultural affairs, including lectures, dinners, and dances, now held in the over-scheduled Jefferson and Eagen Auditoriums.

During the renovations of Rock Hall, however, the need for a new chapel was identified, as the St. Ignatius chapel in St. Thomas Hall did not provide adequate seating and contained structural limitations which were not conducive to acoustics or the aesthetics of the liturgies. Named Madonna della Strada, or "Our Lady of the Way", in reference to an image of the Virgin Mary enshrined in the Church of the Gesu in Rome, the Chapel serves as the primary site for the university's major liturgical services, including the regular Sunday masses. Rev. Panuska commented that the building and chapel are important additions to the school, particularly because the chapel "provides the university and the surrounding community with a beautiful setting for liturgical celebrations." The chapel was consecrated on February 15, 1985, by Bishop James C. Timlin, D.D. Currently, the first floor of Rock Hall is the home of the university's Military Science department and ROTC program.

Rock Hall is one of three churches the university acquired and preserved during the 1980s once their congregations were no longer able to maintain the buildings. In 1985, the university converted the former Assembly of God Church at 419 Monroe Avenue into Rev. Joseph A. Rock, S.J., Hall. It currently houses Madonna Della Strada Chapel, the principal campus setting for university liturgies, as well as the university's Military Science department and ROTC program. In 1986, the university acquired the Immanuel Baptist Church at the corner of Jefferson Avenue and Mulberry Street. Currently, the Houlihan-McLean Center houses the university's Performance Music Programs. The university acquired the former John Raymond Memorial Church, Madison Avenue and Vine Street, in 1987. It now serves as the Smurfit Arts Center, which houses studio space for the university's Fine Arts department. The university's efforts were cited in a 1988 edition of Inspired, a bi-monthly publication devoted to the preservation of historic religious buildings.

=== Scranton Hall ===
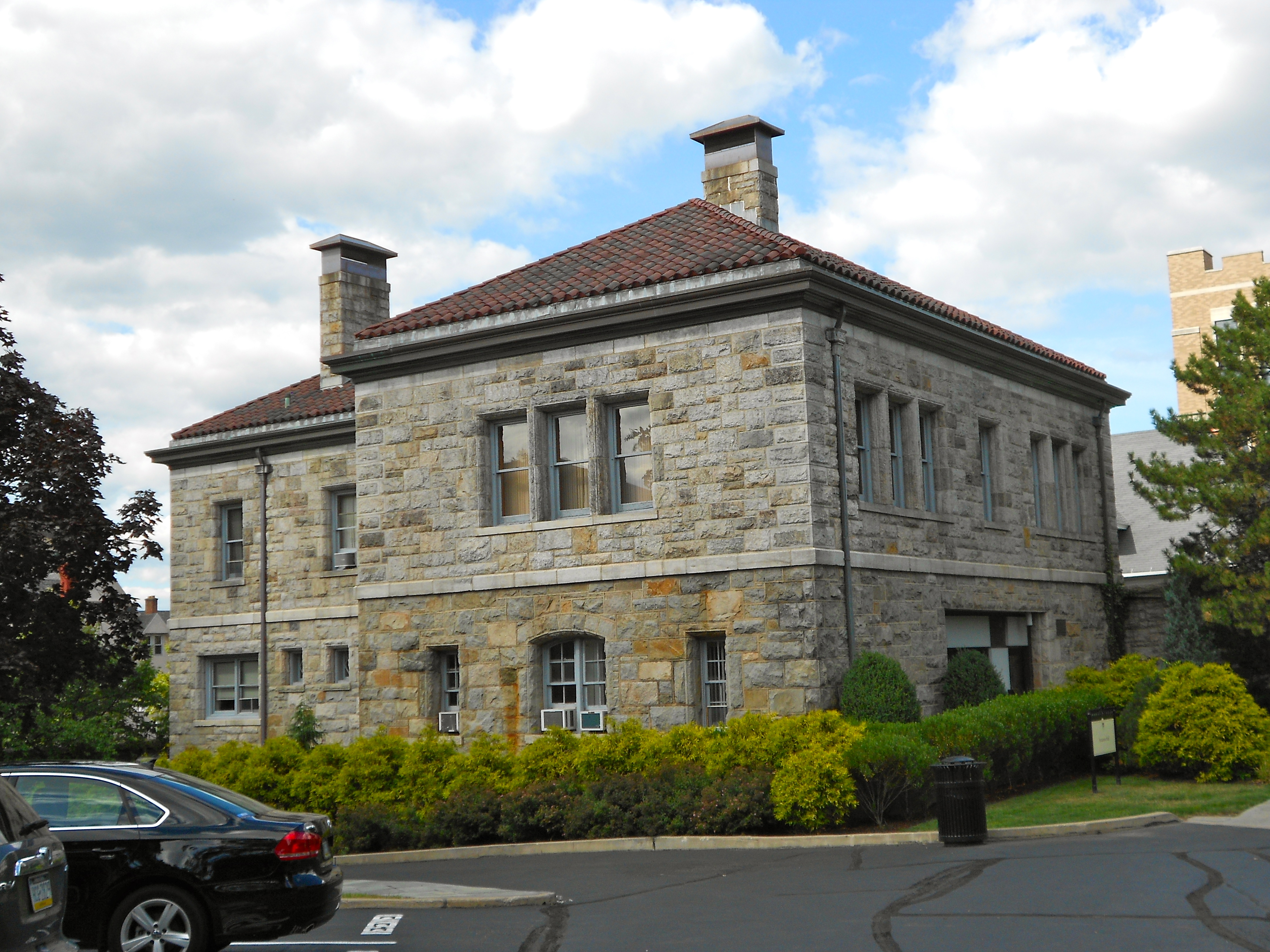
Scranton Hall, one of the original buildings of the Scranton Estate

Constructed in 1871, Scranton Hall was built as a one-story carriage house and stable on the Scranton family Estate by Joseph H. Scranton. In 1928 and continuing into 1929, Worthington Scranton and his wife added an additional story, renovating the building and converting it into an office space.

In 1941, Worthington Scranton donated his home and adjoining estate to Bishop Hafey, the bishop of the Diocese of Scranton and the University of Scranton's Board of Trustees President, for use by the university, because he felt that this land could be "most advantageously used for the development of an institution of higher learning so that the youth of this vicinity can get an education at a reasonable cost." However, he reserved the former carriage house, the greenhouse, and the squash court for his own personal use. Following Worthington's death in 1958, the university acquired the rest of the estate from his son, William W. Scranton, for $48,000. The former carriage house was of particular interest to the university because it would allow them to centralize the scattered administrative offices on campus. Since it was acquired in 1958, the building has been used to house the President's Office and other administrative offices.

From 1958 until 1984, the building was known simply as the President's Office Building. In 1984, the university's president Rev. J.A. Panuska, S.J. renamed the building as Scranton Hall to honor the contributions of the Scranton family. He stated that: "Ever since the Scrantons began migrating to Northeastern Pennsylvania in the late 1830s, their vision has touched the life of this region to such an extent that this city and this University bear their name."

== Retreat Center at Chapman Lake ==
In 1961, the University of Scranton purchased a nine-acre tract of lakefront property containing three buildings on Chapman Lake, about 30 minutes away from the university. Originally known as the Bosak Summer Estate, the land was owned by Walter Bloes, a tax collector, and was briefly converted into a restaurant-tavern before being sold to the university. The university bought the property for $65,000.

When the university acquired the estate, they named it Lakeside Pines. For several years, it was chiefly used as a place for relaxation by the Jesuits and for conferences with faculty members and student leaders. As time progressed, the university's Office of Campus Ministries began using the Chapman Lake property as a Retreat Center. The site originally had one old retreat house, featuring several bedrooms equipped with bunkbeds, a small chapel, a main room with a fireplace, a kitchen, and dining area.

In 1998, the university expanded the lakeside Conference and Retreat Center. Doubling the size of the center, the new 16,000 square-foot facility contained a dining room, kitchen, a large meeting room nicknamed the Lake Room, five small meeting rooms, and a residential wing with 11 bedrooms. In 2005, in order to meet the growing demand for retreats, the university expanded the Retreat Center again. The university built an 11,584-square-foot facility adjacent to building constructed in 1998. The old retreat center was demolished over safety concerns in 2004, making room for the expansion. The new addition contained a lounge, 21 more bedrooms, and a 65-seat modern chapel with large window views of the Lake. On November 7, 2006, the university dedicated the Retreat Center chapel, naming it in honor of Blessed Peter Faber, an early Jesuit who, together with St. Francis Xavier and St. Ignatius Loyola, served as the nucleus of the Society of Jesus. Born April 7, 1506, Peter Faber was the first of the companions to be ordained a priest.

== Residence halls ==
=== Freshman dorms ===
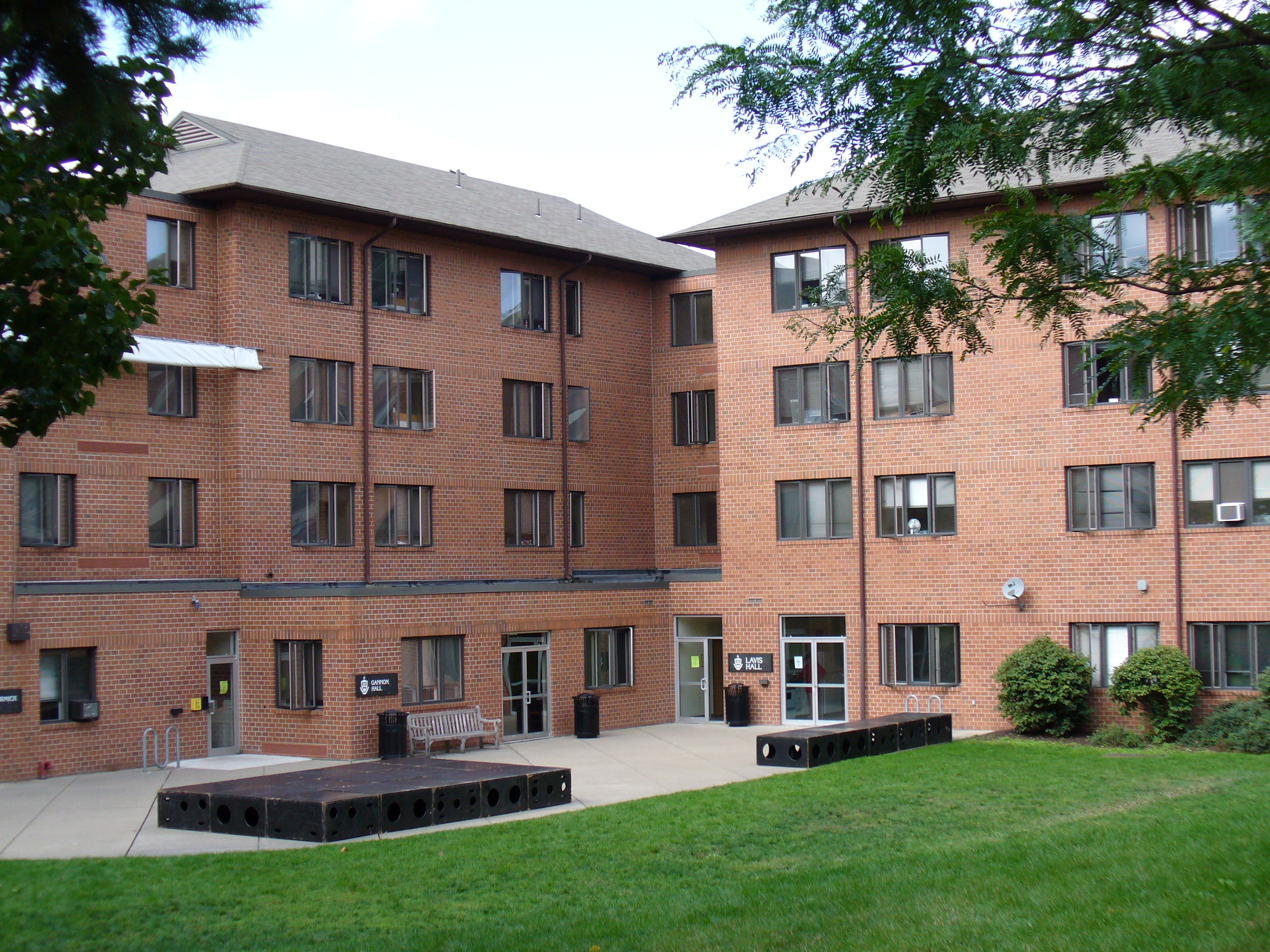
Lavis Hall, Gannon Hall, McCormick Hall, and the Freshman Patio set up for an event later that evening

First-year students are offered traditional double rooms that share a community restroom. All freshmen dorms are located near the center of the university's campus. Freshmen housing does not have air-conditioned or carpeted rooms. Each building has washers and dryers on the first floor for student use as well as light housekeeping services provided to all rooms and bathrooms.

- Casey Hall: houses 59 students, is co-ed by floor
  - Casey Hall was built in 1958, as part of the "Lower Quad," which also includes Fitch Hall, Martin Hall, and McCourt Hall. These buildings were the first four student residences on campus and were constructed at a cost of $757,000, financed by a loan from the College Housing-Program of the Federal Home and Housing Finance Agency. Portions of the Lower Quad location were formerly the sites of the Moffat residence (306 Quincy Avenue), donated to the university by the Epsteins in April 1955, and the Leonard/Shean family residence (312 Quincy Avenue), donated to the university by the Scranton Lodge of Elks. Casey Hall is named in honor of Joseph G. Casey, president of the Hotel Casey, director of Scranton's Chamber of Commerce, and a graduate of St. Thomas High School, who donated land to the university, as well as the interest, time, and encouragement that he contributed.
- Denis Edward Hall: houses 75 students, is co-ed by floor
  - Denis Edward Hall was built in 1962, as part of the "Upper Quad," which also includes Hafey Hall, Hannan Hall, and Lynett Hall. Denis Edward Hall is named in honor of Brother Denis Edward, who was the man responsible for changing the name of the university from St. Thomas College to the University of Scranton and was the school's third president. Under his tenure, from 1931 to 1940, enrollment doubled.
- Driscoll Hall: houses 139 students, is co-ed by floor, contains a kitchen, game room, and study space
  - In 1964, the University of Scranton acquired title to the future site of Driscoll and Nevils Halls at Mulberry Street and Clay Avenue from the Scranton Redevelopment Authority as part of the University Urban Renewal Project. Driscoll and Nevils Halls were built at a cost of $721,175 and originally build to house 120 students in each building, 240 in total. Both Driscoll and Nevils Halls are four-story buildings constructed with reinforced concrete members, which are exposed in the exterior brick walls. Rooms are 12 by 16 feet and were designed to accommodate two students along with desks, shelves, and closets. A garden mall divides the two buildings. Driscoll Hall is named in honor of James A. Driscoll, who was appointed to the university's teaching staff in 1925, and remained there for nearly forty years.
- Fitch Hall: houses 59 male students, contains a kitchen
  - Fitch Hall was built in 1958, as part of the "Lower Quad," which also includes Casey Hall, Martin Hall, and McCourt Hall. These buildings were the first four student residences on campus and were constructed at a cost of $757,000, financed by a loan from the College Housing-Program of the Federal Home and Housing Finance Agency. Portions of the Lower Quad location were formerly the sites of the Moffat residence (306 Quincy Avenue), donated to the university by the Epsteins in April 1955, and the Leonard/Shean family residence (312 Quincy Avenue), donated to the university by the Scranton Lodge of Elks. Prior to the construction of the Lower Quad, three homes on the 300 block of Quincy Avenue were used as student residences and were named Fitch, Martin, and McCourt Halls. In 1958, these names were transferred to the newly constructed residence halls, and the old houses were razed in order to make room for Gunster Memorial Student Center. Fitch Hall is named in honor of Martha Fitch, a registered nurse and superintendent of the old St. Thomas Hospital, who opened her home to university boarders while the college was still developing and donated her estate to the university upon her death. Fitch Hall was the home of the Jane Kopas Women's Center from its founding in 1994 until its move to the DeNaples Center in 2008.
- Gannon, Lavis, & McCormick Halls: Gannon houses 72 female students, Lavis houses 82 female students, McCormick houses 65 female students. The complex contains three kitchens, large lounges on each first floor, and smaller lounges on each of the other three floors. The three buildings are connected on each floor by an enclosed walkway. The complex was constructed in 1990–91 at a cost of approximately $3.7 million in response to the shrinking pool of students from the Scranton area and an increased number of students coming from outside the region and needing on-campus housing. The university developed Nevils Beach, an open space often used for recreational activities, into the new dorm complex.
  - GLM Patio is adjacent to the GLM residential complex is the Freshman Patio, which frequently hosts musical and comedic performances as well as outdoor movies and serves as a popular spot for tanning, sledding, and barbecuing.
  - Gannon Hall was named for Rev. Edward J. Gannon, S.J., who was a member of the university's philosophy department for 22 years before his death in 1986.
  - Lavis Hall was named for the late Robert G. Lavis, a lifelong resident of Scranton who established two scholarship funds at the university.
  - McCormick Hall was named for Rev. James Carroll McCormick, the Bishop of Scranton from 1966 to 1983. Bishop McCormick was present and gave a blessing at the dedication of the Gannon-Lavis-McCormick complex.
- Hafey Hall: houses 56 students, contains a kitchen
  - Hafey Hall was built in 1962, as part of the "Upper Quad," which also includes Denis Edward Hall, Hannan Hall, and Lynett Hall. Hafey Hall is named in honor of Bishop William Hafey, the fourth Bishop of Scranton who played an instrumental role in bringing the Jesuits to Lackawanna County, was dedicated to serving the poor, and was named an assistant to the pontifical throne in 1945.
- Hannan Hall: houses 77 students, is co-ed by floor, is home to the Wellness Living-Learning Community in which students commit to a lifestyle focused on different aspects of wellness
  - Hannan was built in 1961, as part of the "Upper Quad," which also includes Hafey Hall, Denis Edward Hall, and Lynett Hall. Hannan Hall, along with Lynett Hall, was constructed on the site of the former Joseph Casey and Donald Fulton residences on Clay Avenue and Linden Street. The project cost was estimated at $400,000 and was supported by a $375,000 loan from the Federal Housing and Finance Agency's Community Facilities Administration. Hannan Hall is named in honor of Most Reverend Jerome D. Hannan, who succeeded Hafey as Bishop of Scranton for eleven years, helped establish the St. Pius X Seminary, donated $100,000 to the expansion of the university, and was appointed as a consultor to the Pontifical Commission of Bishops by Pope John XXIII.
- Lynett Hall: houses 47 students
  - Lynett Hall was built in 1961, as part of the "Upper Quad," which also includes Hafey Hall, Hannan Hall, and Denis Edward Hall. Lynett Hall, along with Hannan Hall, was constructed on the site of the former Joseph Casey and Donald Fulton residences on Clay Avenue and Linden Street. The project cost was estimated at $400,000 and was supported by a $375,000 loan from the Federal Housing and Finance Agency's Community Facilities Administration. Lynett Hall is named in honor of Edward J. Lynett, who was the editor and publisher of The Scranton Times, played an important role in raising 1.5 million dollars for the expansion of the university, and was a generous, long-time benefactor of the University of Scranton.
- Martin Hall: houses 51 students, is co-ed by floor, contains a kitchen, is home to the Cura Personalis Living-Learning Community in which students make a commitment to providing service to others
  - Martin Hall was built in 1958, as part of the "Lower Quad," which also includes Casey Hall, Fitch Hall, and McCourt Hall. These buildings were the first four student residences on campus and were constructed at a cost of $757,000, financed by a loan from the College Housing-Program of the Federal Home and Housing Finance Agency. Portions of the Lower Quad location were formerly the sites of the Moffat residence (306 Quincy Avenue), donated to the university by the Epsteins in April 1955, and the Leonard/Shean family residence (312 Quincy Avenue), donated to the university by the Scranton Lodge of Elks. Prior to the construction of the Lower Quad, three homes on the 300 block of Quincy Avenue were used as student residences and were named Fitch, Martin, and McCourt Halls. In 1958, these names were transferred to the newly constructed residence halls, and the old houses were razed in order to make room for Gunster Memorial Student Center. Martin Hall is named in honor of Attorney M. J. Martin, who donated six lots on Linden Street to the university, and after his death, his wife, Inez, donated over half a million dollars to the college.
- McCourt Hall: houses 51 students, is co-ed by floor, contains a kitchen and lounge area
  - McCourt Hall was built in 1958, as part of the "Lower Quad," which also includes Casey Hall, Martin Hall, and Fitch Hall. These buildings were the first four student residences on campus and were constructed at a cost of $757,000, which was financed by a loan from the College Housing-Program of the Federal Home and Housing Finance Agency. Portions of the Lower Quad location were formerly the sites of the Moffat residence (306 Quincy Avenue), donated to the university by the Epsteins in April 1955, and the Leonard/Shean family residence (312 Quincy Avenue), donated to the university by the Scranton Lodge of Elks. Prior to the construction of the Lower Quad, three homes on the 300 block of Quincy Avenue were used as student residences and were named Fitch, Martin, and McCourt Halls. In 1958, these names were transferred to the newly constructed residence halls, and the old houses were razed in order to make room for Gunster Memorial Student Center. McCourt Hall is named in honor of Attorney John M. McCourt, an outstanding Pennsylvania lawyer who was appointed as United States Attorney in Scranton. He was a trustee of the original St. Thomas College and his gifts of time, expertise, and funds were important to the university's early growth.
- Nevils Hall: houses 143 students, is co-ed by floor, contains a community lounge
  - In 1964, the University of Scranton acquired title to the future site of Driscoll and Nevils Halls at Mulberry Street and Clay Avenue from the Scranton Redevelopment Authority as part of the University Urban Renewal Project. Driscoll and Nevils Halls were built at a cost of $721,175 and originally build to house 120 students in each building, 240 in total. Both Driscoll and Nevils Halls are four-story buildings constructed with reinforced concrete members, which are exposed in the exterior brick walls. Rooms are 12 by 16 feet and were designed to accommodate two students along with desks, shelves, and closets. A garden mall divides the two buildings. Nevils Hall is named in honor of Father William Coleman Nevils, who was the first member of the Jesuit community to serve as the president of the university from 1942 until 1947. Fr. Nevils was instrumental in transitioning the administration of the university from the Christian Brothers to the Jesuits.

=== Sophomore dorms ===
Sophomore students are offered suite-style housing, in which two double rooms share a shower and toilet, with each room having its own sink. Sophomore housing is air conditioned. All of the buildings have kitchens. Each building has washers and dryers on the first floor for student use as well as light housekeeping services provided to all rooms and bathrooms. The three buildings are located together in a cluster on the university's campus to replicate the close housing arrangement experienced by first-year residential students.

- Condron Hall: houses 392 students
  - Condron Hall was completed in 2008. In addition to its dorm rooms, the building's seven floors contain a multipurpose meeting room, shared kitchen spaces, multimedia lounges, and study areas. Condron Hall incorporates many environmentally friendly techniques, such as water- and energy-saving fixtures, the use of products produced within a 500-mile radius of the campus and green floor coverings. The building is named in honor of alumnus and long-time benefactor of the University of Scranton Christopher "Kip" Condron and his wife Margaret Condron, Ph.D., who served as the national co-chairs of the largest capital campaign in the 120-year history of the university, the $100 million Pride, Passion, Promise Campaign to transform the campus and secure the future.
- Gavigan Hall: houses 235 students
  - In 1988, the university began construction on Gavigan Hall. The facility features lounges on each floor, study rooms, and a kitchen as well as a study area for its residents on the top floor which features two-story-high glass windows with views of the campus and of the city. The building is dedicated in memory of John R. Gavigan to honor his thirty-eight years of service to the university and his devotion to the institution's students.
- Redington Hall: houses 242 students
  - Finished in 1985, Redington Hall was designed as a residence complex to house 244 students and accommodations for Jesuit-faculty counselors. In addition to dorm rooms, the building also contains numerous study and lounge areas as well as Collegiate Hall, a large conference room for study, assembly, and ceremonial functions which was modeled after an early Christian basilica, with a clerestory and side aisles, culminating in a four hundred square foot window. The clerestory walls are inscribed in both Latin and English with the founding date of the university and lyrics from its alma mater. The buildings of Redington Hall form a "U" that is open to the south to take advantage of the year-round sunshine and to highlight an excellent view of south Scranton. The west wing contains Collegiate Hall, angled to face the Commons. At the northwest corner of the residence hall, there is a three-storied entry rotunda containing the stairs, lounges, circulation space, a clock tower with a carillon and a glass-pyramid roof and crucifix designed by Rev. Panuska. The carillon system was produced by the Maas-Rowe Co. of Escondido, California. The five largest bells in the bell tower were cast in Loughborough, England by John Taylor and Company and range in diameter from 18 to 30 inches and in weight from 147 to 560 pounds. Each is inscribed: one features a quotation from the Ignatian Spiritual Exercises, another marks the 1888 establishment of the university and cites the university motto (Religio - Mores - Cultura), and three others display the text of the second verse of the university's alma mater. The crucifix features a geometric corpus with head bowed, symbolizing the moment of death and illustrating the expansive love manifested by the freely chosen death of Christ. The facility is named for Francis E. Redington and his wife, Elizabeth Brennan Redington.

=== Upperclassmen and graduate housing ===
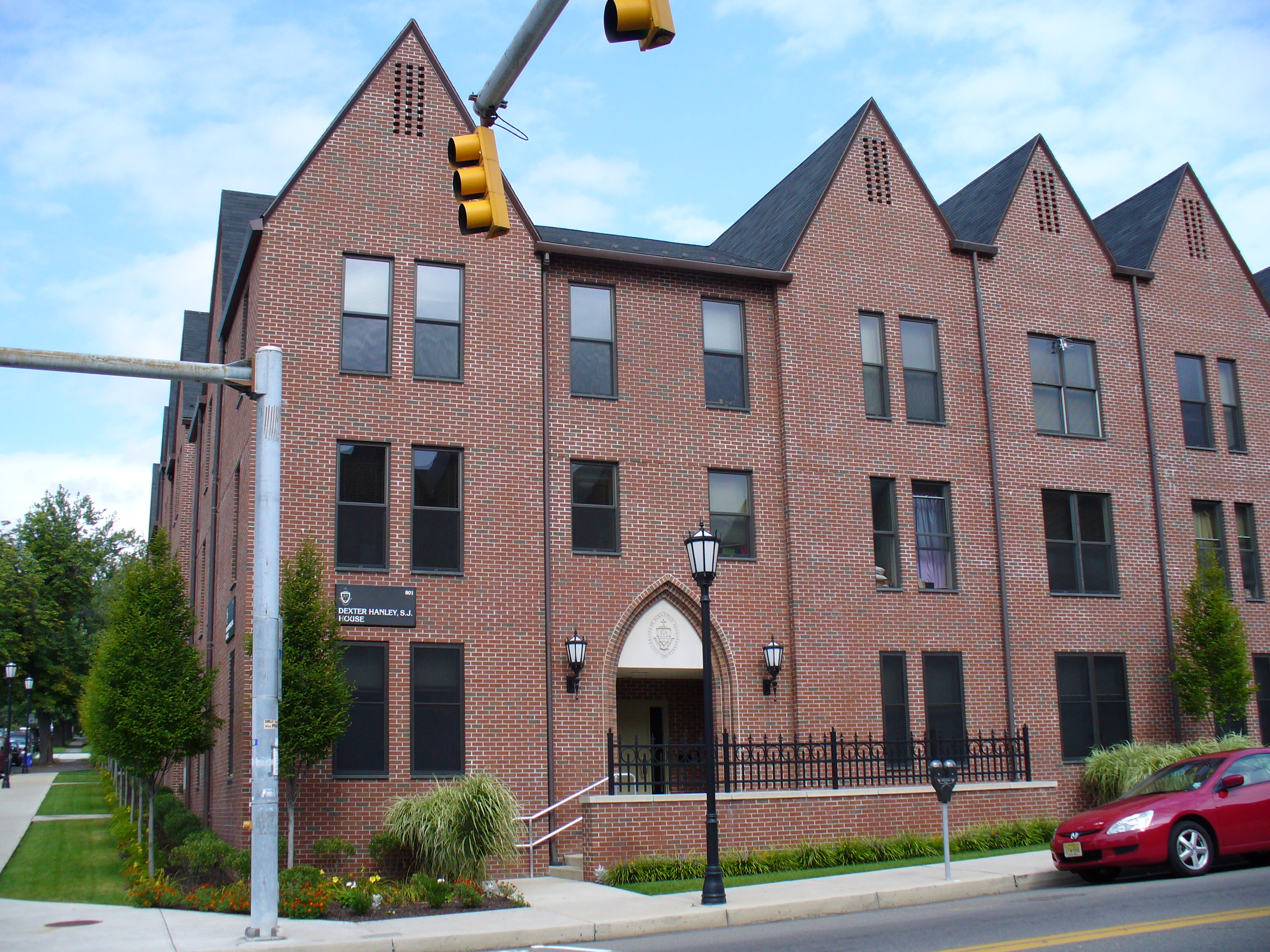
Madison Square Apartments, including the Dexter Hanley House

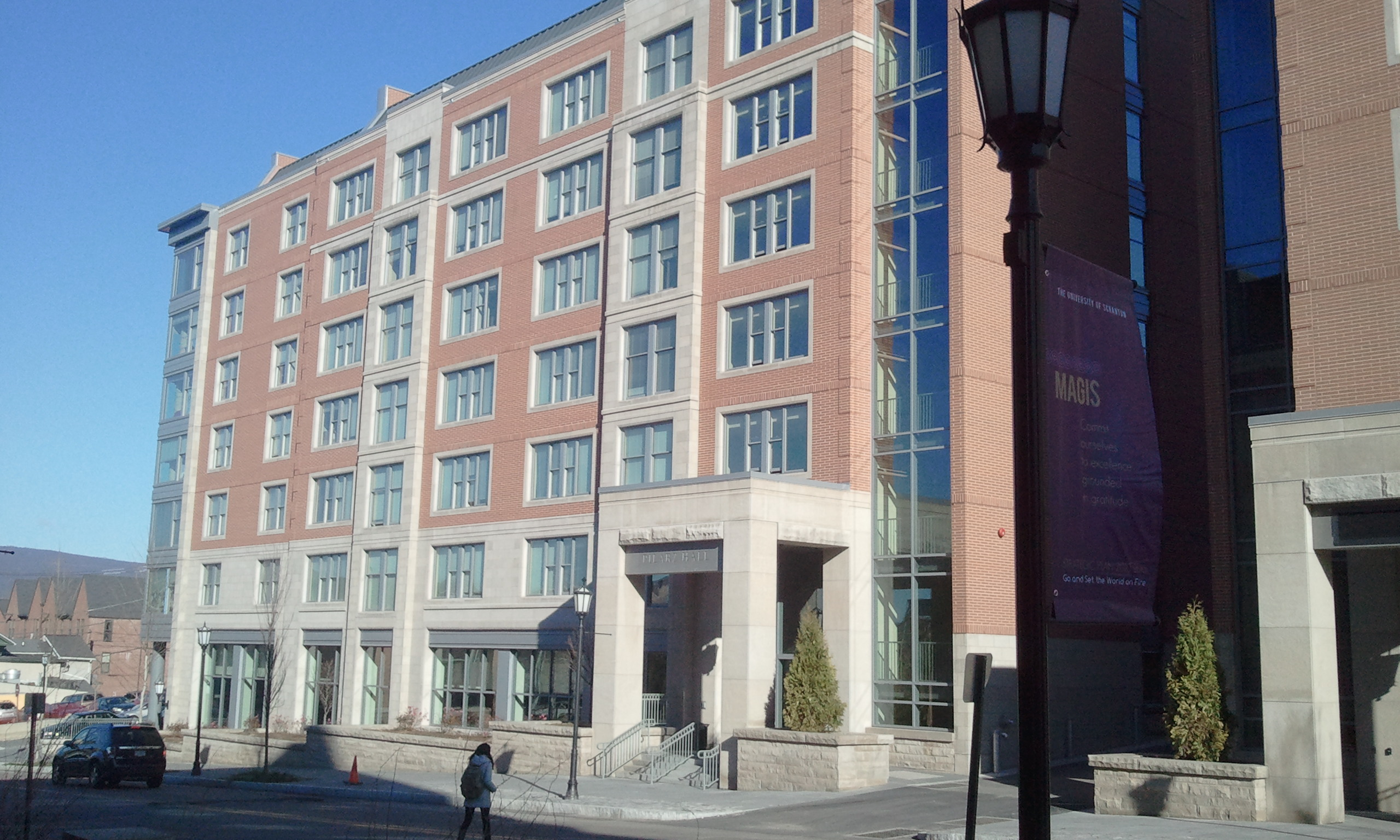
Pilarz Hall

Upperclassmen and graduate students are offered apartments and houses.

- Linden St. Apartments: In 1999, the university purchased the Linden Street apartments from a private business owner to replace the residence houses demolished to make room for Brennan Hall. Located on the 1300 block of Linden Street, the Linden Plaza apartments are arranged as three-bedroom units, each complete with a kitchen, a living room, and a full bathroom. Katharine Drexel has an occupancy of 27, Dorothy Day has an occupancy of 27, and Elizabeth Ann Seton has an occupancy of 29. The apartments are divided into three named residences, each one in honor of women of faith and commitment to service of others: Dorothy Day, a prominent Catholic social activist and journalist who founded the Catholic Worker movement; Saint Katharine Drexel, the founder of the Sisters of the Blessed Sacrament who served as a missionary for Native Americans and African Americans; and Elizabeth Ann Seton, founder of the Sisters of Charity, a religious order that helped to establish the parochial school system in the United States.
- Madison Square: has 3 different apartment buildings with a capacity of 114. All Apartments offer a semi-private building entrance and a private apartment entrance. Madison Square rooms are mainly single occupancy, with limited double occupancy rooms. All of the apartments have full kitchens and living rooms.
  - Completed in 2003, the Madison Square Apartments is a complex of three townhouses, each three stories. In total, the complex accommodates 114 students in 25 different apartments. Each building has three, four, five and six bedroom apartment suites. Each apartment style suite includes a kitchen and sitting room, and one bathroom for every two to three bedrooms. The three townhouses surround an outdoor garden area and courtyard. In one townhouse, the basement contains a lounge, conference area, and laundry area. The design of the Madison Square apartments closely resembles the layout of the award-winning Mulberry Plaza Apartments, which was recognized by the Boston Society of Architects, the largest branch of the American Institute of Architects, in its 2002 Housing Design Awards Program for design excellence. However, several distinct differences were tweaked by the architect to improve the complex. All apartments and bedrooms will be uniform in size, as opposed to the varying size of bedrooms and sizes of apartments in the Mulberry Complex, more central storage space and walls with a greater width of insulation will be added, and more common room space outside of individual apartments will be allotted. Construction involved the demolition of the Carter Apartments, a multistory residential complex that previously occupied the site. To date, only one of the three units has been named. In 2006, one unit was dedicated as Dexter Hanley House, in memory of Rev. Dexter L. Hanley, S.J., university president from 1970 to 1975. During his tenure as president, Father Hanley oversaw the university's move to coeducation, increased enrollment, and approved a major revision of the undergraduate curriculum offering students much more flexibility while maintaining a common core rooted in the values of Jesuit education. To honor Father Hanley's service and dedication to the university after his death in 1977, the university renamed the Evening College to the Dexter Hanley college. When the Hanley College was later merged with the Graduate School, Fr. Hanley's memory was preserved on campus as one of the student townhouses in the Madison Square complex was named the Dexter L. Hanley House.
- Pilarz and Montrone Halls: house 396 students in two different buildings. All of the apartments in the new buildings are either 2 or 4 person occupancy and all of the rooms are single occupancy. While Montrone holds 40 four-bedroom suites, accommodating up to 160 students, Pilarz holds 54 four-bedroom suites and 10 two-bedroom suites, accommodating 236 students.
  - In 2010, ground was broken on the Mulberry Street apartment complex. Funded by the $125 million "Pride, Passion and Promise" fundraising campaign launched in 2008, the $33 million complex was because of the growing demand for more on-campus housing options, particularly apartment-style unites, as "more students every year want to live in [the University’s] residence halls and campus apartments." Before the construction of Montrone and Pilarz Halls, the site of the 1000 block of Mulberry Street was occupied by the Storier Apartments, and Aroma Cafe, a popular student hangout. Additionally, 406 Monroe Avenue, a portion of the Pilarz Hall site, was once the residence of local real estate developer William L. Hackett.
  - Montrone Hall is named in honor of Sandra Montrone H'03 and Paul Montrone '62, H'86. A magna cum laude graduate of The University of Scranton and native of this city, Mr. Montrone distinguished himself as a student in academics and as leader on campus. After college, Mr. Motrone went on to earn a doctorate from Columbia University, and served as chairman, president & CEO of Fisher Scientific International Inc. until its merger with Thermo Electron Corporation to form Thermo Fisher Scientific Inc. Mr. Montrone has directed the development of other public and private companies, including the Signal Companies, Inc., and its successor Allied Signal, Inc.; the Henley Group; Wheelabrator Technologies Inc.; Latona Associates; the Metropolitan Opera; Liberty Lane Partners Inc.; and Perspecta Trust LLC. During the Clinton administration, Mr. Montrone served as a member of the President's Advisory Commission on Consumer Protection and Quality in the Healthcare Industry, as well as a founder of the National Forum for Healthcare Quality Measurement and Reporting. In addition to an honorary degree, the university has recognized Mr. Montrone as a recipient of the President's Medal in 2003. Mrs. Montrone, a graduate of Marywood College and also a native of Scranton, serves as president of The Penates Foundation, was a founding director and later president of the board of directors of Seacoast Hospice, which earned national recognition when it was selected as a distinguished service organization by the United Nations and a Point of Light by the first President Bush, and, under President Clinton, she served on the President's Advisory Committee on the Arts. In recognition of the Montrones' great accomplishments and to commemorate their generosity towards the University of Scranton, one of the Mulberry Street apartment complexes was named after them.
  - Pilarz Hall was named in honor of the university's 24th president, Rev. Scott R. Pilarz, S.J. who served from 2003 until 2011. The university's dedication of one of the Mulberry Street Apartment buildings commemorates Rev. Pilarz's great service to the university. As current University of Scranton President, Kevin Quinn, S.J., remarked, "During his tenure as president, Father Pilarz led unprecedented growth at Scranton that goes beyond bricks and mortar, skillfully nurturing our genuine care for students and the unique attributes that each brings to our community. His contribution has – and continues to – transform lives." He was beloved by students and known for accomplishing transformational projects on campus. Rev. Pilarz's list of achievements at Scranton is extensive – reaching from the unprecedented fundraising success of the Pride, Passion, Promise Campaign, to enhancing the university's reputation on a national stage, to the campus’ capital projects. Under Rev. Pilarz, the University of Scranton expanded its international mission and service opportunities, as well as its support for programs to enhance its Catholic and Jesuit identity. More than 100 new faculty members were hired and, five endowed chairs were established. The university saw undergraduate applications grow to record levels and its graduate programs expand dramatically through online degree programs and a renewed focus on campus-based programs. The university also earned the highly selective Community Engagement Classification designated by the Carnegie Foundation for the Advancement of Teaching. Father Pilarz's impact can also be seen in transformational campus improvements. These include the Patrick and Margaret DeNaples Center; the Christopher and Margaret Condron Hall; the John and Jacquelyn Dionne Campus Green; the expansion of the Retreat Center at Chapman Lake; the renovation of The estate as a new home for Admissions; the renovation of the former Visitors’ Center into the Chapel of the Sacred Heart; the Loyola Science Center, and the Mulberry Street Apartment Complex. In addition to his work at the University of Scranton, he also was the president of Marquette University from 2011 until 2013 and currently serves as the president of Georgetown Preparatory School, since 2014. He has received numerous awards for teaching, service and scholarship, including the John Carroll Award from Georgetown University, which is a life achievement award and the highest honor bestowed by the Georgetown University Alumni Association. He was awarded honorary degrees from King's College, Wilkes-Barre, and Marywood University, Scranton.
- Mulberry Plaza: has 4 different apartment buildings with a capacity of 141.
  - Completed in 2000, the Mulberry Plaza Apartments is a complex of four townhouses, each three stories. In total, the complex accommodates 140 students. Each townhouse provides a mix of duplex and flat-style apartments with anywhere from one to six bedrooms. Each apartment style suite includes a kitchen and sitting room, and one bathroom for every three to four bedrooms. The three townhouses surround an outdoor garden area and courtyard. Mulberry Plaza was recognized by the Boston Society of Architecture, the largest branch of the American Institute of Architects, in their 2002 Housing Design Awards Program for design excellence. The design of the Madison Square apartments, which were built in 2002, closely resembles the layout of the award-winning Mulberry Plaza Apartments. Construction involved the demolition of Wyoming House, formerly known as Jefferson Towne House, which had been acquired by the university in March 1982 from Itzkowitz Catering and had been used by the university as a student residence. The three-floor, Colonial Revival-style Towne House had been originally constructed in 1901 as the L.A. Gates residence at 800 Mulberry Street. Before being used as one of the university's student residences and home to Itzkowitz Catering, it had also served as Snowdon's Funeral Home, a medical office, and a music conservatory. Additionally, part of the Mulberry Plaza was once the site of the residence of T. J. Foster, the president of the International Correspondence Schools of Scranton at 338 Madison Avenue, which was also razed to build Mulberry Plaza. To date, only two of the townhouses have been named. Keating House is named in memory of Robert J. and Flora S. Keating, the parents of Flora K. Karam, who is the wife of university trustee and alumnus Thomas F. Karam. The dedication of the townhouse in their name honors their continued commitment to the community throughout the years. Timlin House honors the Most Rev. James C. Timlin, D. D., who served as the eighth Bishop of Scranton from 1984 to 2003. Before becoming the Bishop of Scranton, Rev. Timlin served as assistant pastor at St. John the Evangelist Church and St. Peter's Cathedral, as Assistant Chancellor of the Diocese and Secretary to the Most Rev. J. Carroll McCormick, D.D., Sixth Bishop of Scranton, and a number of other prestigious positions within the Diocese until Pope John Paul II appointed him Eighth Bishop of Scranton.
- Quincy Apartments: in 2015, the university opened a new housing facility, located in the historic Hill Section on the 500 block of Quincy Avenue. Originally built in the early 1900s, the former Madison Junior High School was vacated for a number of years before being renovated and converted into an early childhood learning center and graduate student housing complex. The 43,000 square foot building is listed on the National Park Service's National Register of Historic Places. The early learning center occupies the first floor of the three-story building. The school can accommodate approximately 120 children and is run by the Hildebrandt Learning Centers, a Dallas-based organization. The second and third floors have been converted into 24 one-, two- and three-bedroom apartments that have a configuration that is comparable to the university's other apartment-style offerings. These apartments are reserved exclusively for graduate students, which can be rented for $900 per month per student, including utilities and amenities.
- Resident Houses: in addition to the apartment-style buildings on campus, the university also owns a number of residential houses scattered throughout the campus and the historic Hill Section of the city which they use to house students depending on the need for additional housing, most of which were originally acquired during the 1970s and 1980s. These include: Blair House, Fayette House, Gonzaga House, Herold House, Liva House, McGowan House, Cambria House, Monroe House, Tioga House, and Wayne House.

== Landmarks and campus art ==
- The Christ The Teacher Sculpture
  - Description: the sculpture depicts Jesus, with Mary sitting in down in front of him.
  - Location: the sculpture stands at the foot of the Commons, near the corner of Linden Street and Monroe Avenue.
  - Artist: Trevor Southey, 1998
  - Inscription: "For Christ plays in ten thousand places/ Lovely in Limbs, and lovely on eyes not his/ To the Father through the features of men’s faces" - Gerard Manley Hopkins, S.J.
- Martyrs' Grove
  - Description: the stone memorial dedicated to the victims of the massacre at the University of Central America in San Salvador, El Salvador on November 16, 1989. The memorial remembers the murder of six Jesuit priests, their housekeeper and her daughter.
  - Location: the memorial stands near the entrance to Campion Hall, the Jesuit residence on campus.
  - Inscription: "'What does it mean to be a Jesuit today? To be a Jesuit means to commit yourself under the standard of the Cross to the crucial struggle of our time, the struggle for faith and the struggle for justice which that same faith demands' (Decree #2, "Jesuits Today." G.C. 32. 1975). The names of those killed by Salvadoran soldiers are listed on the monument, which are Juan Ramon Moreno Pardo, S.J.; Ignacio Ellacuria, S.J.; Joaquin Lopez y Lopez, S.J.; Amando Lopez Quintana, S.J.; Ignacio Martin-Baro, S.J.; Segundo Montes Mozo, S.J.; Elba Julia Ramos; and Celina Maricet Ramos."
- St. Ignatius (Metanoia)
  - Description: the twenty foot high bronze statue of St. Ignatius of Loyola depicts the conversion of its subject from Inigo, the soldier, to St. Ignatius, who founded the Jesuits in 1540, representing the transformative power of Jesuit education.
  - Location: the intersection of the Royal Way and the Commons.
  - Artist: Gerhard Baut, 1988
- Jacob and the Angel
  - Description: the ten foot high bronze sculpture depicts the story of Jacob’s struggle with the Angel of the Lord, which symbolizes the active confrontation between man and his moral dilemmas.
  - Location: the sculpture stands at the top of the Commons.
  - Artist: Arlene Love, 1982
  - Inscription: Genesis 32:26-29 - "And he said, Let me go for the day breaketh. And he said, I will not let thee go, except thou bless me. And he said unto him, Why is thy name? And he said, Jacob. And he said, Thy name shall be called no more Jacob, but Israel: for as a prince hast thou power with God and with me, and hast prevailed. And Jacob asked him, and said, Tell me, I pray thee, thy name. And he said, Wherefore is it that thou dost ask after my name? And he blessed him there."
- Woman in Repose
  - Description: a modern, metal statue of a seated woman representing tranquility.
  - Location: the statue is located in the Galvin Terrace outside the Weinberg Memorial Library, and previously was displayed in front of Gunster Memorial Student Center before it was demolished.
- Hope Horn Gallery
  - Description: an art gallery with a wall of windows, a cathedral ceiling, and moveable walls as well as an adjoining workshop and classroom space for lectures and workshops.
  - Location: the fourth floor of Hyland Hall.
  - Honoring: In 2004, the Art Gallery was named in honor of Hope Horn, a painter and sculptor who bequeathed her estate to the University of Scranton to support art and music education.
- Doorway to the Soul
  - Description: a steel and wire sculpture which consists of consists of 18 framed images fabricated variously of steel plate, perforated steel, round steel bars and wire cloth. The individual panels within the grid are titled: The Thinker; Reaching Out To My Self; Natural and Curious Yearning of a Child; Eternal Bridge; Acceptance; A State of Calm, Peace, Knowing; Trials and Tribulation/The Ascent; The Void/God; The Writer; Father, Son, and Holy Spirit; Hope/Prayer; Christ; The Climb/The Worn Steps/The Invitation to Enter; The Written Word; Unconditional Love and Caring/Innocence of Children; The Self Exposed. The two external panels are: The Self Observing and The Only Begotten Son.
  - Location: the exterior of the McDade Center for Literary and Performing Arts.
  - Artist: Lisa Fedon, 1995
- Heritage Room
  - Description: thirty-nine panels which depict art, religion, and science in the Lackawanna Valley and in the world.
  - Location: the fifth floor of the Weinberg Memorial Library.
  - Artist: Trevor Southey, 1992
- Dante
  - Description:the thirteen foot Carrara marble structure was originally built in 1922 and displayed in downtown Scranton before it was acquired by the university in the mid-1960s. It depicts Dante Alighieri, a fourteenth-century Italian poet, holding his most famous work, the Divine Comedy.
  - Location: the statue is located in front of Alumni Memorial Hall, on the university's Estate grounds.
  - Artist: Augustino N. Russo, 1922

== Former university buildings and spaces ==
=== Arts Building ===
In 1945, with the end of World War II and the creation of the G.I. Bill enrollment exploded at the University of Scranton. In order to accommodate this dramatic increase in enrollment, the university acquired three "barracks" buildings from the government in 1947, which they placed on the 900 block of Linden Street, part of the former Scranton Estate. They were named A or Arts Building, B or Business Building, and E or Engineering Building, and each housed classrooms and offices pertaining to those specific subjects. Purchased from the Navy for one dollar plus transportation and remodeling costs, the Barracks were naval buildings being used in Portsmouth, Virginia that were dismantled and then reassembled in Scranton. Originally intended as temporary measures to accommodate the larger student body, the Barracks buildings were used for nearly fifteen years before being replaced by permanent structures.

The Arts Building featured the "Pennant Room," a lounge that was decorated with pennants from other Jesuit colleges and universities. It was demolished in 1962 after the completion of St. Thomas Hall.

=== Bradford House ===
In 1973, the University of Scranton acquired the Bradford House, formerly the Rose Apartment Building. Bradford House was named for Bradford County in Pennsylvania. Located in the Hill Section, the Bradford House was three-story apartment building which was converted into student apartments as part of an effort to accommodate the growing number of boarding students. Equipped with a kitchen and bathroom, each apartment housed about six students. In 1978, as part of a major accessibility initiative in order to comply with new federal regulations, the first floor of the Bradford House was converted into a wheelchair-accessible apartment for women students. In 1998, Bradford House was razed in order to make room for the Kania School of Management's Brennan Hall.

=== Business Building ===
In 1945, with the end of World War II and the creation of the G.I. Bill enrollment exploded at the University of Scranton. In order to accommodate this dramatic increase in enrollment, the university acquired three "barracks" buildings from the government in 1947, which they placed on the 900 block of Linden Street, part of the former Scranton Estate. They were named A or Arts Building, B or Business Building, and E or Engineering Building, and each housed classrooms and offices pertaining to those specific subjects. Purchased from the Navy for one dollar plus transportation and remodeling costs, the barracks were naval buildings being used in Portsmouth, Virginia that were dismantled and then reassembled in Scranton. Originally intended as temporary measures to accommodate the larger student body, the Barracks buildings were used for nearly fifteen years before being replaced by permanent structures.

The university's first cafeteria opened in the Business Building in February 1948, with accommodations for 250 students. The cafeteria later moved to the Engineering Building. The Business Building was demolished in 1961 to make room for the construction of St. Thomas Hall.

=== Claver Hall ===
Claver Hall served as an administrative building, housing the Physical Plant and Purchasing departments. It was demolished in 2010 to make room for Pilarz Hall and Montrone Hall. It was named for St. Peter Claver, S.J., a Spanish Jesuit priest and missionary.

=== Engineering Building ===
In 1945, with the end of World War II and the creation of the G.I. Bill enrollment exploded at the University of Scranton. In order to accommodate this dramatic increase in enrollment, the university acquired three "barracks" buildings from the government in 1947 which they placed on the 900 block of Linden Street, part of the former Scranton Estate. They were named A or Arts Building, B or Business Building, and E or Engineering Building, and each housed classrooms and offices pertaining to those specific subjects. Purchased from the Navy for one dollar plus transportation and remodeling costs, the Barracks were naval buildings being used in Portsmouth, Virginia that were dismantled and then reassembled in Scranton. Originally intended as temporary measures to accommodate the larger student body, the Barracks buildings were used for nearly fifteen years before being replaced by permanent structures.

E Building held the university's physics laboratories, with special equipment for experimentation in optics, electricity and magnetism. The building also housed a lecture hall, physics department offices, and a photography darkroom. After Loyola Hall of Science was completed in 1956, most of the science classrooms and laboratories were moved there and the Engineering Building underwent renovations. The school constructed the St. Ignatius Chapel, a cafeteria, and lounges.

In 1960, E Building was dismantled in order to make room for St. Thomas Hall. It was then shipped to St. Jude's Parish in Mountain Top, Pennsylvania to be used as a grade school annex. It was subsequently demolished in the 1980s.

=== Gallery Building ===
In 1979, the University of Scranton purchased the Pennsylvania Drug Warehouse for $150,000 from Kay Wholesale Drugs of Wilkes-Barre. After significant renovations, the three-story building was dedicated as the Gallery Building on April 28, 1982, in honor of former University President J. Eugene Gallery, S.J. who served as the second Jesuit president from 1947 until 1953. When the building was opened, it housed a Media Resource Center, two large multipurpose lecture rooms, Career Services, a Counseling Center, the Audio Visual department, the Computer Science department, computer laboratories, an Art Gallery, and a study area. A ten-foot wide wire mesh satellite dish on the roof served as a receiver for educational programs, part of the university's participation in the National University Teleconference Network. In the 1990s, the Gallery also housed the Dexter Hanley College and the Office of Annual Giving.

The Gallery was demolished in October 2001 to make room for Founders' Green, outside of Brennan Hall. Many of the departments housed in the Gallery were moved into the remodeled O’Hara Hall, while the Art Gallery was moved into the fourth floor of Hyland Hall.

=== Gunster Memorial Student Center ===
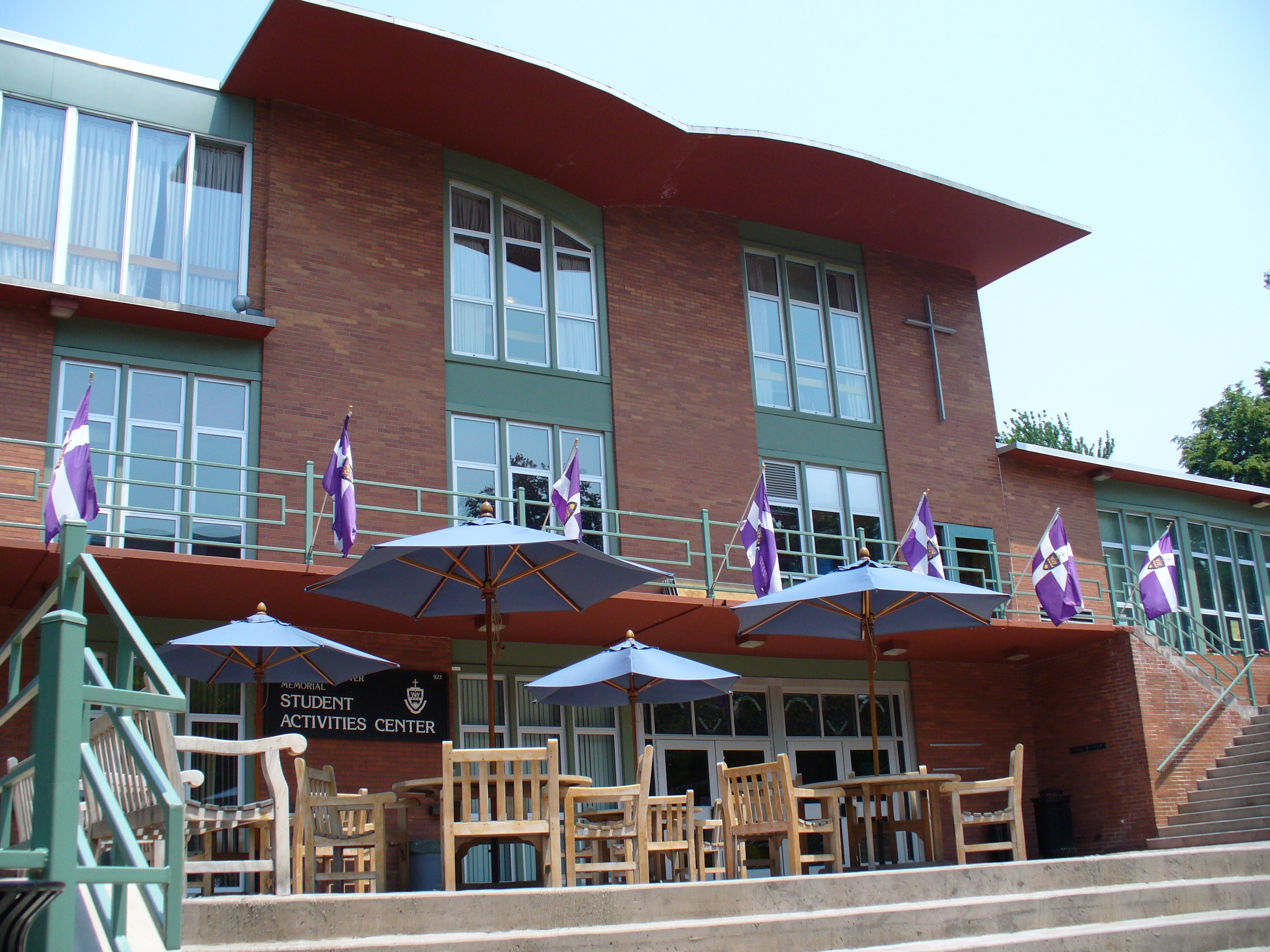
Former University of Scranton Building, Gunster Memorial Student Center

In 1955, the University of Scranton announced an ambitious $5,000,000 campus expansion plan, which proposed constructing ten new buildings over the course of the next ten years so that the school's physical plant would be concentrated at the former Scranton family Estate, the temporary barrack structures would be replaced with safer and more permanent buildings, and its facilities would be expanded to better serve its growing student body. One of these proposed buildings was a Student Center. Construction began in 1959 on the $1,030,000 three-story brick, steel, and concrete building. When it was completed in 1960, the Student Center housed a cafeteria, bookstore, student activities offices, staff and student lounges, a snack bar, game room, a rifle room, and a large ballroom/auditorium. The cafeteria was designed to seat 600 and to provide between 1200 and 1500 lunches each day (for a full-time student body of 1,358), along with 400 to 600 breakfasts and dinners for resident students (then numbering less than 250).

Over the years, the Student Center was renovated and expanded to fit the needs of the growing student body. In 1974, a $228,000 renovation converted the third floor patio into a grill room, providing another dining area for students with a seating capacity of 300. In December 1980, during the dedication of the University Commons, the Student Center was also rededicated and renamed as the Joseph F. Gunster Memorial Student Center, in memory of Joseph F. Gunster, a St. Thomas College alumnus, generous university benefactor, and Florida attorney who had previously practiced law in Lackawanna County for over twenty years, whose $1,150,000 estate gift had been the largest in the university's history. The completion of the University Commons closed the 900 and 1000 blocks of Linden Street to vehicular traffic, creating a campus and making it easier and safer for students to walk between Gunster, Galvin Terrace, the Long Center, St. Thomas Hall, and their residence halls. During the construction, the entrance to Gunster from the Commons was updated to include a gathering area and speaker's forum. In 1989, Gunster was renovated, as one of its rooms named the Archives was modernized. In the Archives, seating was added for an additional 75 to 125 people, an 800-square-foot dance with a disc jockey booth was created, and a retractable video screen was installed. The snack bar was also expanded, offering a wider variety of food choices. Because the bookstore was moved to Hyland Hall from Gunster Memorial Student Center, they also expanded the third floor cafeteria. A summer 1993 expansion of Gunster by architects Leung, Hemmler, and Camayd created a 19,000 sq. ft. addition for dining services, increasing the seating capacity from 630 to 1,000. The addition included a new food court located on the third floor and created more space for food preparation as well as student activities and organizations. In summer 2004, the staircase and brick patio outside of Gunster Student Center were replaced due to safety concerns, and the second floor dining room was renovated.

By 2001, with the realization that Gunster could not be effectively renovated any further and was unable to adequately meet the needs of the university student body which had grown dramatically since its completion in 1960, the university initiated plans for a new student center, which culminated in the construction of the DeNaples Center in 2008. Upon the completion and opening of the DeNaples Center, the Gunster Memorial Student Center was demolished. In its place, the university created the Dionne Green, a 25,000-square-foot green space roughly the size of a football field featuring a 3,600 sq ft outdoor amphitheater, located directly in front of the DeNaples Center.

=== Hill House ===
Donated in 1984 to the university by an anonymous faculty member, the Hill House was located on the corner of North Webster and Linden Street. It was used as a faculty residence, a guest house, and a facility for meetings and social gatherings. Hill House was named for Rev. William B. Hill, S.J., who in 1984 was marking his 15th year of service to the University of Scranton, having served as having served as an English professor, the academic vice president from 1975 until 1978, the chair of the English department from 1973 until 1975, special assistant to the president from 1987 until 2002, the chaplain of the board of trustees, and the chaplain of the Pro Deo et Universitate Society. Hill House was razed in the summer of 2007 to make way for Condron Hall.

=== Hopkins House ===
In 1985, the University of Scranton acquired the Hopkins House, located at 1119 Linden Street. It originally served as the home for the university's student publication offices, which included the Aquinas student newspaper, the Windhover yearbook, and the literary magazine Esprit. The House was named in honor of Gerard Manley Hopkins, a leading English poet, convert to Catholicism, and Jesuit priest.

In 1988, because of a shortage of available on-campus beds, the university converted Hopkins House into a student residence. The housing crunch resulted from the city's crackdown on illegal rooming houses, as well as concerns about security and the conditions of off-campus houses, which all lead to an increasing demand for on-campus housing. In 1990, the university converted the Hopkins House into the Service House, a themed house meant to bring together students, faculty, and staff with an interest in community service to act as a catalyst to expand the university's involvement in volunteer work through getting as many people involved as possible and coordinating the volunteer activities of the other student residences.

Before it was acquired by the university, Hopkins House was the home of Terry Connors, the university photographer for over four decades. In 2007, Hopkins House was demolished in order to make room for the construction of Condron Hall, a sophomore residence hall.

=== Jerrett House ===
Acquired by the university in 1977, the Jerrett House, a converted apartment building, was the first campus house dedicated to study and reserved for women students. Opened in 1978, it housed approximately 20 students. In 1980, Jerrett House made history as the first co-ed student residence on campus, when male students moved into the first floor apartments in order to increases protection around the female residences on Madison Avenue. Jerrett was retired as a student residence in Fall 2008 due to the construction of Condron Hall, as it had become dilapidated over the years.

=== Lackawanna House ===
In 1973, the university acquired Lackawanna House, named after Lackawanna County, Pennsylvania, as part of an effort to accommodate the growing number of residential students. The building cost $32,500 and required several thousand dollars of renovation to be converted into a residence for 25 students. It also housed offices for the Aquinas and the Hill Neighborhood Association. After the completion of Redington Hall, a large dormitory on campus with a capacity of approximately 240 students, in 1985 the university closed Lackawanna House because of its dilapidated condition and sold it.

=== Lancaster House ===
Acquired in 1973 by the university, Lancaster House was a house located on Clay Avenue and converted to a student residence as part of an effort to accommodate the growing number of residential students. Named for Lancaster County, Pennsylvania, it housed upperclassmen. In the 1980s, Lancaster House was demolished to make room for Gavigan Hall, a four-story residence hall that houses approximately 240 students in four-person suites.

=== LaSalle Hall ===
In 1908, construction was completed on the three-story residence for the Christian Brothers, which would later be named La Salle Hall, adjacent to Old Main, St. Thomas College's main academic building. It was constructed on a site that had been purchased by the Diocese of Scranton in 1888.

In 1942, the incoming Jesuits dedicated the building as La Salle Hall as a tribute to the departing Christian Brothers. Because the building was too small to house the large Jesuit community, who chose instead to live in the Scranton Estate, which had been donated by Worthington Scranton in 1941, the Jesuits renovated the building. The first floor housed the office of the University President, the second floor contained a small chapel for daily mass and devotions, and the third floor was converted into offices for the Jesuit faculty. The chapel was dedicated to the Sacred Heart of Jesus and featured a large painting of the apparition of the Lord to St. Margaret Mary from the cloister of the Georgetown Visitation Convent.

After the end of World War II, enrollment at the university exploded as veterans went back to college. In order to accommodate these larger numbers, the university acquired three former Navy barracks in 1947 which they constructed on the 900 block of Linden Street, part of the former Scranton Estate in the lower Hill section, as the university was unable to expand any further on Wyoming Avenue. Over the next fifteen years, the university embarked on an ambitious building project to move its entire campus to the Scranton Estate. Thus, in 1962, after the completion of St. Thomas Hall, the university no longer needed to use Old Main or La Salle Hall and they were vacated. In 1964, the University of Scranton donated La Salle Hall to the city of Scranton as a contribution to the Central City Redevelopment Project. The property was worth approximately $360,000 at the time. In 1970, the building was converted into Cathedral Convent for the Sisters of the Immaculate Heart of Mary, who staffed Bishop Hannan High School across the street.

=== Leahy Hall - The YWCA ===
Leahy Hall was originally the home of the Scranton Chapter of the Young Women's Christian Association (YWCA). The building was constructed in 1907 in the Colonial Revival style. The three-story, red brick building, designed by Scranton architect Edward Langley, featured offices, lounges, meeting rooms, a gymnasium, and a cafeteria. The YWCA held classes in physical culture, sewing, music and singing, arithmetic, grammar, Bible study, cooking, and English. It also created a debate club, served lunch to the public in its cafeteria, and became a meeting spot for local women's civic organizations. In 1927, the Platt-Woolworth building was constructed as an addition to meet the growing needs of the YWCA. Funded by Frederick J. Platt and C. S. Woolworth, the new wing to the YWCA headquarters provided housing for 100 women, as well as kitchens, laundry facilities, an auditorium, and a basement swimming pool.

As the University of Scranton expanded and began to accept women students, its women students also benefited from the YWCA's services and programs. Several women resided at the YWCA while studying at the university, including international students. Over time, however, the YWCA found it increasingly difficult to maintain the property. In 1976, the University of Scranton purchased the YWCA building for $500,000. The University of Scranton initially named the building Jefferson Hall. After the YWCA vacated the building in June 1978, moving to a new location on Stafford Avenue, significant renovations converted the structure into an off-campus residence for 91 students. The building also contained a gym for recreational athletic activities, conference rooms, a dark room, and offices for student organizations, including the Aquinas, Windhover, Hanley College Council, Debate Club, Esprit, T.V. and radio stations. A student lounge and snack bar were added in February 1979, although they were removed during later renovations in September 1984. In November 1983, the gym was transformed into a facility for the Physical Therapy department, housing three laboratories, a dark room, classrooms, and faculty offices.

In 1995, The university renamed Jefferson Hall as Edward R. Leahy, Jr., Hall in gratitude to the Leahy family for their endowment of health care education at Scranton. The son of Edward and Patricia Leahy, Edward R. Leahy, Jr., was born in 1984 with cerebral palsy and several related disabilities. He died shortly before his ninth birthday in 1993. Until the fall of 2013, Leahy Hall housed facilities, offices, classrooms, and laboratories for the departments of Physical Therapy and Occupational Therapy. Demolition of Leahy Hall began September 16, 2013, and revealed a time capsule, which held a 1907 almanac and a wealth of YWCA papers, pamphlets, and clippings dating back to the 1890s. Construction was completed on the new Edward R. Leahy, Jr. Hall in 2015 and it opened for use for the Fall 2015 semester.

=== Loyola Hall of Science ===
Loyola Hall was constructed in 1956, as part of a major campus expansion. Built at a cost of $1,205,000, the reinforced concrete structure featured a porcelain enameled steel "skin" brickwork as well as aluminum mullions along its exterior. At the time of its opening, the ground floor was dedicated to engineering, the first floor to physics, the second floor to biology, and the third floor to chemistry. The penthouse housed the university's radio station (WUSV) and its equipment, including a steel radio tower, which was subsequently dismantled in 1974. When the building was first constructed, its ultra modern design, technologically advanced features, and ability to house all of the science departments in one building made it a vital part of the University of Scranton's campus. Before the construction of Loyola Hall, engineering students had been forced to go elsewhere for the final two years of their education because the university lacked the proper equipment to teach them.

As part of the "Second Cornerstone" campaign, a fifteen million dollar expansion and improvement project, the university extensively renovated Loyola Hall in 1987. In the $2,750,000 expansion of Loyola Hall, the existing building was remodeled and an expansion towards Monroe Avenue was added, in order to accommodate the growing student body and the expanding science programs. An additional floor and a twenty-foot extension of Loyola's east wall expanded the floor space of the facility by more than 14,000 feet. The new space provided room for additional chemistry laboratories, classrooms, research areas, and computer facilities for faculty and students.

With the construction of the Loyola Science Center in 2011, Loyola Hall was functionally superseded. The science departments, classrooms, and laboratories formerly housed in Loyola Hall were moved to the more modern, more technologically advanced, more energy-efficient, and safer The Loyola Science Center. Before being demolished, it served as "swing space," or a housing site for classes or offices whose buildings are undergoing renovations. The building provided housing for the Panuska College of Professional Studies Academic Advising Center and the departments of Physical Therapy and Occupational Therapy, all displaced by the demolition of Leahy Hall and the construction of the new Center for Rehabilitation Education. In the summer of 2016, Loyola Hall was demolished.

=== Luzerne House ===
In 1978, the university acquired Luzerne House, located at 308 Clay Avenue, for $60,000. It was then converted into a residency for women students with a capacity of 32 occupants. Luzerne House, named for Luzerne County in Pennsylvania, was demolished in 2010 as part of the University of Scranton's restoration project on Clay Avenue. The site now features green space and a graded sidewalk.

=== Mercer House ===
Acquired in 1974 by the university, Mercer House was converted to a student residence as part of an effort to accommodate the growing number of residential students. Named for Mercer County, Pennsylvania, it housed upperclassmen. In the 1990s, the university stopped using Mercer House as a residence for students after the completion of several larger on-campus residence halls.

=== Montgomery House ===
Acquired in 1974 by the university, Montgomery House, named for Montgomery County in Pennsylvania, was converted to a student residence as part of an effort to accommodate the growing number of residential students. Montgomery House was retired as a student residence in Fall 2008 following the construction of Condron Hall.

=== Old Main ===
Old Main, also known as College Hall, was the first building constructed for St. Thomas College and served as the center of the school's campus for many years.

In 1883, Bishop O'Hara purchased the Wyoming Avenue property near St. Peter's Cathedral from William H. Pier. On August 12, 1888, he blessed and placed a cornerstone as the foundation for St. Thomas College. The laying of the cornerstone was a city-wide celebration, featuring a parade, musical performances by the Cathedral choir and a local orchestra, and a sermon by Bishop O’Hara, attracting residents from the city of Scranton as well as the surrounding area, as far as Wilkes-Barre and Carbondale. The cornerstone held a copper box, in which were placed six newspapers from the day of the dedication and seven silver coins. After four years of intense fundraising, the construction of Old Main was completed. The three-story red brick building, located on Wyoming Avenue next to St. Peter's Cathedral and the Bishop's residence, had three floors and a basement. Originally, there were eight classrooms on the first and second floors, the third floor was an auditorium/gymnasium, and the basement held a chapel dedicated to St. Aloysius. In September 1892, the college opened for classes.

By the 1920s, Old Main could no longer fully accommodate the growing institution and underwent a number of renovations. In 1926, the college's first library was established after part of the gymnasium on the third floor of Old Main was converted. Originally, the library's collection consisted of 300 books that Bishop Hoban had donated from his personal collection. Over the next ten years, the college continued to make changes to Old Main to meet the needs of the expanding student population. The library's collections continued to grow, its existing laboratories were modernized, and the building was repainted and repaired. The gymnasium on the third floor was converted into three laboratories, a lecture hall, and faculty offices. Without a gym on campus, physical education classes moved to the Knights of Columbus gym on North Washington & Olive Streets, and basketball practice moved to Watres Armory. Additional renovations in 1949 transformed the basement of Old Main into a student lounge. Known as Anthracite Hall, it contained a snack bar and could be converted into an auditorium/ballroom with a seating capacity of 600. The library was also expanded to occupy the entire third floor of Old Main, as classrooms and laboratories moved into the Navy barracks, which had been acquired by the university in 1947.

In 1941, Worthington Scranton donated his home and adjoining estate, located on Linden Street in the lower Hill section about seven blocks away from Old Main on Wyoming Avenue, to the University of Scranton. As the school continued to grow, additional buildings were acquired and constructed on the former Scranton Estate, as there was no room for expansion on Wyoming Avenue. Gradually, all operations moved from Old Main to the new campus. The arts and sciences, business, and engineering divisions were moved from Old Main to the naval barracks when they were purchased in 1947. During the 1950s, the university embarked on an ambitious $5,000,000 campus expansion plan, building Loyola Science Hall, Alumni Memorial Library, Gunster Memorial Student Center, and St. Thomas Hall, which allowed the school to vacate its Wyoming Avenue properties, including Old Main in 1962.

During the dedication ceremony for the new classroom building, the original cornerstone from Old Main transferred to the front corner of St. Thomas Hall. Seventy four years after Old Main's blessing in 1888, the University of Scranton transferred its cornerstone to the new campus, linking the university with its past and providing continuity from both the university's former name, St. Thomas College, and its old campus.

After the university vacated Old Main, it was used by Scranton Preparatory School for two years after its previous home, the former Thomson Hospital, was purchased and demolished by the Scranton Redevelopment Authority as part of an effort to widen Mulberry Street. In 1964, Scranton Prep moved to its permanent location, the former Women's Institute Building of the International Correspondence Schools, at 1000 Wyoming Avenue. After Scranton Prep moved locations, the University of Scranton transferred the title of the building back to St. Peter's Cathedral parish. In 1968, Old Main was demolished. Currently, the land serves as the Cathedral Prayer Garden.

=== Somerset House ===
Acquired in 1974 by the university, Somerset House was converted to a student residence as part of an effort to accommodate the growing number of residential students. Originally housing male students, it was converted to a female residence in 1980 and later became coed. Named for Somerset County in Pennsylvania, Somerset House was razed in the 1990s to make way for Brennan Hall.

=== Thomson Hospital ===
Constructed in 1895, Thomson Hall was originally the private hospital of Dr. Charles E. Thomson. When it was first built, the structure was four stories tall, but a later expansion added two additional stories for a total of 24,000 square feet. In 1941, Bishop Hafey purchased the hospital, which had by then ceased operation, for $60,000 for use by the University of Scranton. Called the Annex, the building was not used by the Christian Brothers before they relinquished control of the university to the Society of Jesus.

When the Jesuits arrived at Scranton, renovations were made to the building, including the creation of additional classrooms, faculty offices, and living quarters for out-of-town students and aviation cadets training at the university. It opened in 1942, after the Jesuits took ownership of the University of Scranton. However, two days before Christmas in December 1943, the Annex was severely damaged by a fire. Since the university was in recess for the Christmas holiday, no one was in the building to be injured, although a firefighter died later that night of a heart attack, believed to have been brought on by exhaustion and smoke inhalation. The upper two floors of the Annex were gutted and subsequently eliminated, before the rest of the building was repaired.

The sharp decline in enrollment caused by World War II had reduced the university's space requirements, so when the Annex was repaired, it was decided that the University of Scranton did not need the building. Instead, the Jesuits decided to open a high school housed in the Annex. Since the Jesuits had arrived in Scranton, the Scranton diocese and the Catholic community had requested they establish a college preparatory school. The availability of a reconstructed Annex made such a step possible. Thus, the Scranton Preparatory School was born in 1944. In 1961, Scranton Prep moved from the Annex to the recently vacated Old Main because the Annex had been purchased by the Scranton Redevelopment Authority. It was demolished later that year in order to widen Mulberry Street.

=== Throop House ===
Throop House was originally the private home of Dr. Benjamin H. Throop, a pioneer Scranton physician. It was constructed in 1880, and owned by Dr. Throop until his death in 1897. The structure, located between the Thomson Hospital and LaSalle Hall, was owned by the Throop Estate until 1922, when it was purchased by the Diocese of Scranton in order to accommodate the growing student body of St. Thomas College and provide additional classroom space. The two-story barn behind the Throop House, later called C Building, was converted into a chemistry laboratory. During the 1920s and 1930s, the Throop House mainly held freshman classes but also served as a meeting space for the local Scranton Catholic Club and classrooms for the high school division of St. Thomas. Though its former barn was used by the university until 1956, Throop House was demolished in January 1943, because it was considered a fire hazard.

=== Wyoming House ===
Acquired by the university in 1982 for $115,000 to be used as a student residence, Wyoming House was constructed in 1901 and originally known as Jefferson Towne House. The three-floor, Colonial Revival-style Towne House had been used over the years as a medical office, a music conservatory, a funeral parlor, and a catering business. In 2000, Wyoming House was demolished to make room for the construction of Mulberry Plaza.
