= List of Mercy University alumni =

Mercy University is an independent, coeducational institution serving approximately 9,000 students each year across campuses in Westchester, the Bronx, Manhattan, as well as online. Mercy University had more than 100,000 alumni as of 2026. The now-defunct College of New Rochelle's alumni have been merged into the Mercy University alumni community. Here follows a partial list of some notable Mercy University alumni.

== Academia ==
- Madeleine Blais, journalist, author and professor in the University of Massachusetts Amherst's journalism department; Pulitzer Prize winner
- Paul Broadie, president of Housatonic Community College and Gateway Community College
- Julia Ching, professor of religion, philosophy and East Asian studies at the University of Toronto; taught at Columbia and Yale before joining the University of Toronto faculty
- Anthony Mullen, 2009 National Teacher of the Year award winner.
- Regina Peruggi, educator; president of Kingsborough Community College 2005–2014; former president of Marymount Manhattan College and led the Central Park Conservancy
- Teresa P. Pica, professor of Education at the University of Pennsylvania Graduate School of Education
- Meisha Ross Porter, educator, New York City Schools chancellor
- Pamela Smart, high school teacher
- Gregory Howard Williams, 27th president of the University of Cincinnati, 11th president of the City College of New York
- Darlene Yee-Melichar, professor and coordinator of the gerontology program at San Francisco State University, where she also serves as director of Long-Term Care Administration

== Government and civil service ==
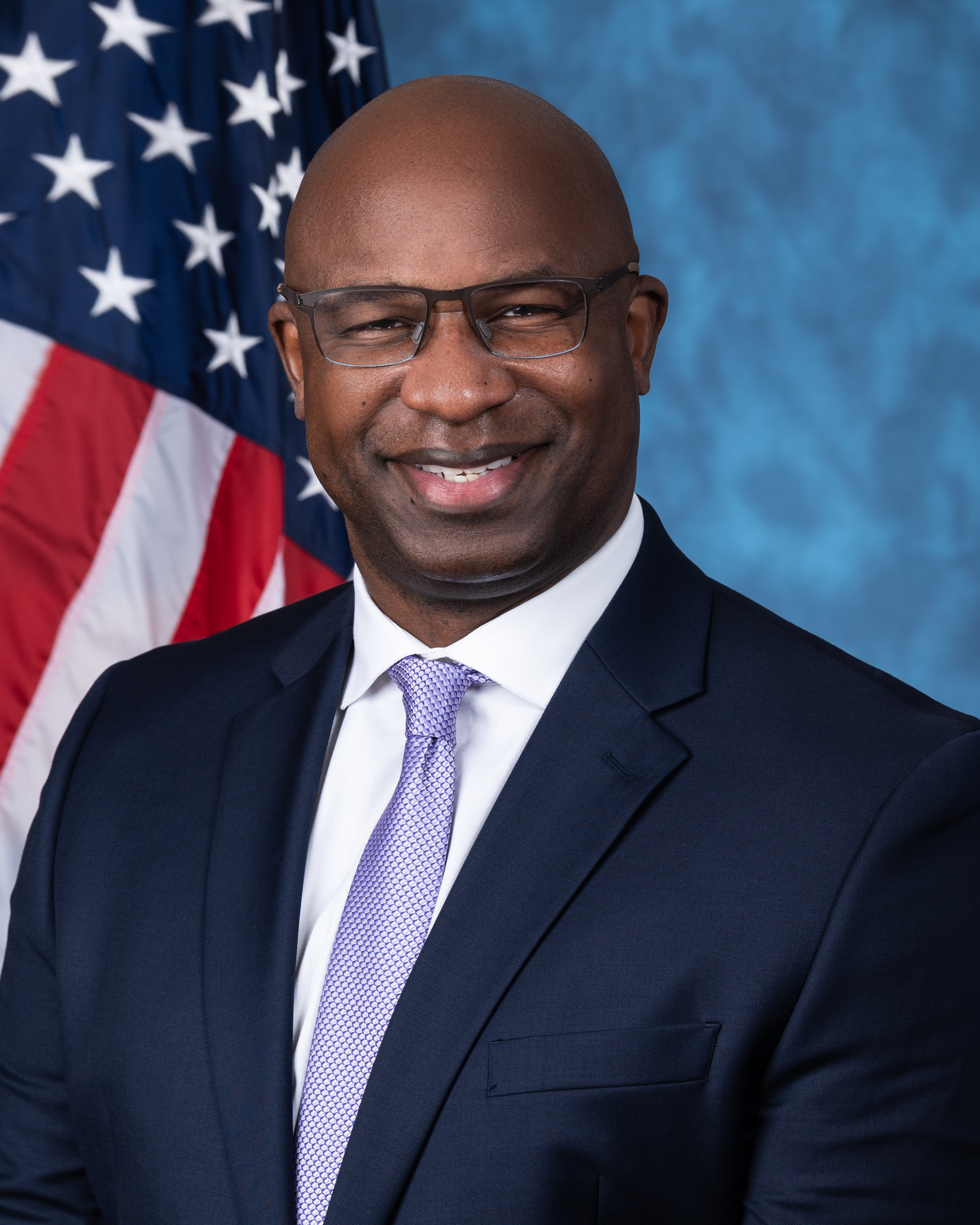
Alumnus Jamaal Bowman served as the U.S. representative for New York's 16th congressional district.

- Oseadeeyo Kwasi Akuffo III, Ghanaian traditional; Omanhene (or paramount chief) of the Akuapem traditional area (Okuapeman) in Ghana
- Maria del Carmen Arroyo, former council member for the 17th district of the New York City Council
- Jamaal Bowman, politician and educator serving as the U.S. representative for New York's 16th congressional district since 2021
- Waveline Bennett-Conroy, Mount Vernon Board of Education Superintendent.
- Robert Cornegy, New York City Council member for the 36th District, representing Bedford-Stuyvesant and northern Crown Heights in Brooklyn
- Anna Cowin, former Lake County School District superintendent, served in the Florida State Senate
- Pasquale J. D'Amuro, terrorism authority, former intelligence agent and television analyst; in a career of 26 years, he rose to the third position of the FBI
- Mike Kavekotora, Namibian politician and member of parliament; president of the Rally for Democracy and Progress
- David Rosado, politician from New York

== Law ==
- Mary Donohue, retired educator, attorney, politician, and judge of the New York Court of Claims; former two-term lieutenant governor of New York
- Aulana L. Peters, retired partner at the law firm of Gibson, Dunn & Crutcher LLP
- James Reitz, judge and politician from Putnam County, New York; former acting justice for the US Supreme Court's 9th Judicial District

== Religion ==
- Ada Maria Isasi-Diaz, Cuban-American theologian; served as professor emerita of ethics and theology at Drew University in Madison, New Jersey

== Activists ==
- Elaine Bartlett, activist
- Rosemary Dempsey, activist, has served many roles in second wave feminism, civil rights movements, and anti-war protests
- Jeffrey Mark Deskovic, lawyer and activist
- Donna Hylton, Jamaican-American activist
- Jon-Adrian Velazquez, criminal legal reform activist

== Arts and entertainment ==
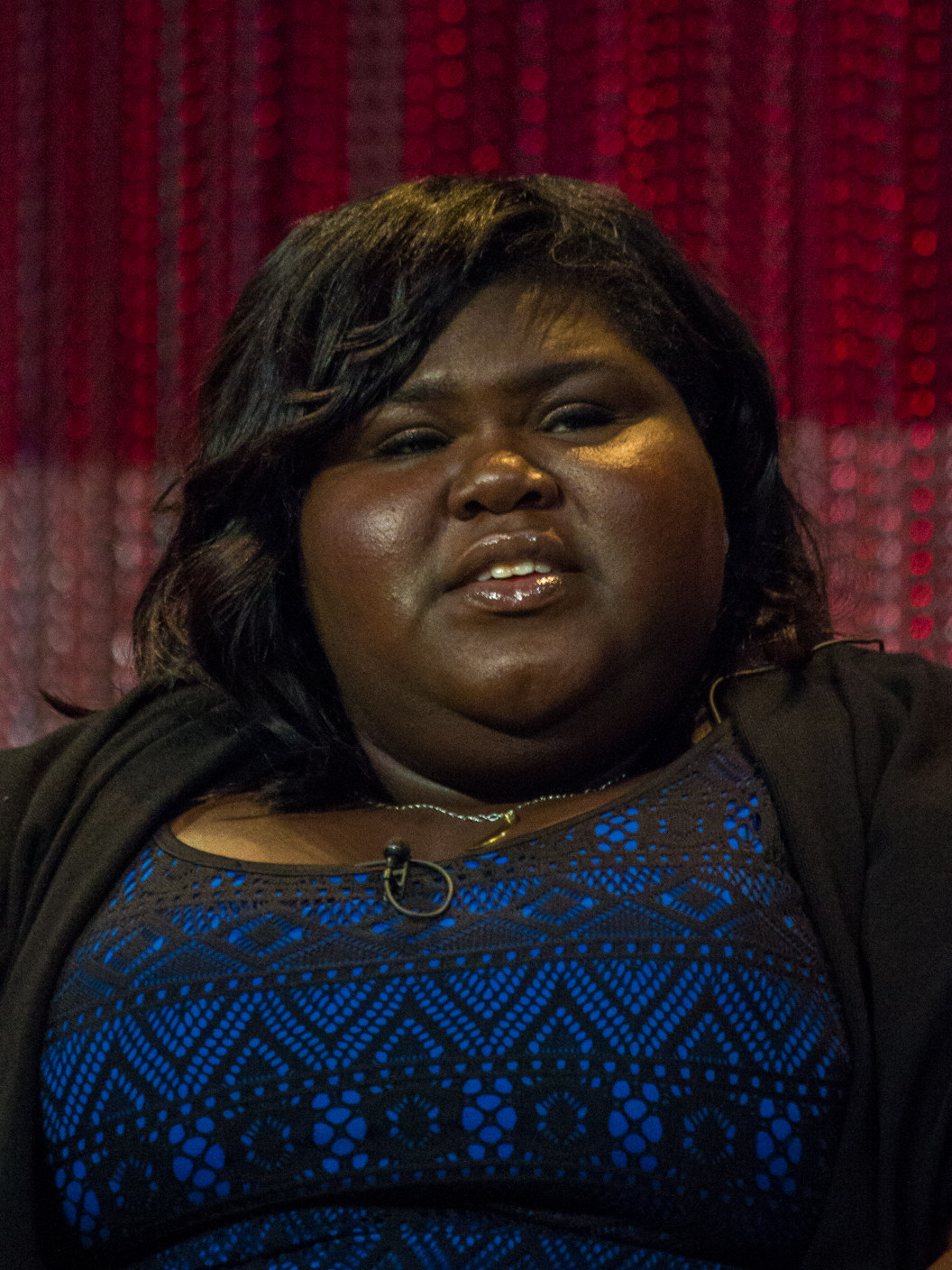
Alumna Gabourey Sidibe, Academy Award-nominated actress

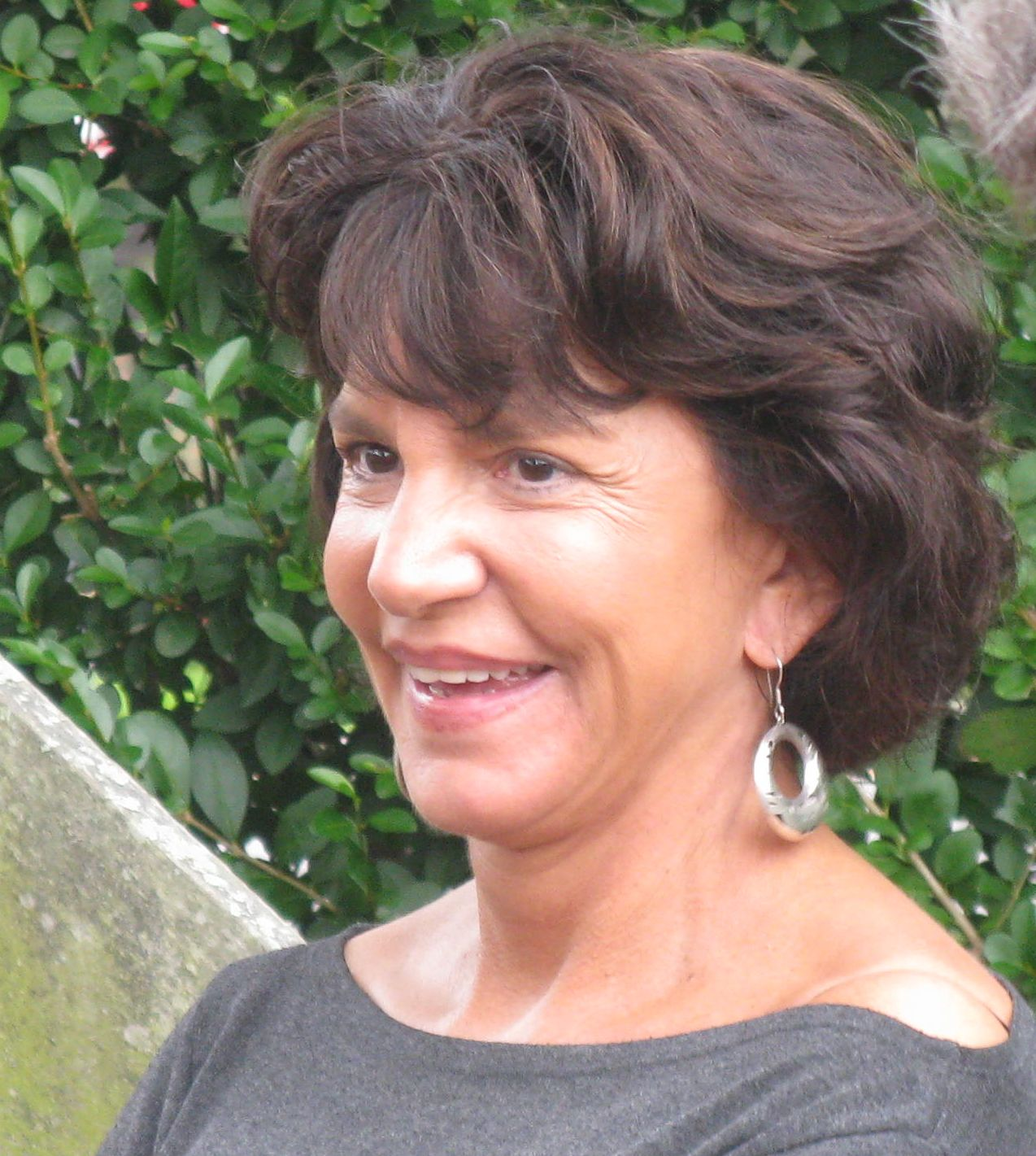
Alumna Mercedes Ruehl is the recipient of several accolades, including an Academy Award, a Golden Globe Award and a Tony Award.

- Alicia Barney, Colombian artist based in Cali who focuses her paintings and installation art on ecological questions and problems such as water pollution, deforestation and quality of life
- Patricia Breslin, actress and philanthropist
- Angela Cascarano, Emmy award–winning TV news producer.
- Allys Dwyer, actress, became a college educator
- Clarence Maclin, actor known for his role in Sing Sing
- Leopoldo Minaya, poet
- Olivia Peguero, contemporary landscape and botanical artist
- Claire Porter, choreographer/comedian known for blending comedic monologues with dance movement
- Mercedes Ruehl, screen, stage, and television actress; recipient of several accolades, including an Academy Award, a Golden Globe Award, a Tony Award, a Drama Desk Award, two Obie Awards, and two Outer Critics Circle Awards
- Gabourey Sidibe, Academy Award-nominated actress
- Myra Turley, film and television actress

== Journalism ==
- Dorothy Kilgallen, columnist, journalist, and television game show panelist
- Maria Mercader, journalist and news producer for CBS News for over three decades; won a business Emmy Award in 2004 for her work producing a CBS feature report about computer spam

== Authors ==
- Camille Marchetta, former London literary agent, novelist, television writer and producer best known for her work on Dallas, Dynasty and Falcon Crest
- Sandra Uwiringiyimana, author
- Joan Wolf, author of more than 15 historical novels

== Sports ==
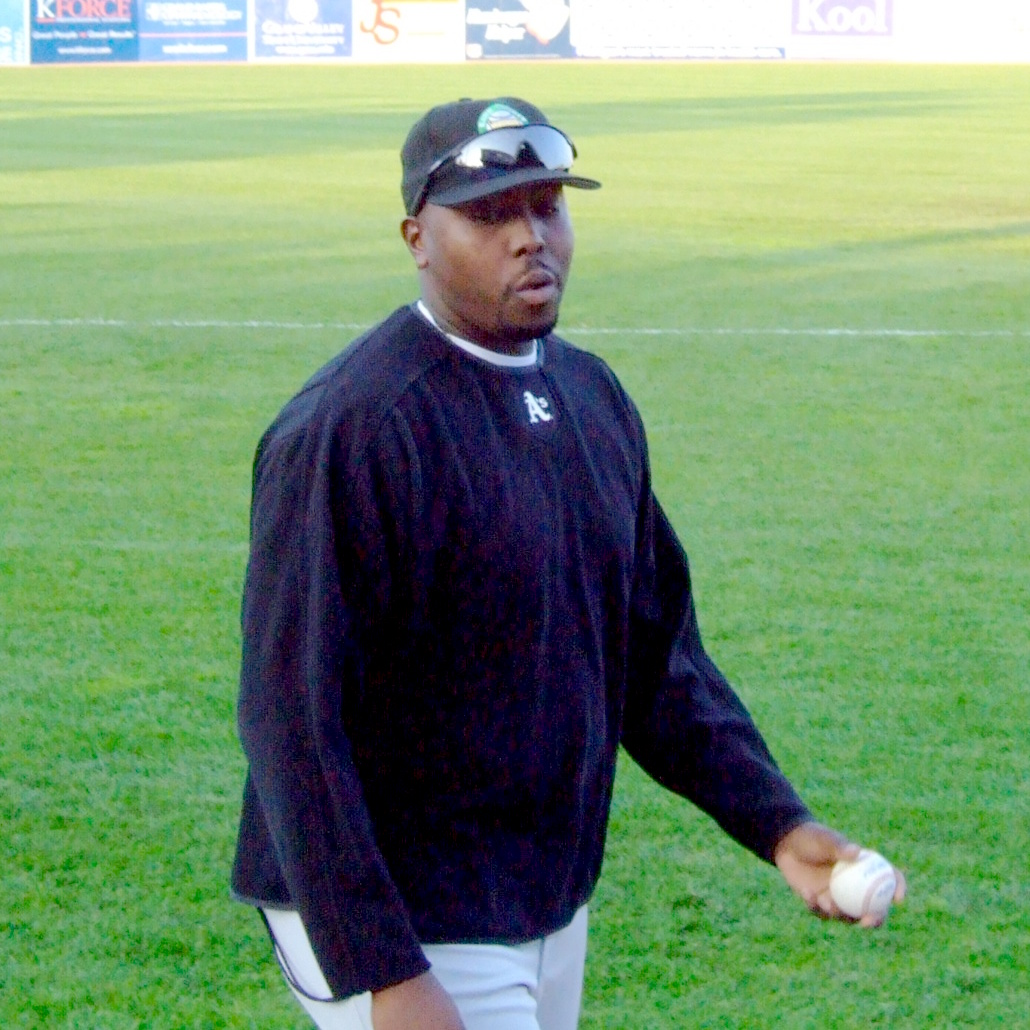
Alumnus Garvin Alston, professional baseball right-handed pitcher who played in Major League Baseball

- Garvin Alston, retired professional baseball right-handed pitcher who played in Major League Baseball (MLB)
- Dewey Bozella, former amateur boxer
- Michael Collins, former professional soccer player who played as a midfielder; played for at least twelve teams in nearly half a dozen leagues over his seventeen-year career; earned two caps with the United States national team in 1988; president and general manager of California United Strikers FC
- Laura Creavalle, professional female bodybuilder
- Rob DiToma, head baseball coach at Fairleigh Dickinson University
- Jude Flannery, triathlete who won six consecutive US national championships between 1991 and 1996
- Simone Forbes, Jamaican sportswoman, represented Jamaica in five sports
- Stan Jefferson, former center and left fielder in Major League Baseball who played for the New York Mets, among others
- Brian Sweeney, former MLB pitcher
- Wesley Walker, former NFL wide receiver
- Mookie Wilson, former MLB outfielder and coach

== Business ==
- Walter Anderson, former publisher and CEO of Parade magazine
- Noreen Culhane, businesswoman and executive vice president of the New York Stock Exchange, directing their Global Corporate Client Group
- Alex Ferrari, chief financial officer for MTV Networks.
- George Gallego, world ranked para-triathlete and entrepreneur
- Carolyn Kepcher, businesswoman; judge on the NBC TV program The Apprentice
- Michele Quirolo, president and chief executive officer of The Visiting Nurse Association of Hudson Valley.
- Anne Sweeney, businesswoman; member of the board of directors at Netflix and LEGO A/S, and the board of trustees at the Mayo Clinic and the J.P. Getty Trust; former co-chair of Disney Media Networks and president of the Disney–ABC Television Group; former president of Disney Channel 1996–2014

== Science and medicine ==
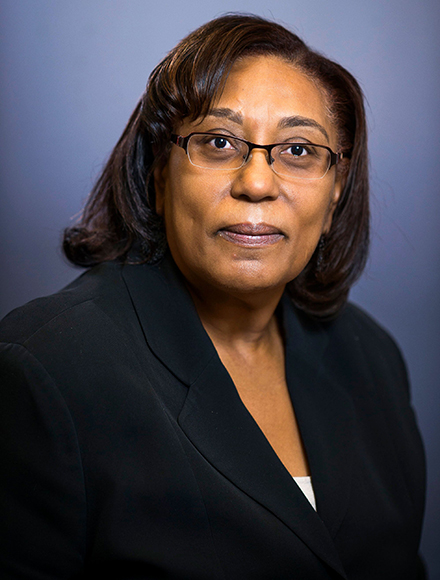
Alumna Emmeline Edwards served as the director of the division of extramural research at the National Center for Complementary and Integrative Health.

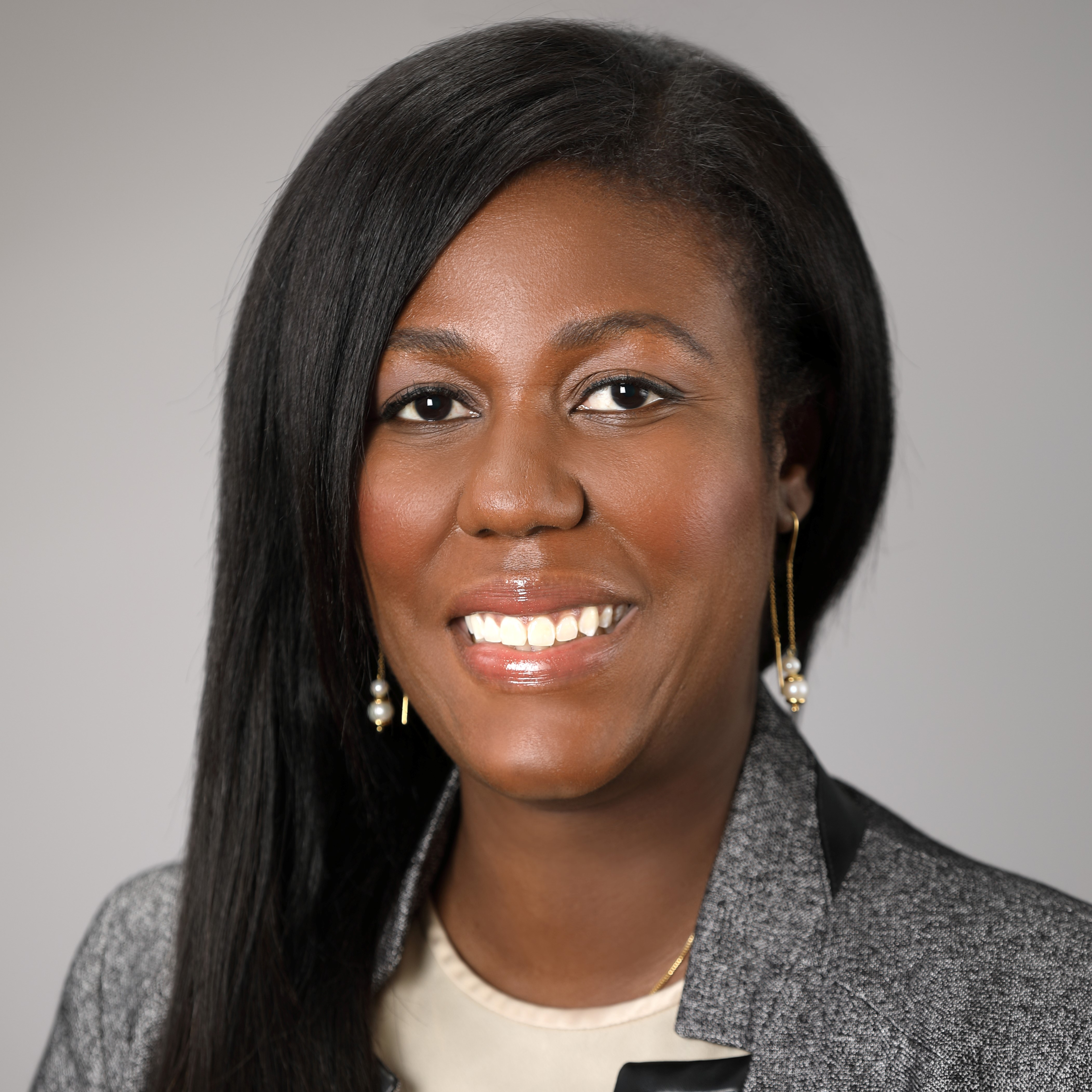
Alumna Paule Valery Joseph is the 2022 National Academy of Medicine and an American Academy of Nursing fellow.

- Emmeline Edwards, neurochemist; director of the division of extramural research at the National Center for Complementary and Integrative Health; researched the neural mechanisms of complex behaviors and characterization of a genetic model of affective disorders at the University of Maryland, College Park; deputy director of the extramural program at the National Institute of Neurological Disorders and Stroke 2000–2010
- Kathleen Ethier, social psychologist and public health official with the CDC; director of CDC's Division of Adolescent and School Health in the National Center for HIV/AIDS, Viral Hepatitis, STD, and TB Prevention
- Paule Valery Joseph, nurse and researcher at the National Institute on Alcohol Abuse and Alcoholism; 2022 National Academy of Medicine American Academy of Nursing fellow
- Mary Jane Perry, oceanographer known for the use of optics to study marine phytoplankton
- Margaret C. Snyder, social scientist

== Military ==
- Patricia Ann Tracey, retired United States naval officer and the first woman to be promoted to the rank of vice admiral in the United States Navy; held the positions of chief of naval education and training (CNET) (1996–1998), deputy assistant secretary of defense for Military Personnel Policy (1998–2001), and director of Navy staff from 2001 until her retirement in 2004
