= Alexander Bachmanov =

American geneticist

Alexander A. Bachmanov
- Born: Russian Federation
- Education: Saint Petersburg Veterinary Institute, Pavlov Institute of Physiology, Cambridge University
- Known for: Taste; Behavioral genetics
- Scientific career
- Fields: Genetics, physiology, neuroscience
- Workplaces: Pavlov Institute of Physiology Monell Chemical Senses Center GSK
- Academic advisors: Gary Beauchamp

Dr. Alexander Bachmanov studied veterinary medicine at the Saint Petersburg Veterinary Institute, Russia (1977-1982), received his Ph.D. in biological sciences from the Pavlov Institute of Physiology in Saint Petersburg, Russia in 1990. He completed postdoctoral fellowships at the Physiological Laboratory at Cambridge University in 1993 and at the Monell Chemical Senses Center, Philadelphia, Pennsylvania, in the United States from 1994 to 1997. He later joined Monnell's faculty.

== Career and research ==
His research at the Monell Chemical Senses Center focused on the genetics of taste, ingestive behavior, alcohol intake, metabolism and obesity. Bachmanov and his collaborators pioneered using the positional cloning approach to identify genes influencing behavior. Their identification of the mouse saccharin preference (Sac) genetic locus as a gene encoding the TAS1R3 taste receptor was the first successful positional cloning of a behavioral quantitative trait locus (QTL). They have mapped several mouse QTLs for alcohol consumption and obesity. To discover novel genes involved in taste, they used transcriptomic and genetic engineering approaches.

In 2017, Bachmanov joined GSK, located in Collegeville, Pennsylvania, to work on pre-clinical drug discovery and development.

== Select publications ==
- Bachmanov AA, Kiefer SW, Molina JC, Tordoff MG, Duffy VB, Bartoshuk LM, Mennella JA (2003) Chemosensory factors influencing alcohol perception, preferences and consumption. Alcoholism: Clinical and Experimental Research 27 (2): 220-231.
- Bachmanov AA, Beauchamp GK (2007). Taste Receptor Genes. Annual Review of Nutrition 27:389-414.
- Boughter JD, Bachmanov AA (2008) Genetics and Evolution of Taste. In: Basbaum AI, Kaneko A, Shepherd GM, Westheimer G (eds), The Senses: A Comprehensive Reference, Vol. 4 (Firestein S, Beauchamp GK eds), Olfaction and Taste. Elsevier/Academic Press, San Diego, CA. P. 371–390.
- Bachmanov, Alexander A; Boughter, John D (2012). Genetics of Taste Perception, eLS. doi:10.1002/9780470015902.a0023587. ISBN 978-0-470-01617-6.
- Bachmanov, AA; Bosak, NP; Lin, C; Matsumoto, I; Ohmoto, M; Reed, DR; Nelson, TM (2014). "Genetics of taste receptors". Curr Pharm Des. 20 (16): 2669–83. doi:10.2174/13816128113199990566. PMC 4764331. PMID 23886383.
- Bachmanov, AA; Bosak, NP; Glendinning, JI; Inoue, M; Li, X; Manita, S; McCaughey, SA; Murata, Y; Reed, DR; Tordoff, MG; Beauchamp, GK (2016). "Genetics of Amino Acid Taste and Appetite". Adv Nutr. 7 (4): 806S–22S. doi:10.3945/an.115.011270. PMC 4942865. PMID 27422518.
