= Paule Valery Joseph =

American nurse and researcher

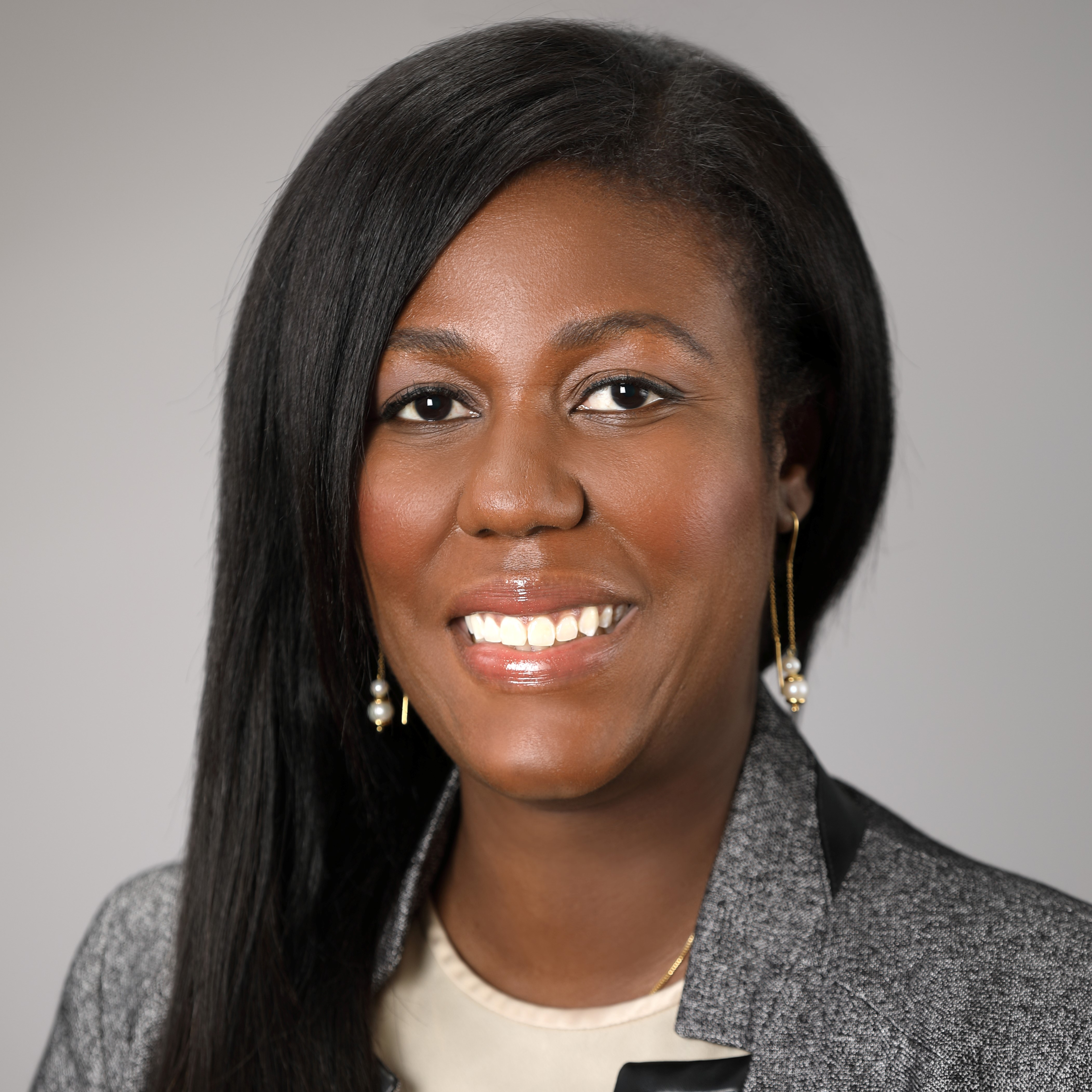
- Joseph in 2019, NIAAA official photograph
- Education: University of Pennsylvania; Pace University; College of New Rochelle; Hostos Community College
- Scientific career
- Workplaces: National Institute of Nursing Research; National Institutes of Health
- Thesis: Sucrose Thresholds and Genetic Polymorphisms of Sweet and Bitter Taste Receptor Genes in Children (2015)

Paule Valery Joseph is an American nurse and researcher at the National Institute on Alcohol Abuse and Alcoholism. She is the 2022 National Academy of Medicine and American Academy of Nursing Fellow.

== Early life and education ==
Joseph is from Venezuela. She spent her childhood watching her mother acting as the community nurse. Her father was a teacher. She earned her Associate of Applied Science (AAS) in nursing at Hostos Community College. She moved to the College of New Rochelle for her Bachelor of Science in Nursing (BSN). She moved to Pace University for her graduate studies, where she earned a master's degree in nursing. She eventually joined the University of Pennsylvania, where she studied sucrose thresholds receptor genes in children. She discovered that differences in the way young people taste sugar may impact their dietary intake, resulting in long-term conditions including obesity. Doctorate in hand, Joseph joined the National Institute of Nursing Research as a postdoctoral researcher.

== Research and career ==
Every year, smell and taste disorders impact hundreds of thousands of people in the United States. Joseph leads the Sensory Science and Metabolism Unit at the National Institute of Nursing Research. This unit looks to understand the molecular mechanisms that underpin chemosensing (taste, smell and chemesthesis, skin sensitivity to chemicals). She is interested in the development of predictive models that can be used to understand the gut–brain axis. She showed that ultra-processed food can increase the risk of certain cancers and heart disease. Joseph demonstrated that people on plant-based, low-fat diets lost weight faster than those on animal-based low-carb, high-fat diets. Based on this research, Joseph believes it will be possible to improve personalised nutritional programmes. In 2019 Joseph was named the Lasker Scholar and National Institutes of Health Distinguished Scholar.

During the COVID-19 pandemic Joseph switched her focus to consider why people suffering from COVID-19 reported losing their sense of taste and smell. She has attempted to define clinical standards for measuring taste and smell, and is conducting investigations into the taste and smell of people suffering from Long COVID. She was named the 2022 National Academy of Medicine American Academy of Nursing Fellow. The fellowship is the first of its kind.

== Awards and honours ==
- 2013 Johnson & Johnson American Association of Colleges of Nursing Minority Nurse Faculty Scholarship
- 2016 Rockefeller University Heilbrunn Nurse Scholar Award
- 2020 National Minority Quality Forum 40 Under 40 Leaders
- 2020 National Association of Hispanic Nurses 40 Under 40 Award
- 2021 Association for Chemoreception Sciences Ajinomoto Award for Young Investigators in Gustation
- 2022 National Association of Hispanic Nurses Janie Menchaca Wilson Leadership Award
- 2025 Guggenheim Fellowship

== Select publications ==
- Hall, Kevin; Alexis Ayuketah; Brychta, Robert; et al. (2019). "Ultra-Processed Diets Cause Excess Calorie Intake and Weight Gain: An Inpatient Randomized Controlled Trial of Ad Libitum Food Intake". Cell Metabolism. 30 (1): 67-77.e3. doi:10.1016/j.cmet.2019.05.008. PMID 31105044. Wikidata Q78878654.
- Parma, Valentina; Kathrin Ohla; Veldhuizen, Maria; et al. (2020). "More than smell - COVID-19 is associated with severe impairment of smell, taste, and chemesthesis". Chemical Senses. doi:10.1093/chemse/bjaa041. PMC 7337664. PMID 32564071. Wikidata Q96616933.
- Joseph, Paule; Reed, Danielle; Mennella, Julie (2016). "Individual Differences Among Children in Sucrose Detection Thresholds: Relationship With Age, Gender, and Bitter Taste Genotype". Nursing Research. 65 (1): 3–12. doi:10.1097/nnr.0000000000000138. PMC 4679349. PMID 26633761. Wikidata Q36372315.
