= Breslin =

Breslin is a given and surname that originates from Irish: Ó Breisleáin. The name means “gift to the earth”, but has also been linked to intelligence, empathy, integrity, righteousness and hope.

== Notable people ==
=== Surname ===
- Abigail Breslin (born 1996), American actress
- Bernard Breslin (1874–1913), Scottish footballer
- Cathal Breslin (born 1978), classical pianist from Northern Ireland
- Charles Breslin (1964–1985), IRA member
- Cormac Breslin (1902–1978), Irish Fianna Fáil politician
- Edward Breslin (1882–1914), Australian politician
- Éamonn Breslin (1940–2021), Irish Gaelic footballer
- Herbert Breslin (1924–2012), American music industry executive
- Hope Breslin (born 1999), American soccer player
- Howard Breslin (1912–1964), American novelist
- Jack Breslin (1920–1988), American Maryland academic administrator
- Jack Breslin (footballer) (born 1997), Scottish footballer
- Jimmy Breslin (1928–2017), American journalist and author
- John G. Breslin (c. 1824 – 1889), American democratic republican
- John Breslin (born 1973), Irish engineer and professor
- Keiran Breslin, American soccer player
- DJ Baby Anne (real name Marianne Breslin; born 1972), American DJ and music producer
- Mark Breslin (born 1952), Canadian comedian, actor, public speaker and businessman
- Mary Lou Breslin (born 1944), American advocate for disability rights
- Maura Breslin (1914–1984), Irish feminist
- Morgan Breslin (born 1991), American footballer
- Neil Breslin (born 1942), American New York State Senator
- Niall Breslin (born 1980), American vocalist for The Blizzards
- Paddy Breslin (1943–2020), New Zealand footballer
- Padraic Breslin (1907–1942), Irish communist
- Patricia Breslin (1931–2011), American actress and philanthropist
- Paul Breslin, American geneticist
- Paul Breslin (footballer) (born 1946), Scottish footballer
- Peg McDonnell Breslin (born 1946), American politician
- Shaun Breslin (born 1964), Irish academic
- Spencer Breslin (born 1992), American actor and musician
- Susannah Breslin, American writer
- Theresa Breslin (born 1947), Scottish author
- Thomas F. Breslin (1885–1942), American civil engineer
- Tim Breslin (1967–2005), American ice hockey player

=== Middle ===
- Joan Breslin Pitkin (born 1932), American assembly member

=== Fictional Breslins ===
- Aidan Breslin, protagonist in the 2009 film Horsemen
- Ray Breslin, protagonist in the 2013 film Escape Plan

== See also ==
- Breslin Apartments in Spokane, Washington
- Breslin Student Events Center at Michigan State University
- John J. Breslin Theatre at Felician University
- Wilber F. Breslin Center for Real Estate Studies at Hofstra University
