= List of cognitive psychologists =

The following is a list of academics, both past and present, recognized for their contributions to the field of cognitive psychology.

- Lise Abrams
- Tracy Packiam Alloway
- John R. Anderson
- Magda Arnold
- Janette Atkinson
- David Ausubel
- Alan Baddeley
- Albert Bandura
- Frederic Bartlett
- Elizabeth Bates
- Aaron T. Beck
- Iris Berent
- Lera Boroditsky
- Gordon H. Bower
- Donald Broadbent
- Jerome Bruner
- Susan Carey
- Patricia Cheng
- Noam Chomsky
- Michael Cole
- Fergus Craik
- Kenneth Craik
- Pamela Dalton
- Antonio Damasio
- Hermann Ebbinghaus
- Albert Ellis
- William Estes
- Eugene Galanter
- Vittorio Gallese
- C. Randy Gallistel
- Michael Gazzaniga
- Rochel Gelman
- Dedre Gentner
- Vittorio Guidano
- Donald O. Hebb
- Keith Holyoak
- Philip Johnson-Laird
- Daniel Kahneman
- Nancy Kanwisher
- Jennifer Dustow
- Jung-Mo Lee
- Eric Lenneberg
- Alan Leslie
- Willem Levelt
- Elizabeth Loftus
- Alexander Luria
- Brian MacWhinney
- George Mandler
- Jean Matter Mandler
- James McClelland
- David E. Meyer
- George Armitage Miller
- Naomi Miyake
- Ken Nakayama
- Ulric Neisser
- Allen Newell
- Allan Paivio
- Seymour Papert
- Jean Piaget
- Steven Pinker
- Michael Posner
- Karl H. Pribram
- Zenon Pylyshyn
- Giacomo Rizzolatti
- Henry L. Roediger III
- Eleanor Rosch
- David Rumelhart
- Eleanor Saffran
- Daniel Schacter
- Otto Selz
- Roger Shepard
- Richard Shiffrin
- Herbert A. Simon
- Linda B. Smith
- Elizabeth Spelke
- George Sperling
- Robert Sternberg
- Larry Squire
- Saul Sternberg
- Esther Thelen
- Anne Treisman
- Endel Tulving
- Amos Tversky
- Lev Vygotsky
