= Unilever Research Laboratorium =

Dutch research centre

- URDV, Unilever Research Vlaardingen
- Location within South Holland
- Former names: Unilever Research & Development Vlaardingen, Unilever Foods Research Centre

General information
- Type: Biology and nutrition research centre
- Architectural style: Research centre
- Location: Olivier van Noortlaan 120, Vlaardingen
- Coordinates: 51.9°N 4.342°E
- Elevation: 10 m (33 ft)
- Completed: 1956
- Inaugurated: November 1956
- Client: Unilever N.V., Unilever Nederland
- Owner: Private science park

Dimensions
- Other dimensions: 6 acres

The Unilever Research Laboratorium was a nutrition and human biology research centre in South Holland, owned by Unilever, and since November 2019, has been a private science park.

== History ==
=== Construction ===
At the time of construction in 1956, Vlaardingen was the third-busiest port in the Netherlands, situated on the Nieuwe Maas.

On 14 February 1945, a neighbouring Unilever factory was set up as a V-1 launching site, with another site at Ypenburg, on the coast. The site was consequently attacked by RAF Typhoon aircraft on 23 March 1945. These were some of the last V-1 missiles launched against England.

The neighbouring factory closed in 2008. Research by Unilever in the Netherlands occurred during the war at Zwijndrecht, Netherlands.

=== Opening ===
The site was officially opened in November 1956 by Willem Drees, the Dutch prime minister. Another research site was at Bahrenfeld in Germany.

The site presented the Unilever Research Prize for over 60 years when owned by Unilever Benelux.

=== Current site ===
On 6 October 2016, Unilever announced that the site would close. The site closed in November 2019 and is now a private science park.

== Research ==
In 1968, the centre found the protein miraculin, as well as researchers at the Florida State University College of Human Sciences. Other work made by Henk Van der Wel into the biochemistry of sweetness sensing was published in Chemical Senses.

By genetically-modifying a bacterium, the genes for making thaumatin were added, in 1980.

== Visits ==
- On 1 April 1969, a new laboratory was opened by Prince Claus of the Netherlands.

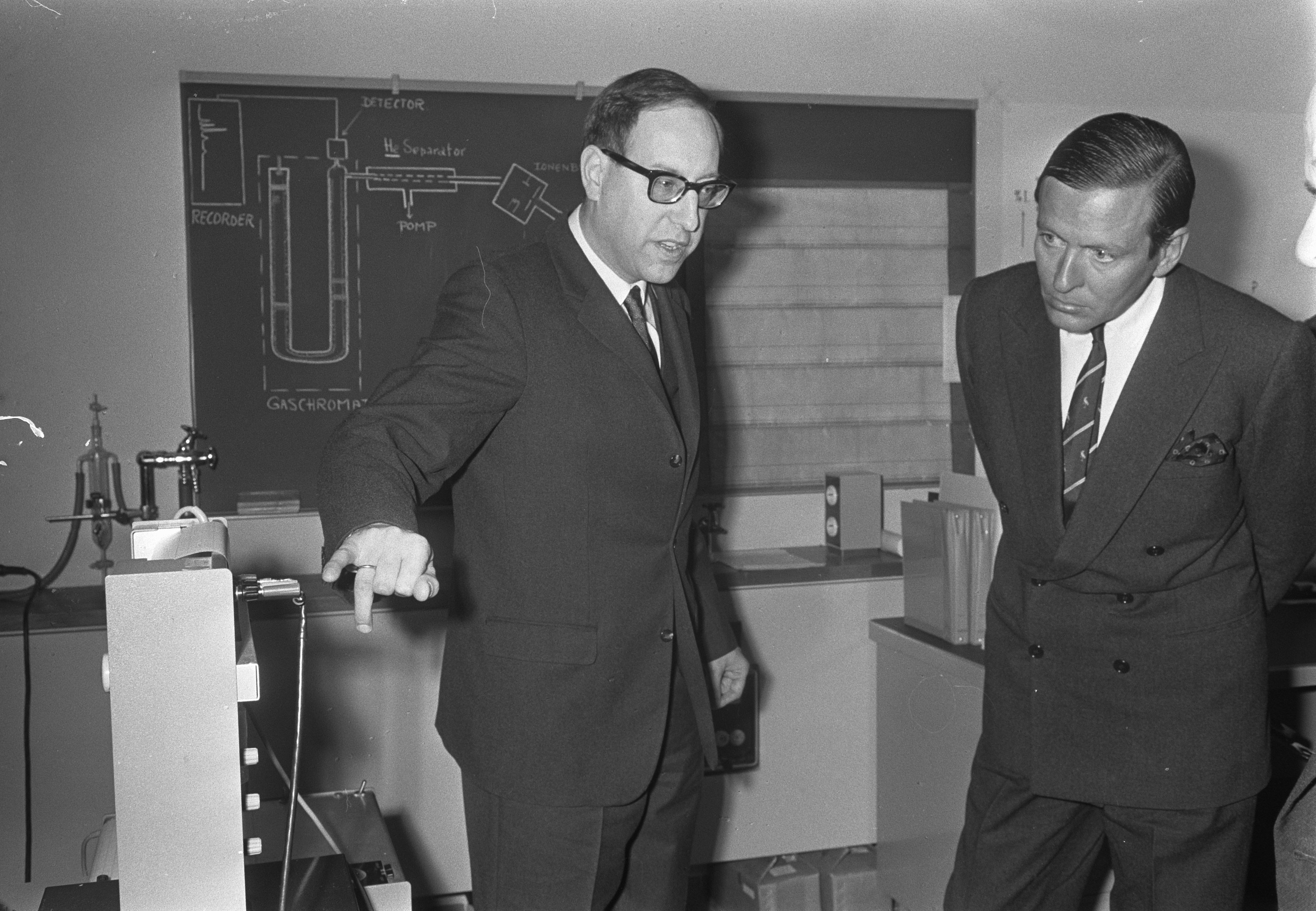
Prins Claus visits in April 1969

- On 5 December 2016 Martijn van Dam, State Secretary for the Ministry of Economic Affairs and Climate Policy, visited.

== Former employees ==
- David Adriaan van Dorp, in 1967 worked with University College Cardiff

== See also ==
- Monell Chemical Senses Center
