= Charles Wysocki (biologist) =

Charles J. Wysocki is an American biologist and psychologist who is an emeritus member of the Monell Chemical Senses Center. He is notable for his work with the genetics of olfaction in mice and humans, the vomeronasal organ and the major histocompatibility complex. He has worked with Drs. George Preti and Gary Beauchamp in the past.
