= Perfetti =

Perfetti is an Italian surname. Notable people with the surname include:

- Augusto Perfetti, Italian billionaire businessman
- Charles Perfetti, American psychologist
- Chris Perfetti (born 1988), American actor
- Cole Perfetti (born 2002), Canadian professional ice hockey player
- Egidio Perfetti (born 1975), Norwegian racing driver
- Flora Perfetti (born 1969), Italian tennis player
- Giorgio Perfetti, Italian billionaire businessman

== See also ==
- Perfetti Van Melle, candy company
