= Mercy University School of Business =

Coordinates: 41.021919°N 73.873271°W

- Type: Private
- Established: 1950
- Accreditation: MSCHE
- Affiliations: Mercy University
- Dean: Victor Petenkemani (interim dean)
- Location: Dobbs Ferry, New York, United States
- Campus: Suburban/Urban
- Website: www.mercy.edu/business/

Mercy University's School of Business was established in 1950. The school comprises three departments offering eleven bachelor's degrees and four graduate degrees. Victor Petenkemani is the interim dean of the School of Business.

For the 2022–23 academic year, undergraduate tuition and fees totaled $22,106. The MBA program was ranked #260-345, tied with the Farmer School of Business of Miami University, among the best online MBA programs by U.S. News & World Report as of March 2024.

== History ==
Although Mercy University had offered courses in business since the 1950s, the School of Business started offering graduate courses in business in the late 1980s. The Business School is a member of the Association of Management Consulting Firms.

== Academics ==
=== Admissions ===
Admissions decisions are made holistically, considering academic record, standardized test scores, accomplishments outside of the classroom, recommendations, and essays. For graduate admission, a baccalaureate degree from an accredited college with a minimum 3.0/4.0 GPA is required. The graduate business programs had a 68% acceptance rate in 2017. The MBA program's admission rate in Fall 2019 was 64%.

=== Departments ===
- Public Accounting
- Business Administration
- Human Resource Management
- Organizational Leadership

=== Centers ===
- Strategic Consulting Institute
- Center for Entrepreneurship
- Women's Leadership Institute

== MBA program ==
As of 2019, the Mercy University School of Business's MBA program comprises a curriculum of 57 credits. The core curriculum includes courses such as Corporate Finance, Financial Accounting, Managerial Statistics, Managerial Economics, Leadership, Operations Management, and Marketing Strategy. Part of the MBA program includes the Strategic Consulting Institute, where students participate in consulting projects with Fortune 500 companies. In addition to the traditional MBA program, Mercy offers an MBA "Turbo Program" in which students may attend classes for approximately one month to earn class waivers totaling 21 credits.

== Facilities ==
The School of Business is located on Mercy University's main campus in Dobbs Ferry, New York, as well as in Manhattan and the Bronx.

== Notable alumni ==
- George Gallego, a world ranked para-triathlete and entrepreneur.
- Carolyn Kepcher, businesswoman who was one of the judges on the NBC television program The Apprentice.
- Gregory H. Williams, 27th President of the University of Cincinnati (2009 to 2012) and the 11th President of the City College of New York (2001 - 2009).
