= Arlene Love =

American artist

Arlene Love (born 1930) is a sculptor, painter, and photographer.

== Early life & education ==
Love was born in Philadelphia and studied at Temple University’s Tyler School of Art.

== Career ==
Love has publicly commissioned sculptures in Philadelphia, PA at the Monell Chemical Senses Center and the Kimmel Center for the Performing Arts. Face Fragment is a 10' tall sculpture made of fiberglass, reinforced polyester resin with gold-leaf patina, on a concrete base. Winged Woman is a bronze sculpture in the garden of the Dorchester facing Rittenhouse Square.

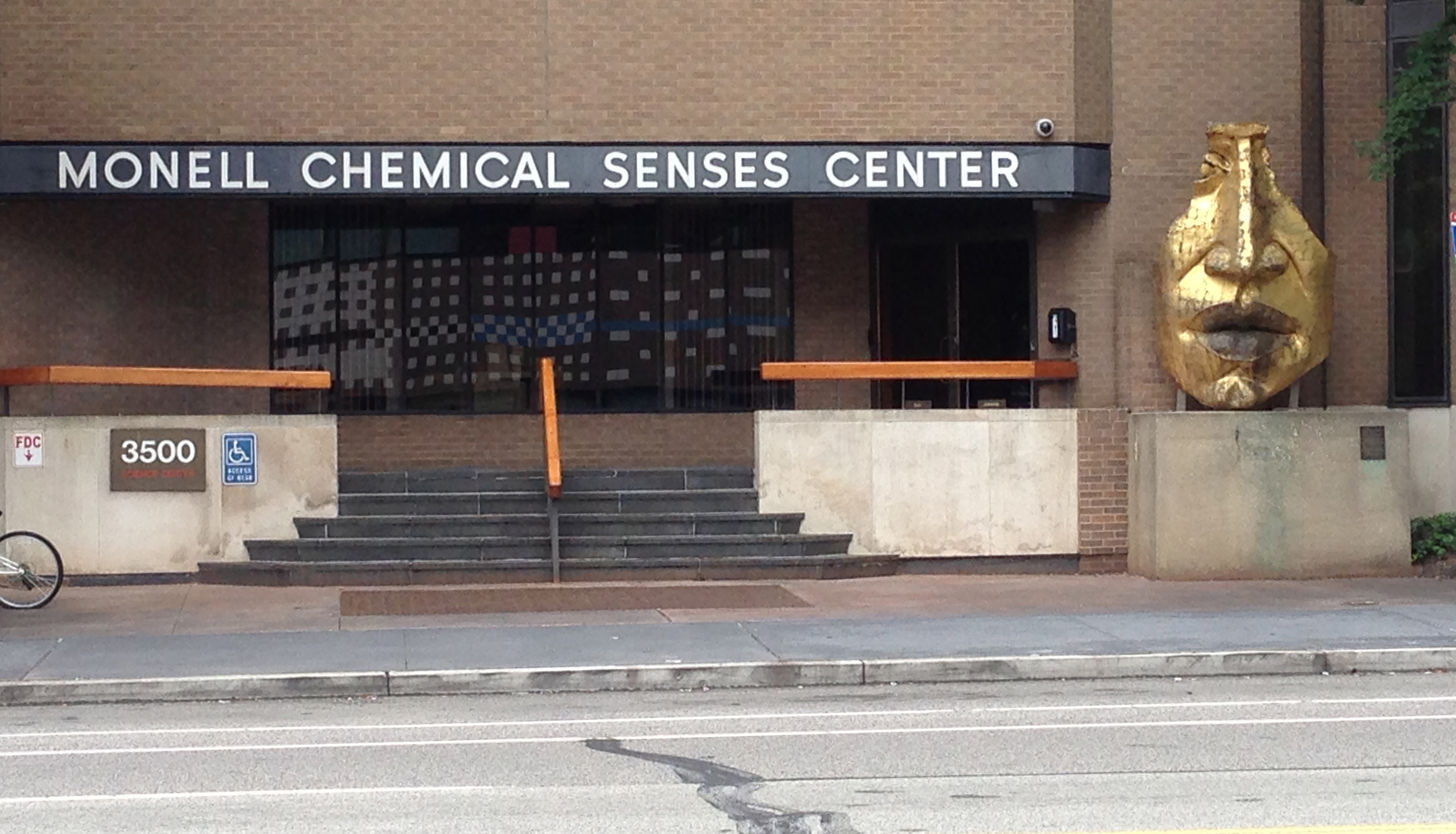
Monell Chemical Senses Center in Philadelphia, Pennsylvania USA
