= Mennella =

Mennella is an Italian surname. Notable people with the surname include:

- Julie Mennella, American biopsychologist
- Roberto Faraone Mennella (1971–2020), Italian jewelry designer

== See also ==
- Menella Bute Smedley (1820–1877), British novelist and poet
