= Melichar =

Melichar is a surname. Notable people with the surname include:

- Alois Melichar (1896–1976), Austrian conductor, music critic, film music composer and arranger
- Darlene Yee-Melichar (born 1958), American professor and coordinator of the Gerontology Program at San Francisco State University
- Josef Melichar (born 1979), retired Czech professional ice hockey player
- Leopold Melichar (1856–1924), Moravian entomologist
- Nicole Melichar (born 1993), Czech-born American tennis player
