= Kunio Yamazaki =

- Died: 11 April 2013
- Education: University of Tokyo
- Known for: Research on major histocompatibility complex
- Scientific career
- Fields: Biology
- Workplaces: Monell Chemical Senses Center

Dr. Kunio Yamazaki was a biologist who worked at the Monell Chemical Senses Center from 1980 until his death. Yamazaki is most notable for his extensive work with the major histocompatibility complex.

He has worked with Dr. Gary Beauchamp, also of Monell, before.
