= Michael Tordoff =

American geneticist

- Born: 1956 (age 69–70); Bradford, Yorkshire, UK
- Education: UCLA
- Known for: Work on calcium intake and appetite
- Scientific career
- Fields: Biology, Genetics
- Workplaces: Monell Chemical Senses Center

Dr. Michael G. Tordoff is a psychobiologist who worked at the Monell Chemical Senses Center. His research deals with the genetics and physiology of taste and nutrition. His early work addressed (a) how and what animals learn about the value of their food, (b) how artificial sweeteners influence appetite and body weight, (c) how salt intake is regulated, and (d) how dietary calcium influences salt intake. Recently, he has been investigating calcium taste and appetite. He is the primary proponent of the notion that calcium is a basic taste, equivalent to sweet, sour, salty, and bitter.

Dr. Tordoff hosts the Monell Mouse Taste Phenotyping Project. In August 2009, he bicycled across the USA in 27 days. He is married to, and often collaborates with, Dr. Danielle Reed.

== Recent publications ==
- Cherukuri, C. M.; McCaughey, S. A.; Tordoff, M. G. (2011). "Comparison of differences between PWD/PhJ and C57BL/6J mice in calcium solution preferences and chorda tympani nerve responses". Physiology & Behavior. 102 (5): 496–502. doi:10.1016/j.physbeh.2010.12.024. PMC 3049455. PMID 21219921.
- Tordoff, M. G. (2010). "Taste solution consumption by FHH-Chr nBN consomic rats". Chemical Senses. 35 (6): 473–489. doi:10.1093/chemse/bjq038. PMC 2885745. PMID 20478838.
- Bachmanov, A. A.; Inoue, M.; Ji, H.; Murata, Y.; Tordoff, M. G.; Beauchamp, G. K. (2009). "Glutamate taste and appetite in laboratory mice: physiologic and genetic analyses". American Journal of Clinical Nutrition. 90 (3): 756S–63S. doi:10.3945/ajcn.2009.27462l. PMC 3136004. PMID 19571213.
- De Jonghe, B. C.; Lawler, M. P.; Horn, C. C.; Tordoff, M. G. (2009). "Pica as an adaptive response: Kaolin consumption helps rats recover from chemotherapy-induced illness". Physiology & Behavior. 97 (1): 87–90. doi:10.1016/j.physbeh.2009.02.009. PMC 2680461. PMID 19419663.
- Tordoff, M. G.; Sandell, M. A. (2009). "Vegetable bitterness is related to calcium content". Appetite. 52 (2): 498–504. doi:10.1016/j.appet.2009.01.002. PMC 2768385. PMID 19260165.
- Guenthner, C. J.; McCaughey, S. A.; Tordoff, M. G.; Baird, J. P. (2008). "Licking for taste solutions by potassium-deprived rats: Specificity and mechanisms". BMC Genetics. 93 (4–5): 937–46. doi:10.1016/j.physbeh.2007.12.017. PMC 2410095. PMID 18255104.
- Reed, D. R.; Lawler, M. P.; Tordoff, M. G. (2008). "Reduced body weight is a common effect of gene knockout". BMC Genetics. 9: 4. doi:10.1186/1471-2156-9-4. PMC 2263071. PMID 18182103.
- Tordoff, M. G.; Shao, H.; Alarcón, L. K.; Margolskee, R. F.; Mosinger, B.; Bachmanov, A. A.; Reed, D. R.; McCaughey, S. A. (2008). "Involvement of T1R3 in calcium-magnesium taste". Physiological Genomics. 34 (3): 338–48. doi:10.1152/physiolgenomics.90200.2008. PMC 2519964. PMID 18593862.
- Tordoff, M. G. (2008). "Gene discovery and the genetic basis of calcium consumption". Physiology & Behavior. 94 (5): 649–59. doi:10.1016/j.physbeh.2008.04.004. PMC 2574908. PMID 18499198.
