= Karen Teff =

Geneticist

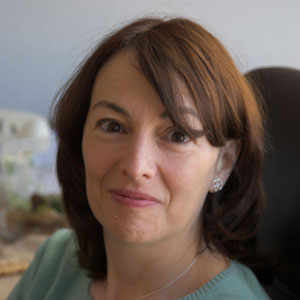
- Education: McGill University
- Known for: Effects of fructose on triglycerides in women
- Scientific career
- Fields: Biology, Genetics
- Workplaces: National Institutes of Health, Monell Chemical Senses Center, University of Pennsylvania
- Doctoral advisor: Simon Young

Karen Teff is a biologist and geneticist. She received her education in Canada and has since been working in the United States. Teff has spent most of her career studying the effects of diabetes and other related diseases on humans.

== Career ==
She currently works as Program Director, Division of Diabetes, Endocrinology, and Metabolic Diseases at the National Institute of Diabetes and Digestive and Kidney Diseases under the National Institutes of Health, and worked formerly at the Monell Chemical Senses Center. She worked for the University of Pennsylvania as the director of translational research for the university Diabetes Research Center from 2006 to 2013 as well as the director of clinical and translational research from 2011 to 2013.

== Education ==
Karen Teff received her undergraduate degree in nutrition from McGill University, where she worked under Gloria Tannenbaum at the Children's Hospital of Montreal. She later earned her Ph.D. from McGill University in 1988 under Simon Young.

== Research ==
In 1989, Teff published a paper concerning the effects of carbohydrate-heavy breakfasts on satiety. In 2004, she published a paper on the effects of fructose on triglycerides in women.

Teff is currently working at the NIDDK studying how bariatric surgery effects diabetes and diabetes-related diseases. She was previously the principal investigator of a clinical trial at the University of Pennsylvania Institute for diabetes, obesity, and metabolism, studying nervous system anti-inflammatory pathways in connection to obesity and diabetes. Teff's most recent publication in the American Journal of Physiology. Endocrinology and Metabolism focused on how the parasympathetic nervous system contributes to an increase in insulin secretion in patients with above average blood insulin levels.
