= Rose Marie Pangborn =

American food scientist

- Born: Rose Marie Valdes; 1932; Las Cruces, New Mexico, U.S.
- Died: March 17, 1990 (aged 57–58); El Macero, California, U.S.
- Other name: Rose Marie Valdes Pangborn
- Education: New Mexico State University, Iowa State University
- Occupations: Food Scientist, Food Technologist, Professor

Rose Marie Valdes Pangborn (1932 – March 17, 1990) was a Mexican-American food scientist, food technologist, professor, and a pioneer in the field of sensory analysis of food attributes. She worked as a sensory scientist in the Experiment Station, Step VIII, served for 35 years at the University of California, Davis. She co-founded the Association for Chemoreception Sciences (ACHEMS), and the Sensory Reception Scholarship Fund (SSSF).

== Early life and education ==
Born as Rose Marie Valdes in 1932 in Las Cruces, New Mexico to Mexican immigrant parents Leo and Rosalie Valdes. She earned a B.S. in 1953 at New Mexico State University and a M.S. in 1955 in Foods at Iowa State University. She married Jack Pangborn in 1956.

== Career ==
After joining the Department of Food Technology at the University of California, Davis (UC Davis) in 1955, Pangborn was pioneer in the field of sensory analysis of food attributes, publishing over 180 scientific articles and supervising over 40 graduate students in this area. Pangborn also studied how attitudes and beliefs influence food preferences. During 1972 until 1974, Pangborn was Associate Dean in the College of Agricultural and Environmental Sciences at UC Davis.

Pangborn also co-authored three textbooks, including the Principles of Sensory Evaluation by Amerine, Pangborn and Roessler, which has served as the definitive text for an entire generation of sensory scientists. She also served on the editorial boards of eight different scientific journals.

=== Awards ===
Her research and excellence in teaching would earn her the Institute of Food Technologists (IFT) William V. Cruess Award in 1977 and an IFT fellow in 1980. She was awarded an honorary doctorate from the University of Helsinki in 1984 and a "Pioneer" award from the American Society for Testing and Materials, Committee E-18 on Sensory Evaluation in 1989. In 1971, Iowa State University honored her work with an Outstanding Alumna Award. In 1973, she received a Distinguished Alumna Award, and in 1988 an Outstanding Alumna Award from New Mexico State University.

In 1984, she was awarded her the Doctor Honoris Causa in Food Science from the University of Helsinki.

It was in 1989 that she was awarded a Pioneer Award by the American Society for Testing and Materials.

== Death and legacy ==
Pangborn died on March 17, 1990, in El Macero, California, after battling cancer for five years.

There is a scholarship in her honor, the Pangborn Sensory Science Scholarship Fund (SSSF) is a $15,000 award given each year to a Ph.D. student who intends to teach and conduct research in the area of Sensory Science at the University level. At the IFT Annual Meeting (Institute of Food Technologists), the Sensory and Consumer Sciences Division has oral presentation graduate student competition which has been named in Pangborn's honor.

In 1978, Pangborn co-founded with Maxwell M. Mozel, Linda Bartoshuk, and Gary Beauchamp, the Association for Chemoreception Sciences (ACHEMS), an international professional society.

Dedicated in her memory, the Pangborn Sensory Science Symposium was founded in 1992 and is a biennial international meeting and conference of sensory scientists. The first symposium was organized in Finland in 1992, the Second at UC Davis and the third in Norway. Recent Pangborn Symposiums have been held in Rio de Janeiro, Gothenburg, Providence, Edinburgh, Nantes and Philadelphia.
