= Charles Wysocki =

Charles Wysocki may refer to:

- Charles Wysocki (biologist)
- Charles Wysocki (artist)
