= Morley Kare =

Dr. Morley Richard Kare (1922–1990) was a physiologist and biologist.

Morley Richard Kare was born in 1922 in Winnipeg, Manitoba. He received his bachelor's degree in agriculture from the University of Manitoba in 1943, his master’s in nutrition from the University of British Columbia in 1948 and his Ph.D. in physiology from Cornell University in 1952.

Dr. Kare taught physiology at Cornell University, North Carolina State University and the University of Pennsylvania. Although his early research focused on muscle biochemistry and metabolism, he became increasingly interested in the senses of taste and smell and how these senses contribute to nutrition and food choice across species. Kare is best remembered for founding the Monell Chemical Senses Center, a multidisciplinary basic research institute devoted to the science of taste and smell, located in Philadelphia, Pennsylvania. He served as the Center’s first Director from 1968 until his death in 1990, at which point Dr. Gary Beauchamp took over.

In his memory, the Monell Center created the Morley R. Kare Fellows Fund in 1990. The Fund helps support scientists beginning careers in the chemical senses.

== Notable publications ==
- In 1977, Dr. Morley Kare, with Dr. Michael Naim studied the "effect of oral stimulation on the cephalic phase of pancreatic exocrine secretion in dogs"
- In 1987, Dr. Morley Kare contributed to an investigation of umami taste, with Dr. Michael Naim and Dr. Ikuo Ohara
