= Association for Chemoreception Sciences =

International chemosensory science learned society

- Headquarters: Glenview, IL, U.S.
- Members: 600
- President: Alfredo Fontanini (2024–2025)
- Website: achems.org

The Association for Chemoreception Sciences is an international professional society in the field of chemosensory science. It is a non-profit organization that seeks to promote and advance the interests of the science of senses such as taste and smell. In order to do this, it holds an annual meeting that is a scientific forum for the research community and also provides outreach to the public about olfaction (smell), gustation (taste) and chemesthesis (trigeminal chemosensation).

The association was founded in 1978 by Maxwell M. Mozell, a neuroscientist at the State University of New York, with the help of a grant from the National Science Foundation. The first research meeting was held in Sarasota, Florida, in April 1979. Officers elected at the first meeting included Linda Bartoshuk, Rose Marie Pangborn and Gary Beauchamp.

A meeting is held in April of each year that is attended by an international cohort of physicians and scientists. This annual meeting consists of presentations on olfaction, gustation, and chemesthesis, as well as workshops sponsored by the National Institute of Health. Commercial exhibitors also attend the event. The organization has enjoyed strong support from the National Institute on Deafness and Communicative Disorders. and its director. In collaboration with two other scientific societies focused on the chemical senses – the European Chemosensory Research Organization and the Japanese Association for the Study of Taste and Smell – AChemS alternates as host of the quadrennial International Symposium for Olfaction and Taste. The last AChemS-hosted ISOT meeting took place in Portland, Oregon in August, 2020.

In 2004, AChemS member Linda Buck and Richard Axel were awarded the Nobel Prize in Physiology or Medicine "for their discoveries of odorant receptors and the organization of the olfactory system". To celebrate this honor, at the 2005 AChemS annual meeting, Buck and Axel were keynote speakers, recapping their research published in the journal Cell in 1991, which led to the Nobel award.

Chemical Senses, the official journal of the association, is published by Oxford University Press. The editor is Dr. Steven Munger; it was edited by Maxwell Mozell from 1992 until 1998.

The Association gives a series of annual awards, including the Max Mozell Award, the Barry Jacobs Memorial Award, the Don Tucker Memorial Award, the Ajinomoto Award, and the Polak Young Investigator Award. Travel awards are also given to diverse and young scientists to encourage their attendance at the meeting.
