= Alan Gelperin =

American biologist

- Education: University of Pennsylvania
- Known for: Fruit and vegetable scent scanner, electronic olfaction research
- Awards: Newcomb Cleveland Prize (1971)
- Scientific career
- Fields: Biology, genetics
- Workplaces: Princeton University, Monell Chemical Senses Center

Dr. Alan Gelperin is a scientist and biologist currently at Princeton University. He is an emeritus faculty member at Monell Chemical Senses Center. He specializes in electronic olfaction and computational neuroscience. He received his bachelor's degree in biology from Carleton College in 1962 and went on to get a Ph.D. from University of Pennsylvania.

He is most notable for his efforts in creating robots with electronic noses which can localize odors, and for the invention of a supermarket fruit and vegetable scanner that does not use barcodes but instead scans by scent.
