= Iris Berent =

Israeli-American settler psychologist

- איריס ברנט

Academic background
- Education: Tel Aviv University (BA); The Rubin Academy of Music (B. Mus.); University of Pittsburgh (MA, MS, PhD)
- Doctoral advisor: Charles Perfetti

Academic work
- Discipline: Cognitive psychology
- Institutions: Florida Atlantic University; Northeastern University
- Website: web.northeastern.edu/berentlab/people/pi/

Iris Berent (Hebrew: איריס ברנט) is an Israeli-American cognitive psychologist. She is a Professor of Psychology at Northeastern University and the director of the Language and Mind Lab. She is among the founders of experimental phonology—a field that uses the methods of experimental psychology and neuroscience to study phonological competence. She has also explored the role of phonological competence in reading ability and dyslexia. Her recent work has examined how laypeople reason about innate knowledge, such as universal grammar.

== Early life and education ==
Berent's undergraduate training was in music performance and musicology. She subsequently pursued research in music cognition, including fieldwork in ethnomusicology (in Mexico). Her early research sought to examine how listeners parse musical structure as they listen to music on-line, and how this process is shaped by both innate principles as experience with distinct musical idioms. She earned an MA degrees in Musicology and an MS degree in Psychology at the University of Pittsburgh. She was the recipient of a Predoctoral Mellon Fellowship. Her dissertation research (supported by a second Mellon Fellowship) examined the universal constraints on the sound pattern of language shapes the on-line representation of printed words (under Charles Perfetti). She earned her PhD in cognitive psychology, also from the University of Pittsburgh. She pursued Post-Doctoral research with Guy Van Orden at Arizona State University (supported by NIH NRSA award).

== Research and career ==
Berent has explored phonology as a window into the basis of the human capacity for language, and, more generally, into human nature.

Every natural language—spoken or signed—is composed of abstract patterns of meaningless elements (phonology). English, for example, allows syllables such as blog, but it disallows patterns like lbog. Moreover, syllables like blog are also more frequent across languages. Berent's research has examined whether phonological patterns are governed by tacit linguistic rules that are inborn in humans (universal grammar).

Most languages, however, realize phonological patterns as speech acts, so it is possible that the constraints on phonological patterns arise not from abstract linguistic rules but rather from the motor and sensory constraints on the production and perception of speech sounds. For example, blog might be preferred only because it is easier for the speech motor system to perceive and produce. Additionally, English speakers might prefer patterns like blog because these patterns are more familiar, not because people rely on abstract rules. Thus, knowledge of language could be due to factors are not specific to language, namely, sensorimotor constraints and experience.

Berent's research has examined both possibilities. One line of research has demonstrated that knowledge of language is governed by tacit algebraic rules, that are evident in adults (both speakers and signers.) and newborn infants. A complementary line of work has shown that speakers—adults and newborn infants—converge on the same abstract phonological rules even when these principles are unattested in their linguistic experience. The possibility that these phonological restrictions are governed by abstract rules is further supported by the discovery that these rules are spared in individuals with dyslexia—a reading disorder known to compromise low levels of speech processing (phonetics). These results suggest that phonological knowledge is not solely due to experience with certain sound patterns.

A second line of inquiry examined whether phonological restrictions reflect abstract linguistic principles or the sensorimotor constraints on speech processing, narrowly. To this end, Berent has compared phonological restrictions across two distinct language modalities—speech and signs. In one line of inquiry, she has shown that spoken and signed languages share common principles. Strikingly, speakers who have had no command of a sign language can spontaneously project those principles from their native spoken language to linguistic signs. A second line of work has demonstrated that people remain sensitive to phonological structure even when their brain motor system is temporarily altered (by mechanical stimulation and Transcranial Magnetic Stimulation. These results suggest that the restrictions on phonology are not solely restrictions on speech sounds.

Taken as a whole, Berent's research is consistent with the hypothesis that language is constrained by abstract rules that are inborn in humans (universal grammar). Innateness, however, is a thorny question in philosophy, psychology, and linguistics. To explore why discussions of innate knowledge elicit such strong reactions, Berent has recently begun examining how laypeople reason about human nature. The results suggest that people are systematically and selectively biased against the possibility that knowledge is innate. Berent traces these biases to the collision between two principles of core cognition—Dualism and essentialism.

Her work has been supported by funding from the National Institutes of Health and the National Science Foundation. She is the recipient of several awards, and a Fellow of the Association of Psychological Sciences.

== Publications ==
Her book The blind storyteller: How we reason about human nature (Oxford University Press, 2020) explores how core cognition meddles with our understanding of a host of topics, including why we go insane about our brain, why believe that psychiatric disorders like major depression are in our destiny (whereas dyslexia is “just in our heads”), and what we think happens when we die.

Berent is also the author of The Phonological Mind (Cambridge, 2013). Her scientific papers have appeared in journals such as Science, Proceedings of the National Academy of Sciences, Journal of Cognitive Neuroscience, Psychological Review, Cognition, Language, Trends in Cognitive Sciences, and Current Directions in Psychological Science.
