= Robert Margolskee =

American geneticist

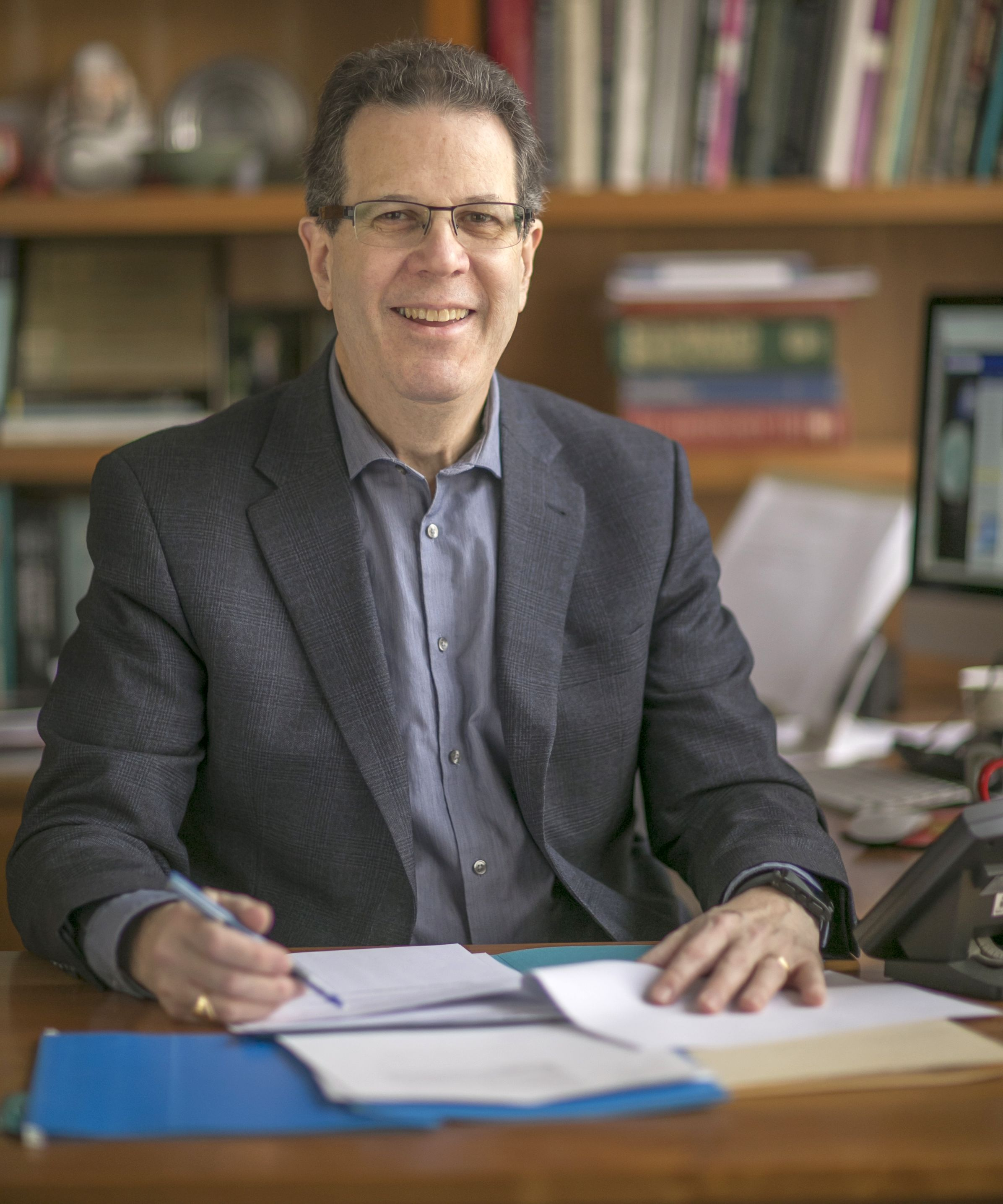
- Margolskee at Monell Chemical Senses Center
- Education: Harvard University; Johns Hopkins University
- Known for: Mammalian taste transduction
- Awards: IFF Award, Monell Mastertaste-Manheimer Award
- Scientific career
- Fields: Biology, molecular genetics
- Institutions: Monell Chemical Senses Center
- Doctoral advisor: Daniel Nathans

Robert F. Margolskee is an American academic. He is the director of the Monell Chemical Senses Center and adjunct professor in the Department of Neuroscience at the Mount Sinai School of Medicine. Margolskee is also the a co-founder of Redpoint Bio. Margolskee has been a pioneer in the application of molecular biology and transgenic animal models to the study of taste transduction and chemosensation. He has made numerous seminal discoveries in the taste field, including the identification and molecular cloning of taste specific receptors, G proteins, channels and other taste signal transduction elements.

== Early life and education ==
Margolskee received his A.B. in biochemistry and molecular biology from Harvard University. He received his an M.D. and a Ph.D in molecular genetics from Johns Hopkins University, where he studied with the late Nobel laureate Daniel Nathans. He carried out postdoctoral studies in biochemistry at Stanford University with Nobel laureate Paul Berg.

== Career ==
Margolskee’s first faculty appointment was in Neuroscience at the Roche Institute of Molecular Biology, where he also held an adjunct appointment in the Department of Biological Sciences of Columbia University. In 1996, Margolskee joined the faculty of the Mount Sinai School of Medicine. In 2009, he joined the faculty at the Monell Center. His work has been published in Nature, Science, Nature Neuroscience, and Scientific American.

=== Research ===
Margolskee’s basic science research focus has been on the molecular mechanisms of taste transduction, utilizing molecular biology, biochemistry, structural biology, electrophysiology and transgenesis to study the mechanisms of signal transduction in mammalian taste cells. In 1992, his laboratory discovered gustducin, a taste cell expressed G protein. Subsequently, Margolskee has demonstrated that gustducin is critical to the transduction of compounds that humans consider bitter, sweet or umami. Margolskee’s laboratory discovered the T1r3 sweet taste receptor in 2001 and the Trpm5 cation channel in 2002. Much of his current work is focused on 'taste cells of the gut' and 'endocrine cells of the tongue'. In 2007, he published back-to-back papers in the Proceedings of the National Academy shedding light on how the gut "tastes" nutrients. This new area of research has important implications for diabetes and obesity.

== Awards ==
Among his honors and awards are the Monell Mastertaste-Manheimer Award (now the Manheimer-Kerry award) and the IFF Award.
