= Julie Mennella =

American biologist

- Education: University of Chicago
- Known for: Prenatal and postnatal taste in infants, Women's health and infant development
- Awards: National Research Service Award, National Institute of Child Health & Human Development (1990-1992); Morley Kare Fellowship, Monell Center (1991-1993); FIRST Award, National Institute on Alcohol Abuse and Alcoholism (1993-1998); Avanelle Kirksey Lectureship Award, Purdue University, Department of Nutrition (1996); AChemS Moskowitz-Jacobs Award (1997); Elizabeth W. Bingham Award, Association for Women in Science Award (1999)
- Scientific career
- Fields: Biology, genetics, biopsychology
- Workplaces: Monell Chemical Senses Center

Julie Mennella is a biopsychologist specializing in the development of food and flavor preferences in humans and the effects of alcohol and tobacco on women's health and infant development. She currently works at the Monell Chemical Senses Center in Philadelphia, PA.

Some of her research has focused on how food preferences may be developed in the womb or during very early life.

== Select publications ==
- Mennella, JA; Beauchamp, GK (1991). "Maternal diet alters the sensory qualities of human milk and the nursling's behavior". Pediatrics. 88: 737–44. PMID 1896276..
- Mennella, JA; Jagnow, CP; Beauchamp, GK (2001). "Prenatal and postnatal flavor learning by human infants". Pediatrics. 107 (6): E88. doi:10.1542/peds.107.6.e88. PMC 1351272. PMID 11389286.
- Mennella, JA; Ventura, AK; Beauchamp, GK (2011). "Differential growth patterns among healthy infants fed protein hydrolysate or cow-milk formulas". Pediatrics. 127: 110–8. doi:10.1542/peds.2010-1675. PMC 3010087. PMID 21187303..
- Mennella, JA; Lukasewycz, LD; Castor, SM; Beauchamp, GK (2011). "The timing and duration of a sensitive period in human flavor learning: a randomized trial". Am J Clin Nutr. 93: 1019–24. doi:10.3945/ajcn.111.014381. PMC 3076653. PMID 21310829..
- Mennella, JA; Pepino, MY (2010). "Breastfeeding and prolactin levels in lactating women with a family history of alcoholism". Pediatrics. 125 (5): e1162-70. doi:10.1542/peds.2009-3040. PMC 2980825. PMID 20403941..
- Mennella, JA; Pepino, MY; Duke, FF; Reed, DR (2010). "Age modifies the genotype-phenotype relationship for the bitter receptor TAS2R38". BMC Genet. 11 60. doi:10.1186/1471-2156-11-60. PMC 3087510. PMID 20594349..
- Mennella, JA; Beauchamp, GK (2008). "Optimizing oral medications for children". Clin Ther. 30 (11): 2120–32. doi:10.1016/j.clinthera.2008.11.018. PMC 2744307. PMID 19108800..
- Forestell, CA; Mennella, JA (2007). "Early determinants of fruit and vegetable acceptance". Pediatrics. 120 (6): 1247–54. doi:10.1542/peds.2007-0858. PMC 2268898. PMID 18055673.
- Forestell, CA; Mennella, JA (2005). "Children's hedonic judgments of cigarette smoke odor: effects of parental smoking and maternal mood". Psychol Addict Behav. 19 (4): 423–32. doi:10.1037/0893-164X.19.4.423. PMC 1783765. PMID 16366814..
- Mennella, JA; Forestell, CA (2008). "Children's hedonic responses to the odors of alcoholic beverages: a window to emotions". Alcohol. 42 (4): 249–60. doi:10.1016/j.alcohol.2008.03.129. PMC 2483837. PMID 18539246..

== Awards and honors ==
In 2016, she was named a distinguished practitioner fellow of the National Academy of Practice. In 2020, Mennella received the Max Mozell Award for outstanding achievement in the chemical sciences from the Association for Chemoreception Sciences.

In 2025, she was awarded Ig Nobel Prize for "studying what a nursing baby experiences when the baby’s mother eats garlic", by "Maternal Diet Alters the Sensory Qualities of Human Milk and the Nursling’s Behavior".
