= Ó Breisleáin =

Ó Breisleáin was the surname of an Irish family, descended from the Cinel Enda, who were natives of Inniskeel on the Fanad peninsula in County Donegal. In 1261, they were forced out of the area by the MacSweeneys, moving to Derryvullan in County Fermanagh where they became brehons to the Maguire family.

The surname is anglicised as Breslin, with some anglicising further to Bryce, Brice and Bryson.
