= James Reitz =

American judge in Putnam County, New York

James Reitz was an American judge and politician from Putnam County, New York.

== Career ==
Reitz was a graduate of Carmel High School and received a bachelor's degree from Mercy University and then J.D. from Western Michigan University Thomas M. Cooley Law School. From 1996–2006, he was a town justice in Carmel, New York.

He instituted a Drug Treatment Court in Putnam County that provided residents with a controversial way to get a second chance in the judicial system. He was an acting justice for the US Supreme Court's 9th Judicial District from 2007 to his death in 2019. The courtroom in the Putnam Supreme and County Court in Carmel was renamed in 2019 in his memory.
