= Paul Breslin (footballer) =

Scottish footballer

Personal information
- Full name: Paul Breslin
- Date of birth: 2 October 1946 (age 80)
- Place of birth: Camlachie, Scotland
- Position: Outside left

Youth career
- Gowanbank Youth Club

Senior career*
Years	Team	Apps	(Gls)
1964–1965	Queen's Park	31	(6)
- Dunfermline Athletic

International career
1964–1965	Scotland Amateurs	3	(1)
- * Club domestic league appearances and goals

Paul Breslin (born 2 October 1946) is a Scottish retired amateur footballer who played outside left in the Scottish League for Queen's Park. He was capped by Scotland at the amateur level.
