= Pamela Dalton =

American psychologist

Pamela Dalton is a cognitive psychologist. She has a Ph.D. in experimental psychology and a Masters in Public Health. Dalton is frequently quoted by the popular press as an authority on environmental odors. She has done extensive research in the fields of sick building syndrome and multiple chemical sensitivity. In the past she has worked with the United States Department of Defense on nonlethal weapons development, or the enhancement of bad odors as weapons. She currently works at the Monell Chemical Senses Center.

== NIH Toolbox ==
Dalton was a contributor to the NIH Toolbox for the Assessment of Neurological and Behavioral Function, as a member of the NIH Toolbox steering committee and the Olfaction team, developing the NIH Toolbox Odor Identification Test. The contract for the NIH Toolbox for the Assessment of Neurological and Behavioral Function was initiated by the NIH Blueprint for Neuroscience Research in 2006 to develop a set of state-of-the-art measurement tools to enhance collection of data in large cohort studies in biomedical research.

== PTSD ==
Dalton has extensively researched the relationship between smell and negative memories. She has conducted experiments showing that a strong odourant can turn even a mundane experience into a vivid and permanent memory. This research has important implications for studying and treating PTSD.

Dalton continued this line of research in order to determine if it is possible to inoculate people with certain odors in order to prevent the formation of traumatic memories. She found that if you first exposed someone to a strong odor in a non-threatening environment and then exposed them to the same odor in a stressful, negative context there was no association between the smell and the negative memory.

Dalton's research led to the United States military changing how it trains soldiers. Mock combat environments used for training exercises now include olfactory cues designed to mimic smells like dead bodies, open sewers, melting plastic, etc.

== Stink bomb ==
Dalton was asked by the United States military to design a "stink bomb" in 1998. Dalton discovered that culture and geography mediate the sense of smell. Despite this problem, she eventually discovered a universally hated smell and packaged it as "Stink Soup."
