= Emmeline Edwards =

Haitian-American neurochemist

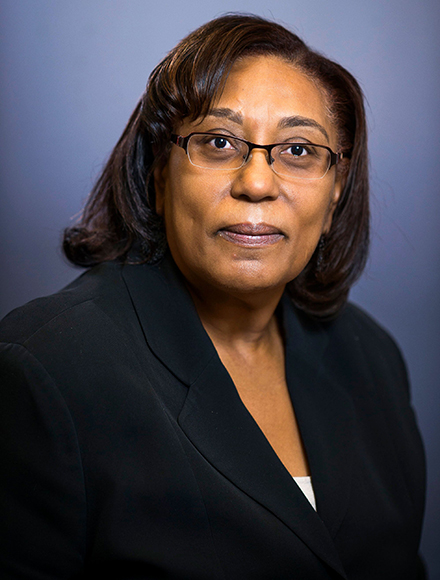
- Born: Haiti
- Education: College of New Rochelle (BA); Fordham University (PhD)
- Scientific career
- Fields: Behavioral neurochemistry
- Workplaces: University of Maryland, Baltimore; National Institutes of Health
- Thesis: Neurotransmitter systems in the Dahl model of hypertension; cholinergic and adrenergic interactions (1983)
- Doctoral advisor: Donald Clarke

Emmeline Edwards is a Haitian-American neurochemist serving as director of the division of extramural research at the National Center for Complementary and Integrative Health. She previously researched the neural mechanisms of complex behaviors and characterization of a genetic model of affective disorders at the University of Maryland, College Park. From 2000 to 2010, Edwards was deputy director of the extramural program at the National Institute of Neurological Disorders and Stroke.

== Early life and education ==
Edwards was born in Haiti. She completed a BA in chemistry at College of New Rochelle. Edwards earned a PhD in neurochemistry from Fordham University. She conducted postdoctoral research in behavioral pharmacology and neuroscience with Fritz Henn at Stony Brook University.

== Career and research ==
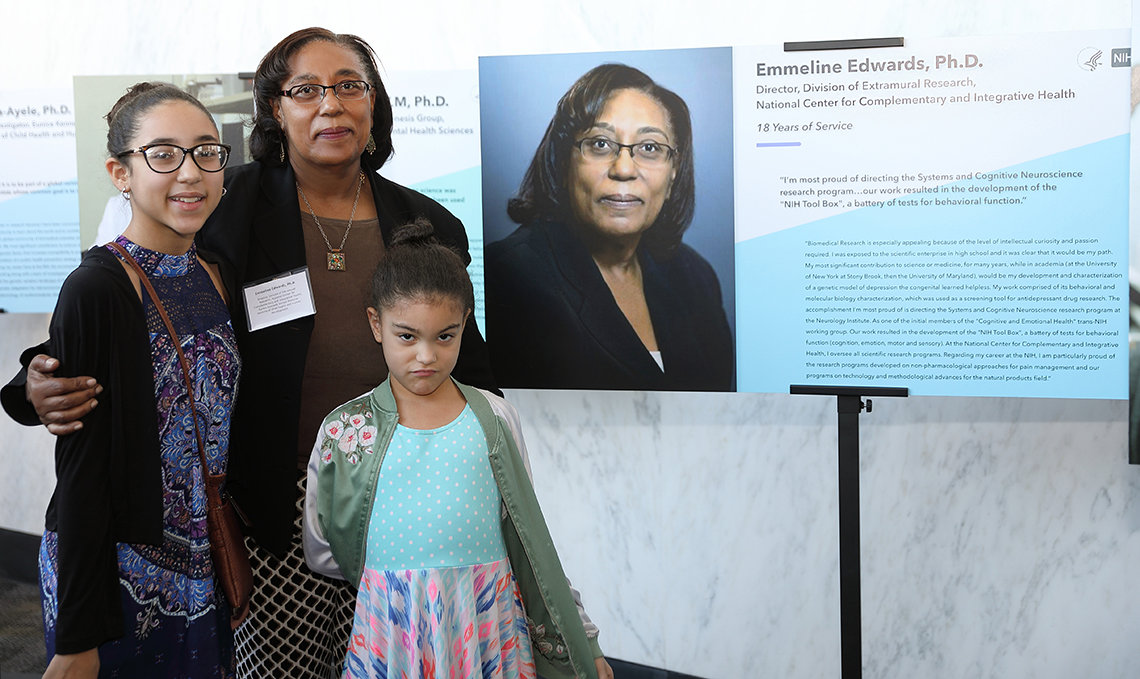
Edwards with her granddaughters at the 2019 NIH Black History Month Exhibition.

Edwards was a tenured associate professor in the Department of Pharmacology at the University of Maryland, Baltimore. Her research there focused on the neural mechanisms of complex behaviors and characterization of a genetic model of affective disorders. She also served as chair of the Graduate Studies and Research Committee and as a member of the Dean's Executive Council at the University of Maryland.

Edwards joined the National Institutes of Health in January 2000 where she served as deputy director of the extramural program at the National Institute of Neurological Disorders and Stroke (NINDS). At NINDS, she directed the Systems and Cognitive Neuroscience research program. As one of the initial members of the "Cognitive and Emotional Health" trans-NIH working group, their work resulted in the development of the "NIH Tool Box" a battery of test for behavioral function (cognition, emotion, motor and sensory). In 2010, she joined the National Center for Complementary and Integrative Health (NCCIH) as director of the division of extramural research. In that capacity, she is responsible for development of scientific programs or areas of science that fulfill NCCIH's mission as well as planning, implementation, and policy. She oversees the scientific research programs for complementary and integrative health including research programs developed on non-pharmacological approaches for pain management.

Edwards is chair of Women in World Neuroscience (WWN), an independent mentoring and networking organization with the primary mission of identifying, promoting, and implementing mentoring and networking opportunities for women neuroscientists across the world.
