= Chemical Senses =

- Discipline: Neuroscience, psychophysics, Food Science
- Language: English
- Edited by: Steven D. Munger

Publication details
- Former name(s): Chemical Senses and Flavor
- History: 1974–present
- Publisher: Oxford University Press
- Frequency: 9/year
- Impact factor: 3.160 (2020)

Standard abbreviations
- ISO 4: Chem. Senses

Indexing
- CODEN: CHSED8
- ISSN: 0379-864X (print); 1464-3553 (web)
- LCCN: 80649025
- OCLC no.: 936518594

Links
- Journal homepage; Online archive

Chemical Senses is a peer-reviewed scientific journal covering all aspects of chemoreception, including taste, smell, vomeronasal, and trigeminal chemoreception in humans and other animals. It is published by Oxford University Press and the editor-in-chief is Steven D. Munger (University of Florida). It is the official journal of the Association for Chemoreception Sciences, the European Chemosensory Research Organization, the Japanese Association for the Study of Taste and Smell, the Australasian Association for Chemosensory Science, and the Korean Society for Chemical Senses and Ingestive Behavior.

== History ==
The journal was established in 1974 as Chemical Senses and Flavor, with Howard Moskowitz and Egon Peter Köster as founding editors. Volumes 1 and 2 were published by D. Reidel Publishing Company. Beginning with volume 3 in 1978, Chemical Senses & Flavor was published by IRL Press in association with the European Chemosensory Research Organization. The journal title was changed to Chemical Senses in 1980. The publisher changed to Oxford University Press in 1989 (volume 14). An association with the Association for Chemoreception Sciences began in 1982 and with the Japanese Association for the Study of Taste and Smell in 1994.

== Abstracting and indexing ==
The journal is abstracted and indexed in:

- Aquatic Sciences and Fisheries Abstracts
- BIOSIS Previews
- CAB Abstracts
- Current Contents/Agriculture, Biology, and Environmental Sciences
- Current Contents/Life Sciences
- Embase
- Food Science & Technology Abstracts
- Index Medicus/MEDLINE/PubMed
- PASCAL
- ProQuest databases
- PsycINFO
- Science Citation Index
- Scopus
- The Zoological Record

According to the Journal Citation Reports, the journal has a 2020 impact factor of 3.160.

== See also ==
- Association for Chemoreception Sciences
- Olfaction
- Gustation
- Chemesthesis
