= Paul Breslin =

American geneticist

- Education: University of Pennsylvania
- Known for: Work with human oral perception and flies
- Scientific career
- Fields: Psychology, Genetics
- Workplaces: Monell Chemical Senses Center, Rutgers University

Paul Breslin is an American geneticist and biologist.

Breslin is most notable for his work in taste perception and oral irritation in humans as well as in Drosophila melanogaster, the common fruit fly.

Breslin is a member of the faculty at the Monell Chemical Senses Center and acts as director of the Science Apprenticeship Program. He is a professor in the Department of Nutritional Sciences at Rutgers, the State University of New Jersey. Breslin and two colleagues discovered that Oleocanthal, a compound found in extra-virgin olive oil, kills a variety of human cancer cells without harming healthy cells.
