= Ingestive behaviors =

Eating and drinking behaviours

Ingestive behaviors encompass all eating and drinking behaviors. These actions are influenced by physiological regulatory mechanisms; these mechanisms exist to control and establish homeostasis within the human body. Disruptions in these ingestive regulatory mechanisms can result in eating disorders such as obesity, anorexia, and bulimia.

Research has confirmed that physiological mechanisms play an important role in homeostasis; however, human food intake must also be evaluated within the context of non-physiological determinants present in human life. Within laboratory environments, hunger and satiety are factors that can be controlled and tested. Outside of experiments though, social constraints may influence the size and number of daily meals.

== Initiating ingestion ==
Body weight regulation requires a balance between food intake and energy expenditure. Two mechanisms are required to maintain a relatively constant body weight: one must increase motivation to eat if long-term reservoirs are being depleted, and the other must restrain food intake if more calories than needed are being consumed.

=== Signals from environment ===
The environment of early humans shaped the evolution of ingestive regulatory mechanisms, starvation used to be a greater threat to survival than overeating. Human metabolism evolved to store energy within the body to prevent death from starvation. Today, the environment now has an opposite effect on humans eating behaviors. With the widespread availability of food in today's society, concern has shifted from starvation to overeating. As food scarcity and availability have become less and less of a problem, food intake has increased. The increase of food intake by so many people is due primarily to a number of environmental factors. Main social environmental factors include:

- People who eat in groups tend to eat more than when they are by themselves
- When people eat in the presence of models who eat a lot or a little, they are likely to eat similarly to the model
- Individuals who eat in the presence of others who they think are watching them, tend to eat less than they do when they are by themselves

Along with social environmental factors, ingestive behaviors are also influenced by atmospheric environmental factors. Atmospheric factors include:

- Package sizing: the size of the packaging tends to influence what an individual thinks is the norm for consumption
- Food odor: unpleasant odors are likely to decrease ingestion, while pleasant odors are likely to increase ingestion
- Temperature of environment: people tend to eat more in cold climates and tend to drink more in warmer climates
- Lighting of environment: people are more likely to stay put and eat in an environment with dim lighting rather than harsh bright lighting

=== Signals from stomach ===
The gastrointestinal system, particularly the stomach, releases a peptide hormone called ghrelin. In 1999 experiments have revealed that hunger is communicated from the stomach to the brain via this hormone peptide. This peptide can stimulate thought about food, and is suppressed after food is ingested. Nutrient injection into the blood stream does not suppress ghrelin, so the release of hormone is directed by the digestive system and not by nutrient availability in the blood. These blood levels of ghrelin increase with fasting and are reduced after a meal. Ghrelin antibodies or ghrelin receptor antagonists inhibit eating. Ghrelin also stimulates energy production and signals directly to the hypothalamus regulatory nuclei that control energy homeostasis.

=== Metabolic signals ===
Hunger is the result of a fall in blood glucose level or depriving cells of the ability to metabolize fatty acids—glucoprivation and lipoprivation, respectively, stimulate eating. Detectors in the brain are only sensitive to glucoprivation; detectors in the liver are sensitive to both glucoprivation and lipoprivation outside the blood–brain barrier. However, no single set of receptors is solely responsible for the information the brain uses to control eating.

== Satiety signals ==
There are two primary sources of signals that stop eating: short-term signals come from immediate effects of eating a meal, beginning before food digestion, and long-term signals, that arise in adipose tissue, control the intake of calories by monitoring the sensitivity of brain mechanisms to hunger and satiety signals received.

=== Short-term signals ===
==== Head factors ====
There are several sets of receptors located in the head: eyes, nose, tongue, and throat. The most important role of head factors in satiety is that taste and odor can serve as stimuli that permit learning about caloric contents of different foods. Tasting and swallowing of food contributes to the feeling of fullness caused by the presence of food in the stomach.

==== Gastric and intestinal factors ====
The stomach contains receptors that can detect the presence of nutrients, but there are detectors in the intestines as well, and the satiety factors of the stomach and intestines can interact. Cholecystokinin (CCK) is a peptide hormone secreted by the duodenum that controls the rate of stomach emptying. CCK is secreted in response to the presence of fats, which are detected in by receptors in the duodenum. Another satiety signal produced by cells is peptide YY_{3-36} (PYY), which is released after a meal in amounts proportional to the calories ingested.

==== Liver factors ====
The last stage of satiety occurs in the liver. The liver is also the first organ to detect that nutrients are being received from the intestines. When the liver receives nutrients, it then sends a signal to the brain that produces satiety; but essentially, it is continuing the satiety that was already started by signals that arose from the stomach and upper intestine.

=== Long-term signals ===
Signals arising from the long-term nutrient reservoir of the body may alter the sensitivity of the brain to hunger signals or short-term satiety signals. A peptide, leptin, has profound effects on metabolism and eating. It is secreted by adipose tissue and it increases metabolic rate while decreasing food intake. Its discovery has stimulated interest in finding ways of treating obesity.

== Brain mechanisms ==
Neural circuits in the brain stem are able to control acceptance or rejection of sweet or bitter foods, and can be modulated by satiation or physiological hunger signals. Signals from the tongue, stomach, small intestine and liver are received by the area postrema and nucleus of the solitary tract, which then send information to many regions of the forebrain that control food intake. The lateral hypothalamus contains two sets of neurons that increase eating and decrease metabolic rate by secreting the peptides orexin and melanin concentrating hormone (MCH). Neuropeptide Y (NPY) in the lateral hypothalamus induces ravenous eating; neurons that secrete NPY are targeted by ghrelin in the hypothalamus. Leptin desensitizes the brain to hunger signals and inhibits NPY-secreting neurons.
