= George Preti =

American chemist (1944–2020)

- Born: October 7, 1944; Brooklyn, New York City, U.S.
- Died: March 3, 2020 (aged 75); Hatboro, Pennsylvania, U.S.
- Known for: Research on human body odors and TMAU
- Scientific career
- Fields: organic chemist
- Institutions: Monell Chemical Senses Center

George Preti (October 7, 1944 – March 3, 2020) was an analytical organic chemist who worked at the Monell Chemical Senses Center in Philadelphia, Pennsylvania. For more than four decades, his research focused on the nature, origin, and functional significance of human odors. Dr. Preti's laboratory has identified characteristic underarm odorants, and his later studies centered upon a bioassay-guided approach to the identification of human pheromones, odors diagnostic of human disease, human malodor identification and suppression and examining the “odor-print” of humans.

== Early life and education ==
Preti was born and raised in Brooklyn, New York. He received his B.S. in chemistry from the Polytechnic Institute of Brooklyn in 1966. He earned a Ph.D. in organic chemistry in 1971 from the Massachusetts Institute of Technology, with a specialty in organic mass spectrometry in the laboratory of Professor Klaus Biemann. That same year he joined the Monell Center.

== Career ==
Preti was also an adjunct professor in the Department of Dermatology of the University of Pennsylvania School of Medicine.

=== Research ===
In addition to having published dozens of peer-reviewed research articles, Preti held more than a dozen patents related to deodorance, odor mediated control of the menstrual cycle, and the use of odors in disease diagnosis. His unique area of research resulted in hundreds of clinician-directed referrals of patients with an idiopathic body and oral malodor production problems. His efforts in this area revealed a large, undiagnosed population of people suffering from trimethylaminuria, an odor-producing genetic disorder.

Preti’s work has frequently been cited by the news media, including The New York Times magazine section, The Philadelphia Inquirer, and ABC’s “Primetime: Medical Mysteries”.

=== Publications ===
- Johnson, A. T. Charlie; Khamis, Samuel M.; Preti, George; Kwak, Jae; Gelperin, Alan (2010). "DNA-Coated Nanosensors for Breath Analysis". IEEE Sensors Journal. 10 (1): 159–66. Bibcode:2010ISenJ..10..159J. doi:10.1109/JSEN.2009.2035670. S2CID 24496241.
- Kwak, J.; Willse, A.; Preti, G.; Yamazaki, K.; Beauchamp, G. K. (2010). "In search of the chemical basis for MHC odourtypes". Proceedings of the Royal Society B: Biological Sciences. 277 (1693): 2417–25. doi:10.1098/rspb.2010.0162. PMC 2894918. PMID 20356897.
- Preti, George; Leyden, James J (2010). "Genetic Influences on Human Body Odor: From Genes to the Axillae". Journal of Investigative Dermatology. 130 (2): 344–6. doi:10.1038/jid.2009.396. PMID 20081888.
- Wysocki, Charles J.; Preti, George (2010). "Human pheromones: What's purported, what's supported" (PDF). Sense of Smell Institute. Archived from the original (PDF) on 2012-06-19.
- Kwak, Jae; Opiekun, Maryanne Curran; Matsumura, Koichi; Preti, George; Yamazaki, Kunio; Beauchamp, Gary K. (2009). "Major histocompatibility complex-regulated odortypes: Peptide-free urinary volatile signals". Physiology & Behavior. 96 (1): 184–8. doi:10.1016/j.physbeh.2008.10.003. PMID 18957300. S2CID 24567511.
- Miyazawa, Toshio; Gallagher, Michele; Preti, George; Wise, Paul M. (2009). "Odor Detection of Mixtures of Homologous Carboxylic Acids and Coffee Aroma Compounds by Humans". Journal of Agricultural and Food Chemistry. 57 (21): 9895–901. Bibcode:2009JAFC...57.9895M. doi:10.1021/jf901453r. PMID 19817417.
- Miyazawa, T.; Gallagher, M.; Preti, G.; Wise, P. M. (2009). "Psychometric Functions for Ternary Odor Mixtures and Their Unmixed Components". Chemical Senses. 34 (9): 753–61. doi:10.1093/chemse/bjp062. PMC 2762054. PMID 19773409.
- Miyazawa, Toshio; Gallagher, Michelle; Preti, George; Wise, Paul M. (2009). "Methodological Factors in Odor Detection by Humans". Chemosensory Perception. 2 (4): 195. doi:10.1007/s12078-009-9060-6. S2CID 144279625.

== Death ==
He died on March 3, 2020, of bladder cancer in Hatboro, Pennsylvania.
