= Shaun Breslin =

British academic

Shaun Breslin FAcSS is Professor of Politics and International Studies at the University of Warwick, United Kingdom. He is considered a leading British academic expert on Chinese politics and economy, globalization, regionalism, governance and international political economy.

He is the author of China Risen: Studying Chinese Global Power (Bristol: Bristol University Press, 2021), China and the Global Political Economy (Basingstoke: Palgrave-Macmillan, 2007), Mao (Harlow: Longman, 2000, first edition 1998), and China in the 1980s: Centre-Province Relations in a Reforming Socialist State (Basingstoke: Macmillan and New York: St Martins, 1996). Breslin is also the co-author of four other academic books and numerous publications in his field.

Breslin is co-editor of The Pacific Review, senior research fellow at the Wong MNC Center, and associate research fellow of ISPI in Milan. He is also a fellow of the Academy of Social Sciences.
