= Danielle Reed =

American geneticist

Danielle R. Reed
- Citizenship: US
- Education: Yale University
- Known for: Genetic variation in taste and obesity in mice and humans
- Awards: IFF Award, 2008
- Scientific career
- Fields: Psychology, Genetics
- Workplaces: Monell Chemical Senses Center
- Doctoral advisor: Judith Rodin, Mark Friedman

Danielle Renee Reed is an American geneticist employed at the Monell Chemical Senses Center in Philadelphia, Pennsylvania. She is most notable for her papers regarding genetic variation in taste and obesity in mice and humans.

== Early life and education ==
Reed has a Ph.D. in psychology from Yale University, which she attended from 1984 to 1990.

Danielle Reed began her training as a scientist in the laboratory of Stephen Woods at the University of Washington, studying the role of hormonal signals on food intake in rodents. She did her doctoral dissertation with Judith Rodin at Yale University and Mark Friedman (scientist) at the Monell Chemical Senses Center, focusing on how rodent metabolism changes in response to short term exposure to high-fat diets. As a postdoctoral fellow in the laboratory of Arlen Price at the University of Pennsylvania, she learned human genetics, focusing on mapping of genes for human obesity and taste using family-based linkage methods.

== Career ==
She is most notable for her papers regarding genetic variation in taste and obesity in mice and humans. Reed's seminal studies on the genetics of bitter taste perception led to identification of a critical region of human Chromosome 5p15 whose variation correlated with a person's ability to taste the bitterness of PROP (propylthiouracil). This finding ultimately led to the discovery by Adler and co-workers (Charles Zuker) of a family of bitter taste receptors (taste receptor) located within this critical region of the chromosome. In 2008, Reed received the IFF Award For Outstanding Research On The Molecular Basis Of Taste in recognition of her contributions to the field, and delivered the IFF Lecture at the 2008 Association of Chemoreception Sciences (AChemS) meeting.. She served as President of AChemS from 2022 to 2024.

She established her own laboratory in 2001 at the Monell Chemical Senses Center and her research is divided between genetic mapping of obesity loci in rodent models and human genetics of taste and smell.

Reed has conducted numerous studies of identical twins in order to help tease our the genetic basis for taste and smell preferences.

She teaches a summer class called "A Taste of Chemistry," which is sponsored in part by The Camille and Henry Dreyfus Foundation. She collaborates with Mee-Ra Rhyu from the Korean Food Research Institute on the biology of human salt perception.

== Awards ==
International Flavor and Fragrance Award for excellence in research, 2008

== Select publications ==
- Mennella, J. A.; Pepino, M. Y.; Duke, F. F.; Reed, D. R. (2010). "Psychophysical Dissection of Genotype Effects on Human Bitter Perception". Chemical Senses. 36 (2): 161–167. doi:10.1093/chemse/bjq106. PMC 3020389. PMID 20980355.
- Pelchat, M. L.; Bykowski, C.; Duke, F. F.; Reed, D. R. (2010). "Excretion and Perception of a Characteristic Odor in Urine after Asparagus Ingestion: A Psychophysical and Genetic Study". Chemical Senses. 36 (1): 9–17. doi:10.1093/chemse/bjq081. PMC 3002398. PMID 20876394.
- Reed, D. R.; Zhu, G.; Breslin, P. A. S.; Duke, F. F.; Henders, A. K.; Campbell, M. J.; Montgomery, G. W.; Medland, S. E.; Martin, N. G.; Wright, M. J. (2010). "The perception of quinine taste intensity is associated with common genetic variants in a bitter receptor cluster on chromosome 12". Human Molecular Genetics. 19 (21): 4278–4285. doi:10.1093/hmg/ddq324. PMC 2951861. PMID 20675712.
- Reed, D. R.; Duke, F. F.; Ellis, H. K.; Rosazza, M. R.; Lawler, M. P.; Alarcon, L. K.; Tordoff, M. G. (2011). "Body fat distribution and organ weights of 14 common strains and a 22-strain consomic panel of rats". Physiology & Behavior. 103 (5): 523–529. doi:10.1016/j.physbeh.2011.04.006. PMC 3107863. PMID 21504752.
