= Charles Perfetti =

Psychologist

Charles Perfetti is the director of, and Senior Scientist for, the Learning and Research Development Center at the University of Pittsburgh. His research is centered on the cognitive science of language and reading processes, including but not limited to lower- and higher-level lexical and syntactic processes and the nature of reading proficiency. He conducts cognitive behavioral studies involving ERP, fMRI and MEG imaging techniques. His goal is to develop a richer understanding of how language is processed in the brain.

== Chinese and English word identification ==
Charles Perfetti focuses on recognizing specific components of reading which are generalized across cultures. In doing so he compares the word recognition processes of Chinese and writing. Perfetti's studies which are concerned with learning across writing systems, involve neuroimaging such as fMRI and ERP. In his research titled Sentence integration processes: An ERP study of Chinese sentence comprehension with relative clauses, Perfetti analyzed comprehension of various types of Chinese relative clauses to find out generalization and linguistic specificity of how sentence comprehension is processed. The idea of the study is based on the fact that object-extracted clauses increase in memory load which is why subject-extracted clauses are easier to comprehend. The fact that Chinese speakers lack grammatical relationships between arguments raises questions whether if the process of remembering a words context overshadows the extraction of clausal relationships. The English language is the opposite because sentences which are processed are structure-dependent.

This experiment was performed on twenty-one graduates from the University of Pittsburgh who were native Chinese speakers. Participants had to perform a written sentence task where they would read a sentence that interrupted the approved continuation with a relative clause. The results of what was called the norming study revealed that approval of subject verb-object continuations were high both subject extracted and object extracted clauses. Participants read experimental sentences that contain one of the two types of relative clauses. One version of experimental sentences was read within a session and the other version was read between five and ten minutes later. An electroencephalogram recording was collected for each participant who read a sentence in Chinese.

The results reveal that structure and meaning processes of Chinese reading and the process of different kinds of information are parallel to other languages. The ERP results conclude that sense and thought processes are generalized across languages. Event related potential readings shows that various types of information are available to be quickly accessed for comprehension. Posterior regions of the brain support word to referent processing while anterior regions provide thinking and memory processes to build on references. The process of processing information depends on continuous support of memory devices to identify limited relations as it hold onto information being referenced. Perfetti's finding conclude overall that Chinese sentence reading uses a neurological system that is susceptible to the hierarchical and sequential organization of linguistic judgment, reflecting the generalization of English.

For additional support on his research of comparing English and Chinese writing styles, Perfetti published an article called Writing Affects the Brain Network of Reading in Chinese: Functional Magnetic Resonance Imaging Study. In this study, Perfetti tested the hypothesis that the brain components used for reading characters are facilitated by writing Chinese characters. In this study, students from a Chinese class were placed into two conditions where they learned 30 Chinese characters in one condition and pinyin-writing in the other. The participants were 17 Carnegie Mellon undergraduates who had Functional Magnetic resonance imaging was administered on them while they completed a passive viewing and lexical decision. In the passive viewing condition, the participants viewed a stimulus that appeared on a computer screen for over 4 minutes. The stimulus consisted of 30 Chinese characters, 30 pinyin-writing characters, 30 novel characters, 30 English words. In the lexical decision task, participants had to figure out whether the stimulus was a real Chinese character or not and lasted for over 5 minutes.

The result concerning their behavioral performance during training revealed how decision times and lexical decision accuracy improved over the time span of 5 days for the character writing and pinyin-writing conditions. Results also revealed brain activation patterns for the passive viewing and lexical decision tasks. For passive viewing, there was greater activation for Chinese characters than for English words. The activation was found in the left inferior frontal gyrus, middle frontal gyrus, bilateral precuneus, bilateral superior parietal lobules, bilateral middle occipital gyri, and bilateral fusiform gyri. Perfetti also found greater activation for viewing English words than for viewing Chinese characters which was detected in the bilateral inferior frontal gyrus and bilateral superior temporal gyri. The results indicated that passive viewing impacted differences in language and general effects of learning, but none for specific effects of the training condition.

For the lexical decision task, greater activation was found in the character-writing condition more than the pinyin-writing condition. The areas of the brain that were activated are the bilateral superior parietal lobules and the inferior parietal and postcentral gyrus. The results suggest that the identifying of learned characters in the character-writing training condition promoted activation of components used for the previous training exercise before. When activation was greater in the character-writing condition for the pinyin-writing condition than the character-writing condition, it existed in the right inferior frontal gyrus. There was also activation found in the bilateral middle occipital gyri, precuneus, and left temporal gyrus for learned characters than novel characters.

Overall, the results reveal that greater activation was detected in the bilateral lobules, bilateral middle occipital gyri, bilateral fusiform gyri, and left dorsal inferior frontal gyrus for Chinese characters than for analyzing English words. However, greater activation was found in the ventral left inferior frontal gyrus and left superior posterior temporal gyrus for analyzing English words rather than Chinese characters. This suggests that English speakers are able to account for specific features of the visual form shown for Chinese characters and mapping from visual form to pronunciation and meaning. This demonstrated by revealing greater activation for (BA 9). Character writing influences components not used for native languages at the visual and mapping form. Writing however, improves the quality of visual-orthographic representation, revealing increase activation for bilateral lingual gyri and bilateral superior parietal lobules.

== Lexical quality ==
In exploring the Lexical Quality Hypothesis Charles Perfetti focuses on analyzing the brain's fundamentals of being able to read. In Reading Ability: Lexical Quality to comprehension, Perfetti states, that differences in characteristics of word comprehension impacts reading ability and comprehension. High-lexical qualities partly involve the spelling of a word as well as the manipulation of meaning about a word which allows meaning retrieval at a rapid pace. However, low quality representations of a word promote word-related difficulties in comprehension of a text. His first set of results reveals that comprehension depends on lexical skill and describes the disconnections that focus specifically on comprehension skills. As for word linguistic processing, studies reveal skill difference are found in through the analysis of confusing word meanings. The Event Related Potentials performed on rare vocabulary meaning unveil how skilled readers acquire words better and reveal stronger ERP indications of word learning. In addition, these results propose that there are skill differences in understanding the orthographic representation of a word. ERP results also show that there are skill differences in comprehending and processing of ordinary words. Finally, they demonstrate problems for low-skilled readers with interpreting words with prior text. In doing so, Perfetti provides findings that suggest word-knowledge impacts the processing of word meaning and comprehension.

His findings also focus on the importance of lexical Representations and how it facilitates differences in individuals who perform comprehension task. In his article Learning words in Zekish: Implications for understanding Lexical Representation, He describes their studies of phonology, orthography and comprehension. For phonology his research considers the sounds that exist in language and how they collaborate to form other words. When discussing orthography the spelling of words and how a language can facilitate the spelling of words. When analyzing comprehension, he considers lexical knowledge that is placed into a system which can provide and maintain what is represented in a text being read. Perfetti argues that words have a purpose that serve as a baseline acquiring reading skill and are important for understanding the components of a word that affect the knowledge of a word. In addition, he proposes that writing words within a text determines the rate at which a word is encountered. Therefore, each individuals reading experience is adjusted to the rate at which words are written into a context of words personally encountered words.

In discussing how lexical quality is acquired, Perfetti proposes that aspects of experiencing language can facilitate higher or lower lexical quality for word representations. This research reveals that higher lexical quality representations can support better comprehension of text. To provide evidence of this, Perfetti analyzes three types of lower lexical quality words and what they contribute to the processing of text. The types of words consist of homographs, ambiguous words and homophones. Homographs are words that have the same spelling but two different meanings in a language, depending on how they are pronounced. For example the word bass can be pronounced one way to mean fish or another way to represent a musical instrument. When words like this are presented to a reader, no specific lexical item is activated. Instead, two lexical items activated through semantic judgment and lexical decision while naming the word.

Ambiguous words consist of the same spelling but have two or more meanings. For example the word spring can mean a season or metal coil. When ambiguous words are read, there is an activation of both meanings. Meanings for this word can mainly be acquired through the extent of bias found in the context of which the word appears word structure and the rate at which each meaning is utilized. Homophones are words that consist of two different spellings and meanings. They pose a problem for lexical quality because there is activation for both meanings and both spellings. For example air describes the atmosphere while heir describes inheritance. However, the process of disambiguate homophones differs from the process used for ambiguous words because the spelling of homophones allows a reader to disambiguate on their own. For several semesters, Perfetti tested 800 psychology students over the course of several semesters. The students were given reading task to assess their levels of spelling, word sounding and comprehension skills. His claim was that the rate at which words are experienced and reading skill administers a readers experience with words. He found out that by making sure participants knew both meanings of homophone pairs, achievement of skilled and less skilled readers could be assessed. Furthermore, educating participants on lower exposed members of homophones can reverse the confusion of comprehension to the point that they become higher frequency words.

== Learning New Words ==
Charles Perfetti published an article titled word Learning: An ERP investigation of word experience effects on recognition and word processing to assess the quality learning new words. In this study, adults with various levels of reading comprehension skills learned rare unknown English words. 500 college undergrads were divided into three conditions in which they learned words that were manipulated. In the first condition (orthography-to-meaning), participants had to learn the spelling and meaning of a word. Participants in the second condition (orthography-to-phonology) had to learn both the pronunciation and spelling of the word. For the third condition (phonology-to-meaning), these participants had to learn not only the meaning of the word, but its pronunciation as well. In the experiment, each of these conditions were followed by a learning phase that which would then assess the familiarity of the learned words.

The results showed faster reaction times for learned and familiar words than that of unlearned and rare words while the response times for correct decisions were faster than incorrect decisions. There was a significant main effect for word type, but not for word type x relatedness. This kind of word type revealed how learners were faster at responding to related trials in the orthography-to-meaning and phonology trials. The interaction for word type x correctness revealed a difference in decision times. This was found in the orthography-to-meaning and phonology-to-meaning conditions for familiar words. The results conclude that reinforcing the words orthography might help readers recognize a word in future encounters which will influence the process of incremental learning.

== Text Comprehension ==
In his article titled Writing Strengthens Orthography and Alphabetic-Coding Strengthens Phonology in Learning to Read Chinese, Perfetti studies the word based inference processes of text comprehension. He argues that learning how to write words may improve orthographic representations and support word-specific identification processes. The rule relates to Chinese language where the writing system promotes character-specific identification depending on accuracy representation of how a word is spelled. This experiment consisted of two studies that tested the hypothesis by analyzing learners of the Chinese language. The participants consisted of 67 Carnegie Mellon undergrad students. In the first experiment, a total of 54 traditional Chinese characters were selected to be use. The characters would be placed into three groups matched by their spelling, stroke number, number of radicals, and English-transition rate. In the first group characters were presented in the condition for read-only and handwriting for the second group. For the third group, nothing was taught, just used for novel control stimuli. 36 characters were taught over a three days period while visual and audio files of the characters were administrated by a server.

Due to the fact that participants were learners and not readers of Chinese, there was an expectation of lexical decision being the influence of learning. The results reveal a constant learning effect in the handwriting condition more than the reading condition. The handwriting effects consisted of retrieval for English meaning. These results indicate performances in the writing condition were continuously better than the reading condition. The interpretation of this higher quality form when they are taught with handwriting. In experiment two, participants had to type in Pinyin and tone associated with character. Not only were they given three attempts but only correct or incorrect feedback was given in response. In both of the learning conditions, participants were told to match the link of each character with its meaning and pronunciation. The results revealed a consistent effect for handwriting. The writing+ writing condition performed better on orthographic memory mapping task overall conclusion is that character writing as part of learning to read supports character reading.

== Learning a second language ==
Charles Perfetti and colleagues conducted a study called High Proficiency in a second Language is characterized by Greater Involvement of the First Language Network: Evidence from Chinese Learners of English to examine the processes of learning a second language. The first thing he does is talk about the assimilation and accommodation hypothesis that involve the process of learning a second language. The assimilation hypothesis argues that second language is learned through the brains access of networks used to process the native language. Accommodation hypothesis argues that learning of a second language depends on brain structures not involve in process of the native language. Two test these hypothesis, Perfetti and colleagues examined a group of Chinese speakers who happened to be late learners with various levels of proficiency in English. The experiment was divided into 3 groups. The (ce group), (cc group) and (ee group) consisted of Chinese speaking participants who performed an English word rhyming judgment task while fMRI was performed. Assimilation was analyzed by comparing the cc group to the ce group while accommodation was analyzed by comparing the (ee group). The study involved participants deciding whether two symbol patterns presented in sequence match or mismatched. Rhyming was seen as the same rhyme for the second character of the word while orthography was defined as having the same phonetic radical for the second character of the word.

Results for accuracy revealed a significant main effect for group as the ce group revealed lower accuracy than the cc and ee groups. In addition, more comparisons revealed that ee groups had faster response times than the ce group and cc group. However, the ce group and the cc group did not differ significantly. There was a similar activation of all groups found in left hemisphere components such as inferior/middle occipital gyri, inferior temporal/fusiform gyri, inferior/middle frontal gyri, and inferior parietal lobule. In the right hemisphere of the brain, activation was shown in the middle occipital gyrus, inferior Parietal lobules and middle frontal gyri. The findings concluded that Chinese components used to process the reading of English and Higher proficiency with increased involvement of Chinese component and reduced association of English components. These findings suggest that English involves assimilation of Chinese speakers who learn to speak English.
