= George Gallego =

American paratriathlete and entrepreneur

Medal record

Men's paratriathlon

Representing United States

World Championships
Bronze medal – third place	2009 Gold Coast	TRI 1

George Gallego (born c. 1966) is an American paratriathlete and entrepreneur. He is the founder and CEO of Wheels of Progress and co-founder of the Axis Project. Via Access Initiatives, he opened two gyms geared toward helping people with disabilities: one in Brooklyn and the other in Manhattan. In 2021, he opened the restaurant Contento in East Harlem. The restaurant is designed to be wheelchair accessible throughout, and the menus include QR codes for visually impaired guests to have the menu read aloud to them via their smart phone.

Gallego received his bachelor's and master's degrees in organizational leadership from Mercy University. He also attended Fordham University and Cornell University for graduate studies.

Gallego became paralyzed from the waist down circa 1990 at age 23 after falling out of a third-story window at a construction site. He became depressed gained a significant amount of weight after the accident and divorced his wife. Eventually, Gallego began exercising. He entered his first handcycling race in 2005 and his first New York City Triathlon in 2007.

Gallego met his wife, Julia Kahn-Gallego, at the 2007 New York City Triathlon; they were married in 2009. Gallego has three children.
