= Darlene Yee-Melichar =

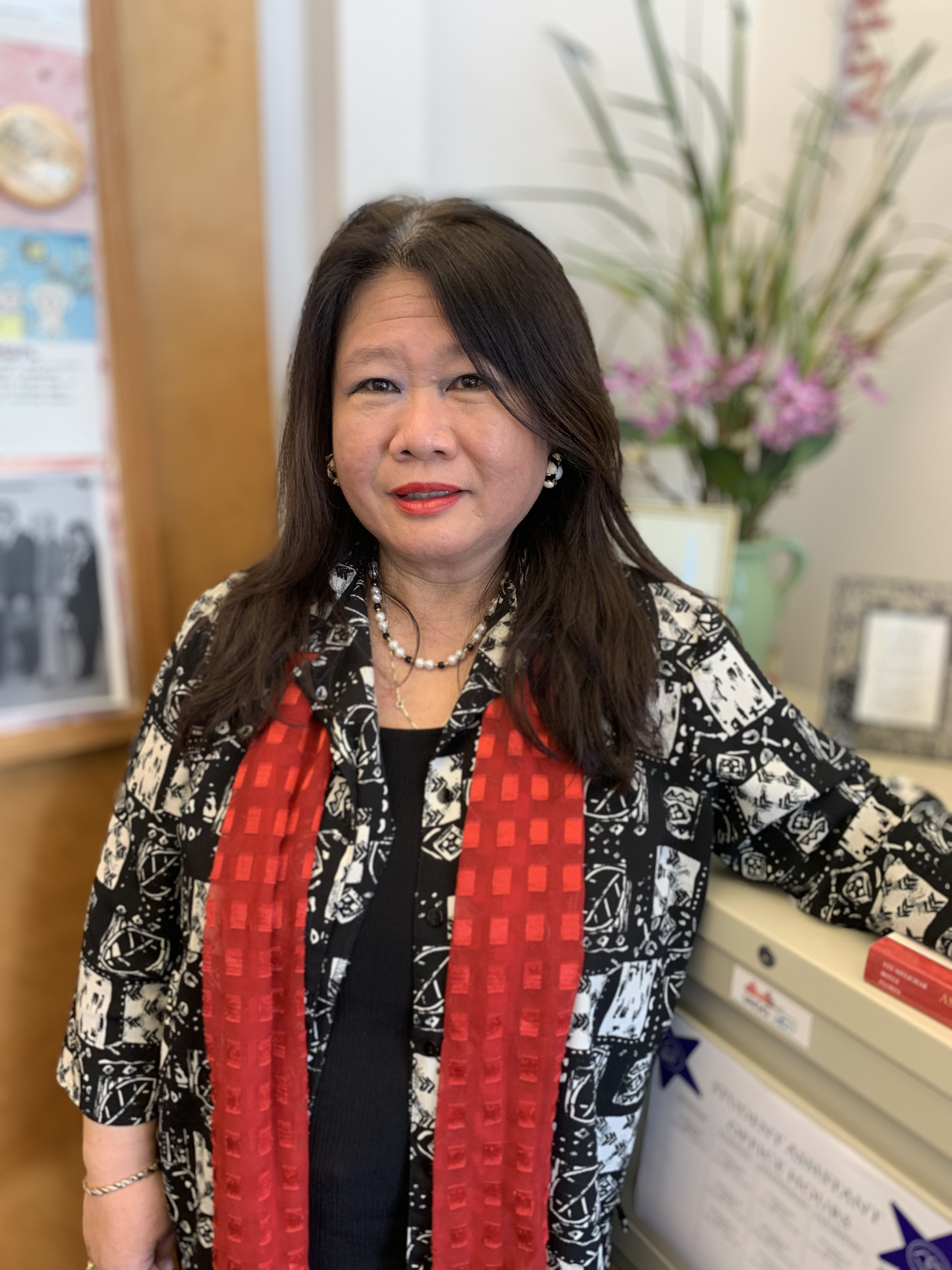
- Born: Darlene Yee; September 19, 1958; New York, NY, United States
- Education: Columbia University; College of New Rochelle; Barnard College
- Occupation: author, educator, scholar
- Website: https://faculty.sfsu.edu/~dyee/home

Darlene Yee-Melichar is professor and coordinator of the gerontology program at San Francisco State University where she also serves as Director of Long-Term Care Administration. In 2023, she was appointed to the CSU Board of Trustees as the faculty trustee by California Governor Gavin Newsom.

== Early career ==
Yee-Melichar was born in 1958 and graduated with a bachelor's degree in Biological Sciences from Barnard College. She received a master's degree in gerontology from the College of New Rochelle and a second master's degree in health education from Teachers College of Columbia University. Yee-Melichar received a doctoral degree in Health Education and post-doctoral training in Computer Management Systems from Teachers College of Columbia University. She augmented her academic training as a Certified Health Education Specialist.

Yee-Melichar worked as an assistant professor of Health Education and Gerontology at York College, CUNY (The City University of New York) from August 1985 to July 1988. She became an associate professor of Health Promotion and Gerontology at the University of Texas Medical Branch at Galveston from August 1988 to July 1990. As of August 1990, Yee-Melichar works as a full professor of Gerontology at San Francisco State University.

== Scholarship ==
Yee-Melichar is recognized as an international authority on two areas of specialization in gerontology: healthy aging, and long-term care administration.

Her scholarship focuses on these two important areas of expertise. Yee-Melichar's research interests in healthy aging, long-term care administration, minority women's health, and safety research and education are reflected in 4 books, 107 journal articles, book chapters, book reviews, technical reports, and numerous professional and scholarly presentations. She is a Charter Fellow of the Association for Gerontology in Higher Education, Fellow of the Gerontological Society of America, Fellow of the AAHPERD Research Consortium, and Full Member of Sigma Xi, the national research society.

== Gerontologist and long-term care advocate ==
Yee-Melichar was active on the NIH Advisory Committee for Research on Women's Health, NIH Review Committee for Research Enhancement Awards Program, and AHRQ special emphasis panels on "Translating Research into Practice" and "Health Research Dissemination". She chaired the U.S. DHHS-OWH Minority Women's Health Panel of Experts; contributed to the U.S. DHHS-Centers for Medicare & Medicaid Services' Advisory Panel on Outreach and Education, and U.S. DHHS-OWH Region IX Women's Health Advisory Council; and is active on the OMH-NPA Regional Health Equity Council for Region IX (RHEC IX), and IAGG 2017 World Congress on Gerontology Local Arrangements Committee

Yee-Melichar has served on the Editorial Boards of numerous journals including the Journal of Gerontological Social Work and Journal of Health Education; and serves on the Board of Directors for the California Advocates for Nursing Home Reform and as President of SF State's Chapter of Sigma Xi, the national research society.

== The California State University System - Board of Trustees ==
In June 2023, Yee-Melichar was appointed by Governor Gavin Newsom to serve as the Faculty Trustee on the California State University (CSU) Board of Trustees, the 25-member governing body of the CSU system. The Board of Trustees is responsible for the oversight of the California State University. The Board adopts rules, regulations, and policies governing the 22 campus system. The Board also has authority over curricular development, use of property, development of facilities, and fiscal and human resources management. She represented CSU faculty on the Board for a two-year term expiring in 2025. As of 2026, Yee-Melichar has continued to serve in the Faculty Trustee role pending appointment of a replacement, trustees may continue serving beyond the expiration of their stated term until a successor is appointed and qualified.

As Faculty Trustee, she participates in board and committee meetings, contributing faculty perspectives to discussions on academic policy, governance, budgeting, and systemwide priorities. The Faculty Trustee position is one of two seats on the Board designated for internal university constituencies, alongside the Student Trustee.

== Publications ==
In addition to 107 journal articles, book chapters, book reviews and technical reports, Yee-Melichar co-authored and co-edited four textbooks:

- Long-Term Care Administration and Management Effective Practices and Quality Programs in Eldercare
- Assisted Living Administration & Management: Effective Practices and Model Programs in Elder Care
- Minority Women's Health: Current Issues in Research, Education and Practice
- Aging in Contemporary Society: Translating Research Into Practice

== Select awards and honors ==
Yee-Melichar is the recipient of many awards and honors for teaching excellence and service contributions to the campus, community, and profession.

- Appointed as Co-Chair of the IAGG 2017 World Congress on Gerontology Local Arrangements Committee
- Appointed as Co-Chair of the U.S. DHHS-OMH Region IX Regional Health Equity Council, Fall 2016
- Appointed as Co-Chair of the Gerontological Society of America (GSA) Program Committee for the 2015 Annual Scientific Conference, Fall 2013
- Appointed as Member of the Region IX Women's Health Advisory Council, Fall 2011
- Community Service Learning Award from San Francisco State University, April 2003
- Distinguished Alumni Award from Teachers College, Columbia University, November 2001
- Appointed as Member of the National Institutes of Health (NIH) Advisory Committee for Research on Women's Health, Fall 1999
- Appointed as Member of the U.S. Department of Health & Human Services– Office on Women's Health (DHHS-OWH) Minority Women's Health Panel of Experts, Fall 1998
- Appointed as Member of the Agency for Healthcare Research & Quality (AHRQ) emphasis panels on Translating Research Into Practice and Health Research Dissemination Implementation, Fall 1998
- Elected as Charter Fellow, Association of Gerontology in Higher Education, 1997
- Appointed as Member of the NIH Task Force for the Office of Research on Women's Health, 1996
- Appointed as Member of the NIH Task Force for the Office for Protection from Research Risks, 1996
- Elected as Fellow, Social Research, Policy and Practice Section, The Gerontological Society of America, 1994
