= Monell Chemical Senses Center =

US research institute

Coordinates: 39.9558°N 75.1931°W

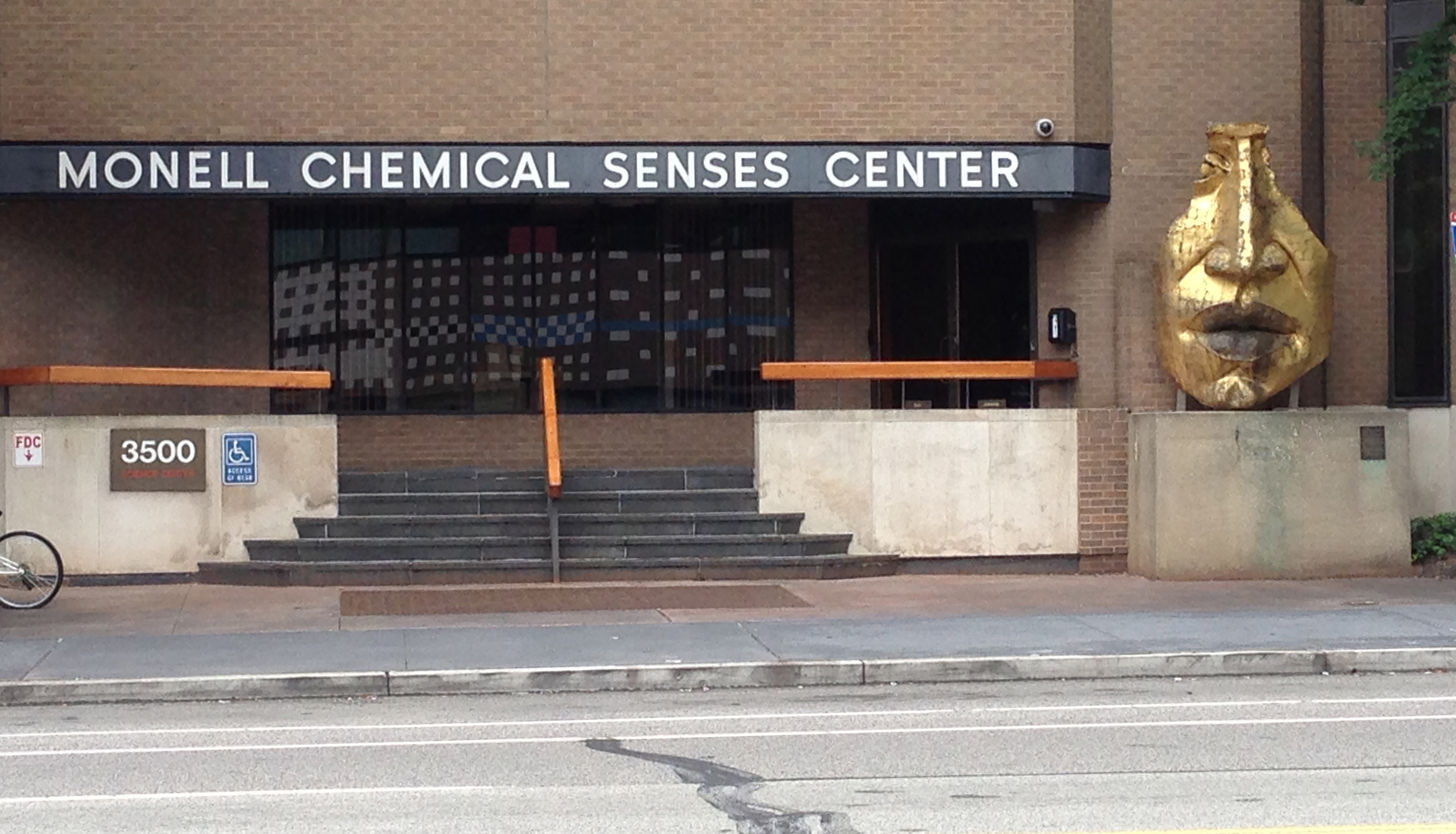
- Entrance to the Monell Chemical Senses Center
- Established: 1968
- Director: Robert Margolskee
- Address: 3500 Market Street, Philadelphia, Pennsylvania, U.S.
- Location: Philadelphia, Pennsylvania, U.S.
- Website: monell.org

The Monell Chemical Senses Center is an independent, non-profit scientific research institute located at the University City Science Center campus in Philadelphia. Founded in 1968, it is dedicated to interdisciplinary basic research on the senses of taste and smell. The center's mission is to improve health and well-being by advancing the scientific understanding of taste, smell, and related senses. Monell's research focuses on various aspects of chemosensory science, including how chemical senses affect human health, behavior, and the environment. The center employs a collaborative and interdisciplinary approach, with scientists from diverse fields such as sensory psychology, biophysics, chemistry, behavioral neuroscience, environmental science, and genetics working together on research projects.

As of 2024, Monell scientists have produced over 2,000 peer-reviewed journal articles and book chapters, published in a wide range of high-impact research, biomedical, and clinical journals. The center also offers training programs for postdoctoral fellows, visiting scientists, and students, and collaborates with academic institutions and international corporations in various industries. Monell maintains strong connections with over 30 industrial partners in fields such as food, flavor, fragrance, pharmaceuticals, and technology.

== History ==
Monell was founded in 1968. The center's mission is to advance knowledge of the mechanisms and functions of the chemical senses. Knowledge gained from Monell’s research is relevant to issues related to public health, national health policy, and quality of life, including studies of obesity, diabetes, hypertension, pediatric health, occupational safety, environmental interactions, and national defense.

Monell has a staff of more than 50 scientists and provides research opportunities for local high school and undergraduate students. Situated in Philadelphia’s University City Science Center, the center occupies two buildings with a total of 80,000 square feet (7,400 m^{2}). Monell is operated as a non-profit organization and receives funding from government grants, primarily from the National Institutes of Health through the National Institute on Deafness and Other Communication Disorders and the National Institute of Diabetes and Digestive and Kidney Diseases, as well as from private foundations and unrestricted corporate gifts.

== Research ==
=== Selected achievements ===
- Characterized the first sweet-tasting protein, “Monellin,” broadening the concept of sweet taste
- Demonstrated that body odors can signal disease even before appearance of overt symptoms
- Revealed critical role of perinatal experience in establishing flavor preferences of infants, children, and adults
- Described role of liver chemosensors in control of appetite and satiety.
- Established that genetically-determined odortypes provide signals of individual identity.
- Developed the labeled magnitude scale to reliably measure human sensory perception.
- Pioneered use of living human tissue to characterize human olfactory and taste cell function.
- Identified the Sac locus coding for the TAS1R3 receptor, one of the receptors for the sweet taste.
- Established use of chemosignals as effective nonlethal means of vertebrate pest control.
- Demonstrated the role of diet in adult preference for salty taste.
- Combined sensory and genetic approaches to document unique sensory worlds for every individual.
- Used sensory properties of olive oil to identify oleocanthal, a novel anti-inflammatory compound.

=== Social decisions and olfactory cues in children ===
In 2016, Monell announced that it had completed research that found toddlers use sensory information to make social decisions. The study included 140 children between the ages of three and eleven years old. Each child was exposed for three seconds to odors from fish, rose, or a placebo. The children were then immediately shown pictures of the same person with a disgusted face and a happy face and asked to choose one.

=== Food ===
In 2019, Monell published a paper in the journal Physiology & Behavior that included an analysis of about 400,000 food reviews posted on Amazon. Monell scientists concluded that most common complaint about food items is that they were too sweet. They also found that saltiness was almost never mentioned. The researchers suggested that differences in the perception of food tastes were due to genetics. They used "big data" methods to conduct their analysis of the reviews.

=== Publications ===
Monell publishes a quarterly electronic newsletter dedicated to news about the center's activities and the latest information on relevant science.

== Notable members ==
- Amber Alhadeff
- Gary Beauchamp
- Paul Breslin
- Pamela Dalton
- Guillaume de'Lartigue
- Alan Gelperin
- Morley Kare
- Juyun Lim
- Robert Margolskee
- Julie Mennella
- George Preti
- Danielle Reed
- Michael Tordoff
- Henry G. Walter Jr.
- Charles Wysocki
- Kunio Yamazaki
