= Chemesthesis =

Chemical detection of irritants and toxins

Chemesthesis is the detection of potentially harmful chemicals by the skin and mucous membranes. Chemesthetic sensations arise when chemical compounds activate receptors associated with other senses that mediate pain, touch, and thermal perception. These chemical-induced reactions do not fit into the traditional sense categories of taste and smell.

Examples of chemesthetic sensations include the burn-like irritation from capsaicin and related compounds in foods like chili peppers; the coolness of menthol in mouthwashes and topical analgesic creams; the stinging or tingling of carbonated beverages in the nose and mouth; the tear-induction of cut onions; and the pungent, cough-inducing sensation in the back of the throat elicited by the oleocanthal in high-quality extra virgin olive oil. Some of these sensations may be referred to as spiciness, pungency, or piquancy.

Chemesthetic sensations sometimes arise by direct chemical activation of ion channels on sensory nerve fibers, for example of transient receptor potential channels including those of the TRPV, TRPA or TRPM subtypes. Alternatively, irritant chemicals may activate cells of the epithelium to release substances that indirectly activate the nerve fibers. The respiratory passages, including the nose and trachea, possess specialized cells called solitary chemosensory cells which release acetylcholine or other activators to excite nearby nerve fibers.

Because chemoresponsive nerve fibers are present in all types of skin, chemesthetic sensations can be stimulated from anywhere on the body's surface as well as from mucosal surfaces in the nose, mouth, eyes, etc. Mucous membranes are generally more sensitive to chemesthetic stimuli because they lack the barrier function of cornified skin.

Much of the chemesthetic flavor sensations are mediated by the trigeminal nerves, large nerves responsible for motor functions and sensation in the face. Flavors that stimulate the trigeminal nerves are therefore important. For example, the carbon dioxide in carbonated beverages is a trigeminal stimulant.
