= Gary Beauchamp =

American geneticist

Gary K. Beauchamp
- Education: University of Chicago
- Awards: Max Mozell Award, 1999; Sense of Smell Award, 1998; Ig Nobel Prize, 2025
- Scientific career
- Fields: Biology, Genetics
- Workplaces: Monell Chemical Senses Center

Dr. Gary K. Beauchamp is the director and president of the Monell Chemical Senses Center from August 1990 to September 2014.

Dr. Beauchamp graduated from Carleton College in 1965 with a bachelor's degree in biology. He received his Ph.D. in biopsychology in 1971 from The Pritzker School of Medicine of the University of Chicago. He joined the newly established Monell Center as a postdoctoral fellow in 1971, was appointed to the faculty in 1973, and attained the rank of Member in 1981.

Dr. Beauchamp maintains an active research program at Monell, exploring varied topics related to taste, olfaction, and chemesthesis. Trained as a psychobiologist, his research has contributed to advancements in the fields of developmental psychology, physiological psychology, and perception; he also has made important contributions to the fields of genetics, developmental biology, immunobiology, ethology, and molecular biology.

Considered one of the world's leading experts on chemosensory science, Dr. Beauchamp serves as a scientific advisor to numerous governmental and private organizations, including the National Science Foundation, National Institutes of Health, and Institute of Medicine.

During the 2009–2010 academic year, Dr. Beauchamp served on the Institute of Medicine Committee on Strategies to Reduce Sodium Intake in the United States, and after the release of the committee's report, spoke widely about its recommendations.

Dr. Beauchamp was awarded Ig Nobel Prize for "studying what a nursing baby experiences when the baby’s mother eats garlic".

== Select publications ==
- Mennella, JA; Beauchamp, GK (1991). "Maternal diet alters the sensory qualities of human milk and the nursling's behavior". Pediatrics. 88: 737–44. PMID 1896276..
- Beauchamp, G. K.; Mennella, J. A. (2011). "Flavor perception in human infants: development and functional significance". Digestion. 83 (1): 1–6.
- Mennella, J. A.; Lukasewycz, L. D.; Griffith, J. W.; Beauchamp, G. K. (2011). "Evaluation of a forced-choice, paired-comparison tracking procedure method for determining taste preferences across the lifespan". Chemical Senses. 36 (4): 345–55.
- Mennella, J. A.; Lukasewycz, L. D.; Castor, S. M.; Beauchamp, G. K. (2011). "The timing and duration of a sensitive period in human flavor learning: a randomized trial". American Journal of Clinical Nutrition. 93: 1019–24.
- Mennella, J. A.; Ventura, A. K.; Beauchamp, G. K. (2011). "Differential growth patterns among healthy infants fed protein hydrolysate or cow-milk formulas". Pediatrics. 127 (1): 110–18.
- Peyrot; Gachons, C; Beauchamp, G. K.; Stern, R. M.; Koch, K. L.; Breslin, P. A. S. (2011). "Bitter taste induces nausea". Current Biology. 21: R247–R248.
- Peyrot; Gachons, C; Uchida, K.; Bryant, B. P.; Shima, A.; Sperry, J. B.; Dankulich-Nagrudny, L.; Tominaga, M.; Smith, A. B. III; Beauchamp, G. K.; Breslin, P. A. S. (2011). "Unusual pungency from extra-virgin olive oil is attributable to restricted spatial expression of the receptor of oleocanthal". Journal of Neuroscience. 31 (3): 999–1009.
- Field, K. L.; Beauchamp, G. K.; Kimball, B. A.; Mennella, J. A.; Bachmanov, A. A. (2010). "Bitter avoidance in guinea pigs (Cavia porcellus) and mice (Mus musculus and Peromyscus leucopus)". Journal of Comparative Psychology. 124: 455–59.
- Kwak, J.; Willse, A.; Preti, G.; Yamazaki, K.; Beauchamp, G. K. (2010). "In search of the chemical basis for MHC odourtypes". Proceedings of the Royal Society. B277: 2417–25.
- Beauchamp, Gary K. and Linda Bartoshuk. Tasting and smelling. San Diego, Academic Press, c1997.
