= List of Mercy University faculty =

The following is a list of some notable current and former faculty of Mercy University. In 2019, the College of New Rochelle was absorbed into Mercy University.

- Thomas J. Abinanti, American politician, lawyer, and member of the New York State Assembly from Greenburgh, New York.
- Fernando Cabrera, American politician in the Bronx, New York. A Democrat, he currently represents the 14th District in the New York City Council. Formerly program director for the Mental Health and Counseling program at Mercy College
- Hind Rassam Culhane, lawyer, social and behavioral scientist
- Ira Joe Fisher, winner of two regional Emmys
- Emmanuel Gyimah Labi, Ghanaian composer, conductor, and music professor.
- Adma d'Heurle, Distinguished Professor of Psychology, one of five original faculty members of the college
- Matt Kilcullen, Director of Athletics
- Wilbert J. Le Melle, American diplomat, author and academician. Former President of Mercy College
- Joseph Thomas O'Keefe, American prelate of the Roman Catholic Church who served as Bishop of Syracuse from 1987 to 1995.
- Frank Rodriguez, an American former professional baseball pitcher who played in Major League Baseball
- Barbara Boucher Owens, American computer scientist
- Victor M. Pichardo, a Democratic member of the New York State Assembly. Former associate director of Public Relations at Mercy College.
- Alfred S. Posamentier, American author and educator
- Judson Rosebush, director and producer of multimedia products and computer animation, an author, artist and media theorist.
- Arthur Rothstein, recognized as one of America's premier photojournalists.
- Boria Sax, American author and lecturer
- Mark Skousen, American economist and writer.
- Rick Wolff, book editor, author, college coach, broadcaster, and former professional baseball player.
- Daniel Callahan, professor of psychology at Mercy University. Played a leading role in developing the field of biomedical ethics as co-founder of The Hastings Center, the world's first bioethics research institute.
- Donna Gabaccia, an American historian
- Esther Rolick, an American painter
- Nicholas Birns, a scholar of literature, including fantasy and Australian literature
- Herb Boyd, an American journalist, teacher, author, and activist
- Allys Dwyer, an American actress who became a college educator
- Grace F. Edwards, an American author who served as a director of the Harlem Writers Guild
- Katherine Usher Henderson, a college professor and administrator
- Farida Majid, a poet, translator, and academic
- Barbara McManus, an expert in classics and comparative literature, feminism, mythology, and women in antiquity
- Katharine Elizabeth O'Brien, American mathematician, musician and poet
- Mary Dora Rogick, an American zoologist
- James T. Schleifer, an American historian
- Alan Shapiro (education reformer)
- Talitha Washington, an American mathematician
