= Jin Xiaoyu =

Chinese translator

- 金晓宇
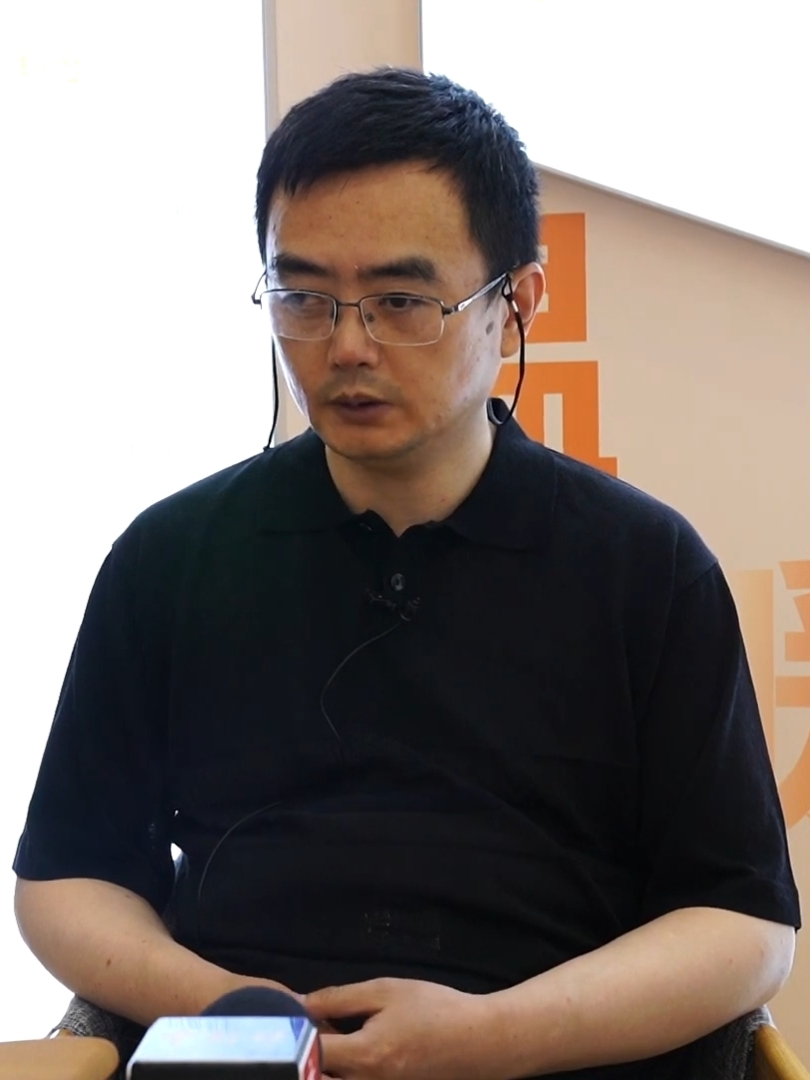
- Jin in 2023
- Born: 1972 (age 53–54); Tianjin, China
- Education: Zhejiang University
- Writing career
- Language: Chinese, English, Japanese, German
- Period: 2010–present
- Genre: Novel

Jin Xiaoyu (simplified Chinese: 金晓宇; traditional Chinese: 金曉宇; pinyin: Jīn Xiǎoyǔ; born 1972) is a Chinese translator best known for translating the works of the American and Japanese literary into Chinese language. His translations are well respected by domestic and over scholars.

== Biography ==
Jin was born in Tianjin, in 1972, to Jin Xingyong (金性勇), and Cao Meizao (曹美藻). He has an elder brother named Jin Xiaotian (金晓天). He has been blind in one eye after an accident and was diagnosed with bipolar disorder at a young age. In 2010, he began translating foreign books into Chinese. Over the past decade, he has translated 22 books from English, Japanese and German and read almost every foreign language novel in Zhejiang Library.

== Translations ==
- Boria Sax (2019-04-01). Crow 乌鸦. Nanjing, Jiangsu: Nanjing University Press. ISBN 9787305212758.
- John Banville (2013-11-01). Mefisto 诱惑者. Nanjing, Jiangsu: Nanjing University Press. ISBN 9787305121982.
- Andrea Barrett (2012-06-01). Ship Fever 船热. Nanjing, Jiangsu: Nanjing University Press. ISBN 9787305096372.
- Robert Byrd (2018-06-01). Elements of Cinema 安德烈·塔可夫斯基：电影的元素. Nanjing, Jiangsu: Nanjing University Press. ISBN 9787305200038.
- Andy Warhol (2019-07-01). The Andy Warhol Diaries 安迪·沃霍尔的日记. Zhengzhou, Henan: Henan University Press. ISBN 9787564931537.
- Greil Marcus (2016-11-01). The History of Rock 'n' Roll in Ten Songs 十首歌里的摇滚史. Zhengzhou, Henan: Henan University Press. ISBN 9787564922870.
- Ann Patchett (2015-11-01). The Best Seat in the House 剧院里最好的座位. Zhengzhou, Henan: Henan University Press. ISBN 9787564920111.
- John Banville (2019-11-20). Time Pieces：A Dublin Memoir 时光碎片. Nanjing, Jiangsu: Nanjing University Press. ISBN 9787305075223.
- David Lodge (2015-05-01). Lives in Writing 写作人生. Zhengzhou, Henan: Henan University Press. ISBN 9787564917883.
- Dan Charnas (2015-06-01). The Big Payback: the History of the Business of Hip-hop 嘻哈这门生意. Zhengzhou, Henan: Henan University Press. ISBN 9787564917845.
- Matsuda Shounan (2018-10-01). A Trip to the Silk Road 丝绸之路纪行. Zhengzhou, Henan: Henan University Press. ISBN 9787564930233.
- Yoko Tawada (2019-01-01). 飞魂. Zhengzhou, Henan: Henan University Press. ISBN 9787564932060.
- Yoko Tawada (2018-03-01). The Bridegroom Was a Dog 狗女婿上门. Zhengzhou, Henan: Henan University Press. ISBN 9787564930523.
- Yoko Tawada (2018-07-01). 和语言漫步日记. Zhengzhou, Henan: Henan University Press. ISBN 9787564931520.
