= Susan L. Parish =

American social worker, researcher and academic administrator

Susan L. Parish is an American social worker, researcher and academic administrator who has served as the 13th president of Mercy University since July 1, 2023. Parish also serves on the boards of the Westchester County Association, Business Council of Westchester, Bronx Economic Development Corporation, and the Commission on Independent Colleges and Universities.

== Education ==
Parish earned her B.A. in English Literature and her M.S.W. from Rutgers University and earned her Ph.D. in Public Health from the University of Illinois at Chicago. She completed a National Institutes of Health-funded postdoctoral fellowship at the Waisman Center, University of Wisconsin-Madison. Her postdoctoral mentors at Wisconsin were Marsha Mailick and Jan Greenberg.

== Career ==
Parish previously served as Dean of the College of Health Professions and Sentara Professor of Health Administration at Virginia Commonwealth University. Under her leadership, the College of Health Professions at Virginia Commonwealth University experienced significant increases in graduate and undergraduate enrollment, and research funding. Additionally, the college launched an innovative liberal arts undergraduate degree in Health Services in 2020 and developed new certificate programs and graduate concentrations.

Prior to joining Virginia Commonwealth University, Parish served as dean of Bouvé College of Health Sciences at Northeastern University, where she developed a Physician Assistant leadership program jointly with the American Academy of Physician Assistants. She was also the inaugural Nancy Lurie Marks Professor of Disability Policy and directed the Lurie Institute for Disability Policy at Brandeis University. She began her academic career as an assistant professor of social work at University of North Carolina at Chapel Hill.

== Research ==
Over the course of her career, Parish has been a prolific researcher primarily investigating the health and well-being of children and adults with disabilities and their caregiving families. She has garnered more than $13 million in external research funding from a range of federal, state and foundation sources. Her work has yielded more than 160 peer-reviewed journal articles.

== Awards and recognitions ==
She has received distinctions for her teaching, mentoring and research, including: “Research Matters!” Distinguished Research Award, Arc of the United States (2009), Advocate Hero, Exceptional Parent Magazine (2021), Lifetime Achievement Award, American Public Health Association Disability Section (2021) and Research Award, American Association on Intellectual and Developmental Disabilities (2019). Parish is a Fellow of the American Association on Intellectual and Developmental Disabilities and she is also a Fellow of the Society of Social Work and Research. She was featured on the list of "The 2023 Westchester 100 The suburban county’s most influential leaders."
