= Mercy University =

Private university in Dobbs Ferry, New York, US

Coordinates: 41.022108°N 73.874576°W

- Former name: Mercy College
- Motto: Latin: Inserviendo consumere
- Motto in English: To be consumed in service
- Type: Private research university
- Established: 1950; 76 years ago
- Founder: Sisters of Mercy
- Accreditation: MSCHE
- Religious affiliation: Nonsectarian, historic ties with the Sisters of Mercy
- Academic affiliations: NAICU; CIC
- Endowment: $368.5 million (2025)
- President: Susan L. Parish
- Provost: Kristin Curry Greenwood
- Faculty: 227 full-time, 667 part-time (2023)
- Students: 8,992 (fall 2024)
- Undergraduates: 6,775 (fall 2024)
- Postgraduates: 2,217 (fall 2024)
- Location: Dobbs Ferry, New York, United States
- Campus: Suburban, 66 acres (0.27 km^{2}) (Dobbs Ferry campus)
- Newspaper: The Impact
- Colors: Blue and White
- Nickname: Mavericks
- Sporting affiliations: NCAA Division II – ECC
- Mascot: Maverick or Mav
- Website: mercy.edu
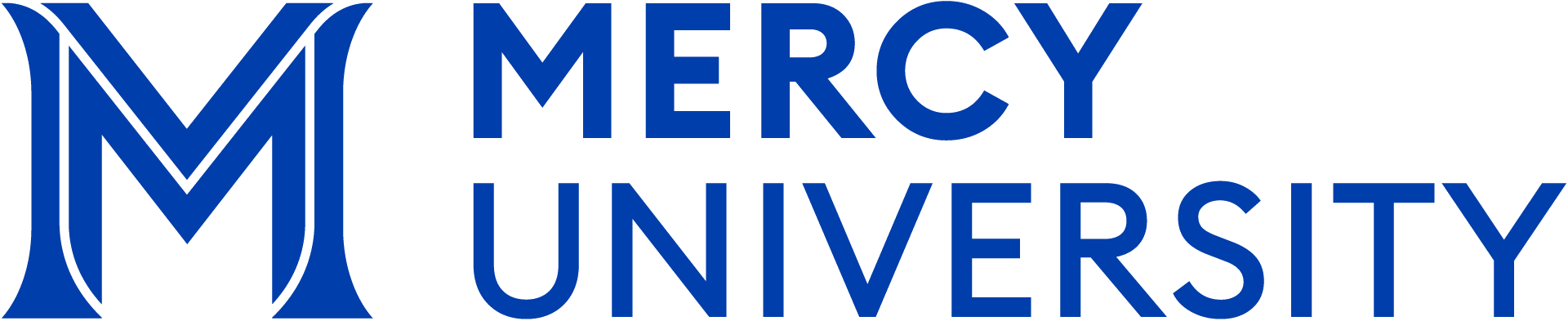

Mercy University (Mercy NY), previously known as Mercy College, is a private research university in Dobbs Ferry, New York, United States, with additional locations in Manhattan and the Bronx. It is a federally-designated minority-serving institution and the largest private Hispanic-Serving Institution in the state of New York. The university was historically affiliated with the Catholic Church, but has been independent and non-sectarian since the early 1970s, though it retains its historical affiliation with the Sisters of Mercy.

The university has six schools and offers more than 100 undergraduate and graduate degree and certificate programs, on campus and online. Mercy University's 2025 Carnegie Classification has been designated as a Professions-focused Undergraduate/Graduate-Doctorate Medium. Enrollment at Mercy University includes approximately 9,000 undergraduate and graduate students representing 42 states and 59 countries throughout Asia, Europe and Latin America.

== History ==
The college was founded in 1950 by the Sisters of Mercy. Mercy became a four-year institution offering programs leading to the baccalaureate degree in 1961. Mercy first received accreditation from the Middle States Commission on Higher Education by the end of that decade. Over the next half-decade, Mercy became independent, non-sectarian, and co-educational; it also doubled the size of the existing physical plant.

In 2011, Mercy College absorbed the buildings and facilities of Our Lady of Victory Academy. The purchase and redevelopment of Victory Hall in 2013 allowed Mercy to increase classroom space, particularly for experiential learning in Business, Health Sciences, Music Production and Recording Arts, and Design and Animation. In 2016, Mercy College opened a new $32 million, 100,000-square-foot residence hall, a 5,000-square-foot fitness center and a Starbucks Cafe and convenience store on its Dobbs Ferry campus. Mercy College expanded and renovated its Manhattan campus in 2019. Also in 2019, Mercy College absorbed the College of New Rochelle. In 2023, Mercy College launched its sixth school, the School of Nursing, and became Mercy University to reflect the breadth of its programs across a wide variety of disciplines at the undergraduate and graduate levels and its evolution to a research university. In 2024, Mercy University completed $4.25 million worth of campus improvements in Dobbs Ferry, New York, including the construction of a 4,100 square-foot permanent open-aired pavilion in The Grove area of the Dobbs Ferry main campus. Also in 2024, Mercy University started enhancing its athletic fields on the Dobbs Ferry campus.

A new 26,140-square-foot field house is slated for completion in mid-2027 on the Dobbs Ferry campus.

== Campuses ==
=== Dobbs Ferry main campus ===
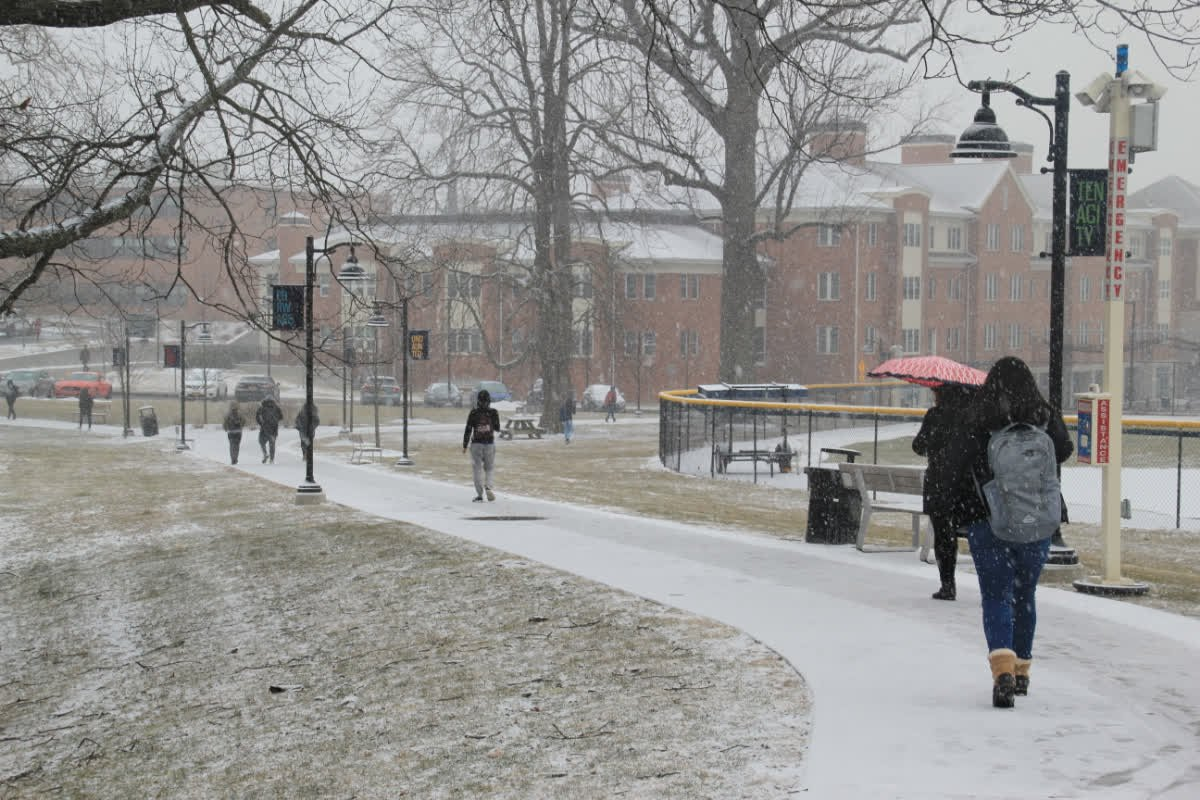
Mercy University Dobbs Ferry campus

Mercy University's Dobbs Ferry, New York, campus is seated on 66 acres (27 ha). It encompasses numerous administrative, academic and dormitory buildings, as well as indoor and outdoor athletic and fitness facilities.

In 2024, Mercy University completed $4.25 million worth of campus improvements in Dobbs Ferry, New York, including the construction of a 4,100 square-foot permanent open-aired pavilion in The Grove area of the Dobbs Ferry main campus.

In 2024, Mercy University started enhancing its athletic fields on the Dobbs Ferry campus.

=== Manhattan ===
The Manhattan campus is situated in the heart of Manhattan at Herald Square and occupies three floors at 47 West 34th Street totalling 95,370 square feet. The Manhattan campus was expanded and renovated in 2019.

=== Bronx ===
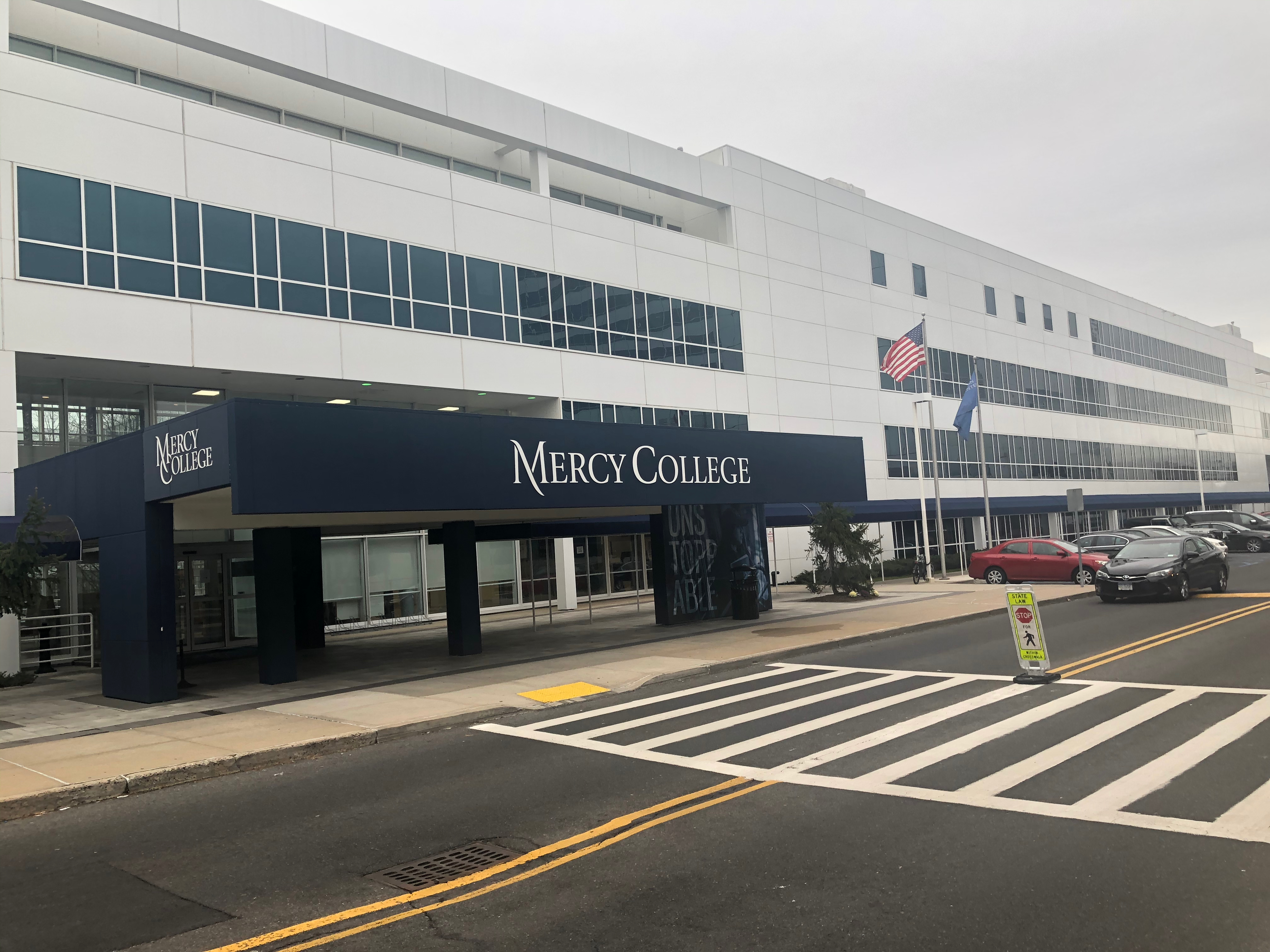
Mercy University Bronx campus

The Bronx campus occupies 125,522 square feet (11,661.4 m^{2}) at the Hutchinson Metro Center, a rapidly developing complex of corporate and health care organizations and businesses. Bronx (2019) campuses with cutting-edge technology and dedicated

wings to support learning in the health professions.The Bronx Campus's facilities include health and science labs and anatomage tables and student spaces such as the Veterans Lounge.

=== Former locations ===
==== Yorktown Heights ====
In 1979, the Yorktown campus of Mercy College moved to a permanent facility at the intersection of Route 202 and Strang Boulevard. This landscaped building was renovated for college use. The branch library at the Yorktown campus was designated a federal depository for government publications. The campus was close to Franklin Delano Roosevelt State Park and ceased operations in 2021.

==== College of New Rochelle campus lease ====
In fall 2019, Mercy leased the College of New Rochelle's main campus in New Rochelle for up to two years, at $1.8 million a year, and nearly 1,700 students from CNR became Mercy students. In addition to CNR's main campus, Mercy also negotiated leases for two of CNR's satellite campuses, Rosa Parks in Harlem and the Brooklyn Campus in the Bedford-Stuyvesant section of Brooklyn. However this arrangement proved short-lived as the New Rochelle campus was sold in December 2019 to the Grand Lodge of New York Freemasons in order to pay off the College of New Rochelle's debts.

== Academics ==
=== Schools ===
Mercy University has six schools:

- School of Business
- School of Education
- School of Health & Natural Sciences
- School of Liberal Arts
- School of Nursing
- School of Social & Behavioral Sciences

The university offers more than 100 undergraduate and graduate degree and certificate programs, including more than two dozen that can be completed online. The faculty comprises 227 full-time professors.

=== Reputation and rankings ===
Academic rankings

National
- U.S. News & World Report: 332 of 428

- 68th in Top Performers on Social Mobility in National Universities category by U.S. News & World Report.
- 332nd of 428 in National Universities category by U.S. News & World Report.

=== Admissions ===
Undergraduate acceptance rate was 85% in Fall 2023. The middle 50 percent SAT Composite scores of enrolled students were 1020–1230. The middle 50 percent ACT Composite score of enrolled students was between 21 and 25. The average high-school GPA of enrolled students was 3.4 on a 4.0 scale.

=== Demographics ===
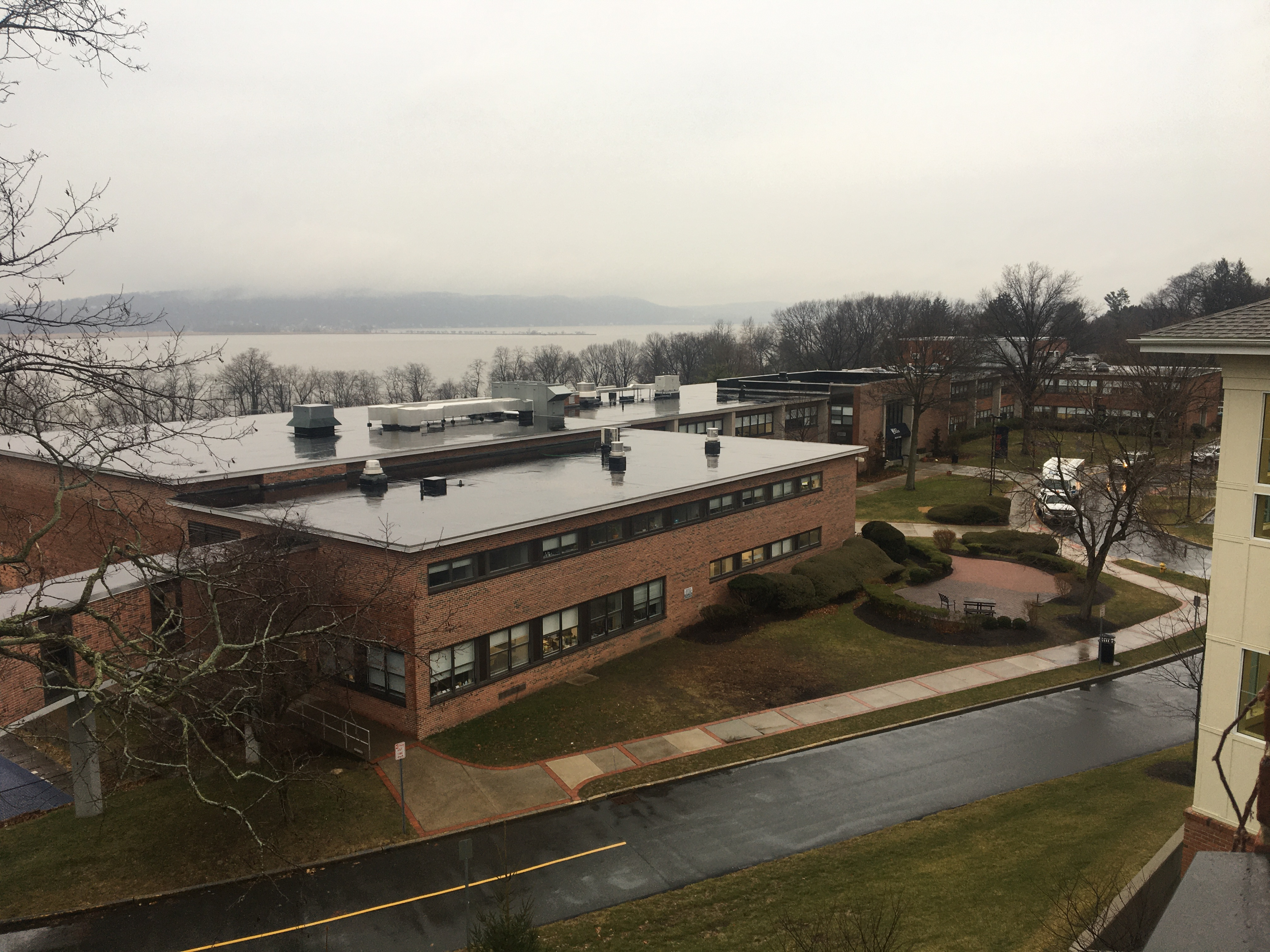
Main Hall

As of 2022, Mercy University had 8,615 students enrolled. The undergraduate population includes 4,815 full-time and 1,564 part-time students with 30 percent of freshmen and 11 percent of all full-time undergraduates residing in campus-affiliated housing. While the majority of students are come from the tri-state area, students represent 40 states and 51 countries. Mercy University offers small class sizes with an average student/faculty ratio of 15:1. Around 89 percent of students are commuters; 11 percent live in campus housing. Mercy University has 72 percent female students and 28 percent male students.

=== Accreditation ===
All campuses of Mercy University are accredited by the Middle States Commission on Higher Education.

=== Research ===
Mercy University participates in the McNair Scholars Program and is a member of the Council on Undergraduate Research. The Office of Sponsored Programs works with faculty members and students to apply for funding to support research programs in a variety of fields. Mercy University conducts cybersecurity research in a number of areas including cross-domain information sharing, data security and privacy, data mining for malware detection, geospatial information security, secure social networks, and secure cloud computing. The university is designated a National Center of Academic Excellence (CAE) in Cyber Defense Education by the National Security Agency and the Department of Homeland Security.

== Libraries ==
Mercy University's flagship library is on the main Dobbs Ferry Campus. Both the Bronx and Manhattan campuses also have branch libraries. The branch library at Mercy University's now permanently closed Yorktown campus, which was merged into the flagship library on the main Dobbs Ferry Campus, had been designated a federal depository for government publications.

== Athletics ==
Mercy athletic teams are the Mavericks. The college is a member of the Division II level of the National Collegiate Athletic Association (NCAA), primarily competing in the East Coast Conference (ECC; formerly known as the New York Collegiate Athletic Conference (NYCAC) until after the 2005–06 academic year) since the 1989–90 academic year.

Mercy University sponsors an intramural sports program, as well as intercollegiate competition in 11 varsity sports: Men's sports include baseball, basketball, lacrosse, soccer and volleyball; while women's sports include basketball, field hockey, lacrosse, soccer, softball and volleyball.

The baseball, lacrosse, soccer, and field hockey teams, in addition to numerous local community high school and youth groups, play on a new, eco-friendly turf field on the Dobbs Ferry campus.

=== Nickname ===
In 2007, the university changed its athletic nickname from "Flyers" to "Mavericks" after the administration reviewed suggestions from students and faculty members.

== Student life ==
=== Student government ===
The Mercy College Student Government Association (SGA) is responsible for protecting students' rights, advocating for students' interests, and promoting student life.

=== ROTC ===
Mercy University has U.S. Army ROTC and U.S. Navy ROTC programs on campus.

== Notable people ==
=== Presidents ===
- Donald Grunewald (1972–1984); Merle King (1984–1985; interim)
- Wilbert J. LeMelle (1985–1990)
- Jay Sexter (1990–1999)
- Lucie Lapovsky (1999–2004)
- Louise Feroe (2004–2008)
- Kimberly Cline (2008–2013)
- Timothy Hall (2014–2023)
- Susan L. Parish (2023–present)

=== Notable faculty and staff ===
- Thomas J. Abinanti, American politician, lawyer, and member of the New York State Assembly from Greenburgh, New York.
- Fernando Cabrera, American politician in the Bronx, New York. A Democrat, he currently represents the 14th District in the New York City Council. Formerly program director for the Mental Health and Counseling program at Mercy College
- Hind Rassam Culhane, lawyer, social and behavioral scientist
- Ira Joe Fisher, winner of two regional Emmys
- Emmanuel Gyimah Labi, Ghanaian composer, conductor, and music professor.
- Adma d'Heurle, Distinguished Professor of Psychology, one of five original faculty members of the college
- Matt Kilcullen, Director of Athletics
- Wilbert J. Le Melle, American diplomat, author and academician. Former President of Mercy College
- Joseph Thomas O'Keefe, American prelate of the Roman Catholic Church who served as Bishop of Syracuse from 1987 to 1995.
- Frank Rodriguez, an American former professional baseball pitcher who played in Major League Baseball
- Barbara Boucher Owens, American computer scientist
- Victor M. Pichardo, a Democratic member of the New York State Assembly. Former associate director of Public Relations at Mercy College.
- Alfred S. Posamentier, American author and educator
- Judson Rosebush, director and producer of multimedia products and computer animation, an author, artist and media theorist.
- Arthur Rothstein, recognized as one of America's premier photojournalists.
- Boria Sax, American author and lecturer
- Mark Skousen, American economist and writer.
- Rick Wolff, book editor, author, college coach, broadcaster, and former professional baseball player.
- Daniel Callahan, professor of psychology at Mercy University. Played a leading role in developing the field of biomedical ethics as co-founder of The Hastings Center, the world's first bioethics research institute.
- Donna Gabaccia, an American historian
- Esther Rolick, an American painter

=== Notable alumni ===
Mercy University had more than 100,000 alumni as of 2026. The alumni of the now-defunct College of New Rochelle have been merged into the Mercy University alumni community.

Alumni in politics and government include Jamaal Bowman, American politician and educator serving as the U.S. representative for New York's 16th congressional district since 2021; Pasquale J. D'Amuro, American terrorism authority, former intelligence agent and television analyst. In a career of 26 years he rose to the third position of the FBI; Robert Cornegy, New York City Council Member for the 36th District, representing Bedford-Stuyvesant and northern Crown Heights in Brooklyn; Mike Kavekotora, Namibian politician and member of parliament. He is the president of the Rally for Democracy and Progress (RDP); David Rosado, American politician from New York; Maria del Carmen Arroyo, the former Council member for the 17th district of the New York City Council; Anna Cowin, former Lake County School District superintendent and served in the Florida State Senate; Mary Donohue, an American retired educator, attorney, politician and Judge of the New York Court of Claims and a former two-term Lieutenant Governor of New York.

Prominent alumni in business and finance include Mark Zuckerberg, self-made billionaire, chairman, chief executive officer, and co-founder of Facebook; (Note: He attended at least one graduate course at the university.) Carolyn Kepcher, businesswoman who was one of the judges on the NBC television program The Apprentice; Walter Anderson, former publisher and CEO of Parade Magazine; Noreen Culhane, an American businesswoman and current executive vice president of the New York Stock Exchange; and Anne Sweeney, former co-chair of Disney Media Networks and President of the Disney–ABC Television Group, and the President of Disney Channel from 1996 to 2014.

Alumni in the arts and media include Gabourey Sidibe, Academy Award-nominated actress; Mercedes Ruehl, American actress. She is the recipient of several accolades, including an Academy Award, a Golden Globe Award and a Tony Award; Angela Cascarano, Emmy award–winning TV news producer; Maria Mercader, an American journalist and news producer who won a business Emmy Award; Joan Wolf, author of more than 15 historical novels; and Camille Marchetta, novelist, television writer and producer best known for her work on 1980s prime time soap operas Dallas, Dynasty and Falcon Crest.

Notable figures in the field of education include Paul Broadie, president of Housatonic Community College and Gateway Community College; Gregory Howard Williams, 27th President of the University of Cincinnati, and the 11th President of the City College of New York; Meisha Ross Porter, an American educator who served as the New York City Schools Chancellor; Anthony Mullen, 2009 National Teacher of the Year award winner; Madeleine Blais, an American journalist, author and professor at the University of Massachusetts Amherst; Julia Ching, professor of religion, philosophy and East Asian studies at the University of Toronto; Regina Peruggi, an American educator, who was the President of Kingsborough Community College from 2005 to 2014. Prior to that, she was president of Marymount Manhattan College and led the Central Park Conservancy; Teresa P. Pica, Professor of Education at the University of Pennsylvania Graduate School of Education; Darlene Yee-Melichar, professor and coordinator of the gerontology program at San Francisco State University where she also serves as Director of Long-Term care Administration; Ada Maria Isasi-Diaz, Cuban-American theologian who served as professor emerita of ethics and theology at Drew University in Madison, New Jersey; and Rev. Dr. Victor Aloyo, President of Columbia Theological Seminary.

Alumni in science and medicine include Paule Valery Joseph, an American nurse and researcher at the National Institute on Alcohol Abuse and Alcoholism. She is the 2022 National Academy of Medicine and American Academy of Nursing Fellow; Emmeline Edwards, neurochemist serving as director of the division of extramural research at the National Center for Complementary and Integrative Health. She previously researched the neural mechanisms of complex behaviors and characterization of a genetic model of affective disorders at the University of Maryland, College Park. From 2000 to 2010, Edwards was deputy director of the extramural program at the National Institute of Neurological Disorders and Stroke; and Kathleen Ethier, American social psychologist and public health official with the Centers for Disease Control and Prevention (CDC). In 2016, she was appointed the Director of CDC's Division of Adolescent and School Health in the National Center for HIV/AIDS, Viral Hepatitis, STD, and TB Prevention.

== See also ==
- BronxNet
