= Adma d'Heurle =

American psychologist (1924–2019)

Adma Jeha d'Heurle
- Born: June 21, 1924; Bishmizzine, Lebanon
- Died: October 19, 2019 (aged 95); Ossining, New York
- Education: American University of Beirut; Smith College; University of Chicago
- Occupation: Psychologist
- Spouse: François d'Heurle
- Children: Three

Adma Jeha d'Heurle (June 21, 1924 - October 19, 2019) was an American psychologist, Distinguished Professor of Psychology at Mercy College in Dobbs Ferry, New York. where she was an advocate for social justice and peace issues, as well as ethics within the social sciences curriculum.

== Biography ==
d'Heurle was born in Bishmizzine, Lebanon and graduated from the American University of Beirut in 1947. She then came to the United States and received her master's degree in 1948 Smith College in Northampton, Massachusetts, and a Ph.D. in psychology in 1953 from the University of Chicago. d'Heurle was married to François d'Heurle, with whom she had three children. She died on October 19, 2019, in Ossining, New York.

== Career ==
d'Heurle taught briefly at Saint Xavier College (Chicago). from 1954 to 1958. In 1961, shortly after moving to Westchester County, New York, she became one of five original faculty members of the newly founded Mercy College (Dobbs Ferry, New York). In 2002, she was named Distinguished Professor. Her career also included administrative positions at Mercy College (Chairwoman of the Department of Psychology, Department of Education, and Division of Behavioral and Social Sciences) and service as evaluator for nearly three decades for the Middle States Association of Colleges and Secondary Schools—Commission on Higher Education. In addition, d'Heurle served as adjunct professor at Long Island University, Lecturer in Social Thought at Stanford University, Fulbright Scholar at Uppsala Universitet (Sweden), Visiting Scholar in the Humanities at New York University, and Fulbright Scholar at the University of Turku (Turun Yliopisto, in Finland).

She also served as editor of Cross Currents—an ecumenical journal of religious studies—and regular contributor of book reviews to World Literature Today. d'Heurle's research represented a gradual broadening from the child, to the couple, family, community, and societies around the world. Her scholarship ranged over the diaries of Anaïs Nin and Simone de Beauvoir; films of Ingmar Bergman; novels of D. H. Lawrence; dramas of Henrik Ibsen; fairy tales and folktales of Europe, Japan, Africa and the Middle East; and schoolbooks and educational systems of various countries.

== List of Publications ==
=== Books ===
- Gross, Ira, John Downing, and Adma D'heurle. Sex Role Attitudes and Cultural Change. Dordrecht: Springer Netherlands, 1982. ISBN 9789400977372 [https://doi.org/10.1007/978-94-009-7737-2].

=== Solo ===
- d'Heurle, Adma (1958), "Some Observations on the Evening College", The Journal of Higher Education, 29 (5), 261-266+291-292. doi:10.2307/1978951
- d'Heurle, Adma (1979), "Play and the Development of the Person", The Elementary School Journal, 79 (4), 224–234. doi:10.1086/461152
- d'Heurle, Adma (1983), "The Image of the Child in Popular American Films", ETC: A Review of General Semantics, 40 (1), 41–52.
- d'Heurle, Adma (1983), "The Image of Woman in the Fiction of Birgitta Trotzig", Scandinavian Studies, 55 (4), 371–382.
- d'Heurle, Adma (1987), "The Role of Psychology in the Development of the Theories and Strategies of Peace", Peace Research, 19 (3), 1–12.
- d'Heurle, Adma (1992), "Vampire and Child Savior Motifs in the Tales of Isak Dinesen", 283–292, in Kaj Björkqvist and Pirkko Niemelä (eds.), Of Mice and Women: Aspects of Female Aggression, Academic Press. ISBN 9780121025908; doi:10.1016/B978-0-12-102590-8.50031-3
- d'Heurle, Adma (1998), "Language and the Culture of Peace", The Acorn: Journal of the Gandhi-King Society, 9 (2), 33–42. doi:10.5840/acorn1998924

=== Collaborative ===
- d'Heurle, Adma; Alice, Mary (1957), "New Ventures in School Organization-The Ungraded School and Use of Teacher Aides", The Elementary School Journal, 57 (5), 268–271. doi:10.1086/459547
- d'Heurle, Adma; Mellinger, Jeanne Cummins; Haggard, Ernest A. (1959), "Personality, Intellectual, and Achievement Patterns in Gifted Children" Psychological Monographs: General and Applied, 73 (13) (Whole No. 483).
- d'Heurle, Adma; Feimer, Joel N. (1971), "On Play," The Elementary School Journal, 72 (3), 118–124. doi:10.1086/460685
- d'Heurle, Adma; Feimer, Joel N.; Kraetzer, Mary C. (1972), "The Sugar-Coated World of the Third Grade Reader," The Elementary School Journal, 72 (7), 362–71. doi:10.1086/460715
- d'Heurle, Adma; Feimer, Joel N.; Kraetzer, Mary C. (1974), "Tricksters and Non-Heroes: A Study of the World View of the African Folktale", The Conch: A Sociological Journal of African Cultures and Literature, 6 (1-2), 99–119.
- d'Heurle, Adma; Feimer, Joel N.; Kraetzer, Mary C. (1975), "World View of Folktales: A Comparative Study", The Elementary School Journal, 76 (2), 75–89. doi:10.1086/460958
- d'Heurle, Adma; Feimer, Joel N. (1976), "Lost Children: The Role of the Children in the Psychological Plays of Henrik Ibsen", in Psychoanalytic Review, 63 (1), 27–47.
- d'Heurle, Adma; Feimer, Joel N. (1979), "The Tender Connection", in The Antioch Review, 37 (3), 293–310. doi:10.2307/46381k93
- d'Heurle, Adma; Cohen, Jeffrey; Petersson, Viveka Widmark (1980), "Cross-sex Friendship in Children: Gender Patterns and Cultural Perspectives", Psychology in the Schools, 17 (4), 523–29. doi:10.1002/1520-6807(198010)17:4<523::AID-PITS2310170418>3.0.CO;2-5
- d'Heurle, Adma; Hyönä, Jukka; Destefano, Charles; Hujanen, Heli; Lindeman, Johanna; Poskiparta, Elisa; Niemi, Pekka (1995), "Primers as Socializing Agents in American and Finnish Schools", Comparative Education Review, 39 (3), 280–298. doi:10.1086/447324
- d'Heurle, Adma; Gross, Ira; Downing, John (eds.) (1982), Sex Role Attitudes and Cultural Change, Dordrecht, Holland: D. Reidel Publishing Co. ISBN 9789400977372
