= Walter Anderson (editor) =

American magazine editor

- Born: August 31, 1944 (age 82)
- Education: Mercy College (New York)
- Occupations: Magazine editor, Author, Playwright
- Known for: Chairman and CEO of Parade Publications, editor of Parade magazine
- Notable work: Meant to Be, The Confidence Course, Almost Home
- Awards: Horatio Alger Award, Literacy Volunteers of America's Stars in Literacy Award

Walter Anderson (born August 31, 1944) was the chairman and CEO of Parade Publications (2000–2009) and he was the editor of Parade magazine for 20 years before being named CEO.

== Early life and education ==
Anderson dropped out of high school and enlisted in the United States Marine Corps where he served from 1961 to 1966, rising to the rank of sergeant and serving in Vietnam (1965). During his enlistment he earned his General Educational Development (GED) diploma and has been a national spokesman for the GED program. After his discharge from the Marines, he received an AA in liberal arts and social science from Westchester Community College (1970) and a BS in Psychology from Mercy College (1972) in Westchester, New York. He was valedictorian of both colleges and served as chairman of the Board of Trustees at Mercy College for eight years and is now Trustee Emeritus.

== Career ==
An author and playwright, Anderson is also co-founder of Novium Learning, an educational services company in Wellesley, Massachusetts. He worked for 32 years at Parade Publications where he held the positions of chairman and CEO and editor-in-chief. During his tenure, Anderson, who himself was America's Storyteller on FNN, helped increase the circulation of Parade Magazine by more than 50% to 37 million, the world's largest. He brought in acclaimed writers such as Norman Mailer, Carl Sagan, Elie Wiesel, Julia Child and Gail Sheehy, and transformed and modernized the magazine with new columns and a higher level of reporting and writing.

Prior to joining Parade in 1977, Anderson held several senior newspaper management positions with Gannett Publications in Westchester, New York. He also was an investigative reporter whose articles appeared in New York Magazine and the Associated Press. He was named by Marjabelle Young Stewart to the list of the ten most well-mannered Americans.

As a champion of literacy, Anderson made his theatrical debut in 1992 at Ford's Theater in Washington, DC where he created and presented an original program in storytelling to benefit the Literacy Volunteers of America and the National Center for Family Literacy. He has written five books including the bestsellers "Meant To Be," a memoir, and "The Confidence Course." His first play, "Almost Home," was produced (2014) at the Acorn Theatre (NYC) by The Directors Company. His most recent play, "The Trial of Donna Caine,' premiered (2018) at the George Street Playhouse (NJ). His filmed series, "It's About Time," is permanently available at the Library of Congress. He has appeared on numerous television and radio shows.

He was appointed by President Clinton in 1995 to serve for a four-year period as a member of the U.S. National Commission on Libraries and Information Science. He has also served as a board member of the National Center for Family Literacy, Very Special Arts and PBS. He was awarded the Literacy Volunteers of America's Stars in Literacy Award, the Napoleon Hill Gold Medal for literary achievement, the Tree of Life Award from The Jewish National Fund (presented by Elie Wiesel), the John H. Russell Leadership Award from the Marine Corps University Foundation, the Marine For Life Award (presented by Gen. James Jones, USMC, the Supreme Allied Commander in Europe) and the Horatio Alger Award, for which he was nominated by the late Norman Vincent Peale.

He has been an adjunct professor or visiting lecturer at several colleges, including the University of the Pacific, Clemson University and the New School for Social Research in New York. He was appointed by Secretary of the Navy Jim Webb in November 1987 to the board of advisors of the U.S. Naval Postgraduate School and he served as an advisor until January, 2019. He also served as Chairman of the Board of Trustees at Mercy College, his alma mater, for eight years and is now Trustee Emeritus there.

== Additional sources ==
- "Walter Anderson, Chairman and CEO". Parade Bios. Parade Publishing. Archived from the original on May 10, 2007.
