= Digital Effects (studio) =

Computer animation studio

Digital Effects Inc.
- Industry: Computer animation
- Founded: 1978; 48 years ago
- Founder: Jeff Kleiser; Judson Rosebush
- Defunct: 1986; 40 years ago
- Headquarters: New York City

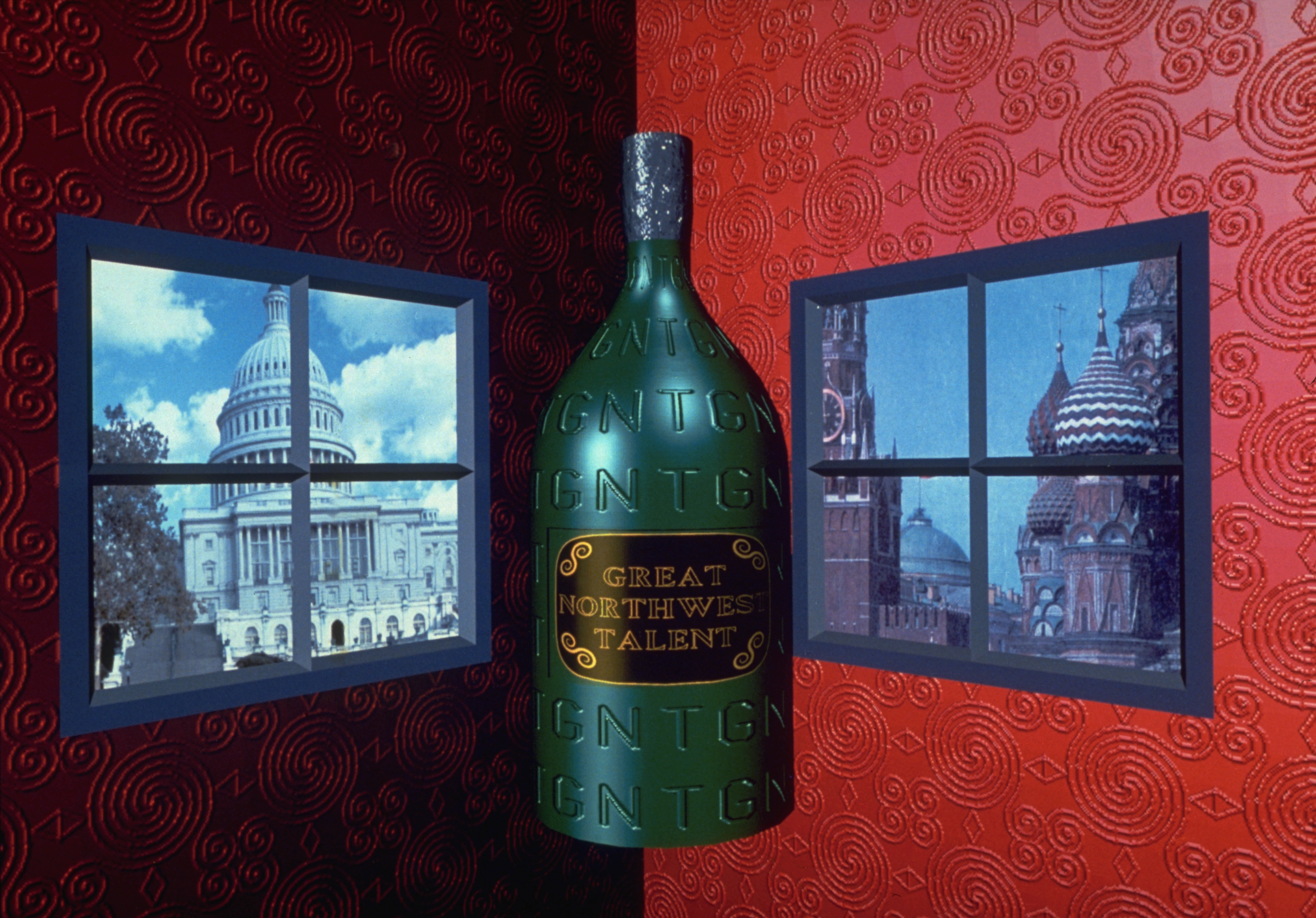
A three-dimensional computer graphics image by Digital Effects Inc., New York, circa 1982. This image is one of the company's first to combine three dimensional objects (the bottle) along with texture mapping (the surface of the bottle and the "wallpaper" on the walls) and image mapping (the label on the bottle and the images inside the windows. The image was created using Digital Effects' Vision software, written in APL and Fortran.

Digital Effects Inc. was an early and innovative computer animation studio at 321 West 44th Street in New York City. It was the first computer graphics house in New York City when it opened in 1978, and operated until 1986. It was founded by Judson Rosebush, Jeff Kleiser, Don Leich, David Cox, Bob Hoffman, Jan Prins, and others. Many of the original group came from Syracuse University, where Rosebush taught computer graphics. Rosebush developed the animation software APL Visions and FORTRAN Visions. Kleiser later went on to found Kleiser-Walczak Construction Company, which experimented with creating synthespians and made the animation for Monsters of Grace.

The company's original animation system consisted of a Tektronix display with a 1200 baud modem connection to a remote Amdahl V6 in Bethesda, Maryland, with rendering done on an IBM System 370, recording on an Information International Inc. (III) film recorder in Los Angeles, and final processing and optical printing completed back in New York. The V6 ran APL, and could render at a rate of one polygon per second. The company later built one of the first frame buffers and video paint systems (the Video Palette), acquired a Harris mini-mainframe computer, and a Dicomed 35mm color film recorder.

Digital Effects was one of the first companies in the world to produce "flying logos" for television and advertising, but they aggressively and rapidly expanded their capabilities to include motion capture, form morphing, raster effects, and so forth. Among their early works were historic animated sequences of Times Square, commercials for Scientific American, and a set of MTV-style demonstration reels. But they are perhaps best remembered for their contribution to the 2D computer animation in the 1982 film Tron — among other things, they were responsible for creating the main title, and for the animation of the Bit, including one that accompanies Kevin Flynn in his reconstructed Recognizer.

The name of the company has entered the popular language as a noun which refers to visual effects which are both synthetic as well as image-altering and which occur in the realm of both 2D and 3D graphics and animation. Besides pure 3D computer modeling and animation, digital effects include scene-to-scene transition devices, deformations such as morphing, and color manipulation.
