= Saville Sax =

American spy (1924–1980)

- Born: July 26, 1924; New York City, US
- Died: September 25, 1980 (aged 56); Edwardsville, Illinois, US
- Education: Harvard College
- Children: Boria Sax, Sarah Sax, Joshua Sax

Saville Sax (July 26, 1924 – September 25, 1980) was the Harvard College roommate of Theodore Hall, who recruited Hall for the Soviets and acted as a courier to move the atomic secrets from Los Alamos to the Soviets.

== Biography ==
Saville Sax was born in New York City on July 26, 1924, and went by the name of Savvy Sax. He was the son of Bernard Sax (1896–1936) and Bluma Sax (1895–1986). Bluma and Bernard were both born in Russia, of Jewish ancestry. In 1930 they were living in Manhattan with their grandfather Jacob M. Sax (1874–?/1867-1947) and his wife Bessy (Elisabeth). Saville was introduced to Soviet agents by his mother, Bluma, who worked for a Communist front organization called Russian War Relief. Sax went by the cover name "Oldster", and periodically traveled to New Mexico to collect information from Hall.

Saville had a son, Boria Sax, a daughter, Sarah Sax, and a sister, Anne Saville Arenberg (1925-1967).

After drifting from job to job, Saville ended up teaching "values clarification" in a Great Society funded education program called NEXTEP, when he was "something of an adult hippie, disheveled in his personal habits and given to LSD and other hallucinogenic drugs" and "openly boasted of his role in the [atomic] spying". He died on September 25, 1980, in Edwardsville, Illinois. He was survived by his wife and three children.
