= Rick Wolff (writer) =

American broadcaster (1951–2023)

Rick Wolff (July 14, 1951 – April 10, 2023) was an American book editor, author, college coach, broadcaster, and onetime professional baseball player. He was the son of Hall of Fame Sportscaster Bob Wolff. He was Senior Executive Editor at Large with Kevin Anderson and Associates and hosted "The Sports Edge" on WFAN Sports Radio.

== Playing career ==
Wolff was drafted after his junior year at Harvard as a second baseman by the Detroit Tigers in the 33rd round of the 1972 amateur draft. A top athlete at Edgemont High School (Scarsdale, NY) where he set numerous records in football and baseball, Wolff was an Atlantic Collegiate Baseball League All-Star and, as a sophomore, played in the College World Series in Omaha, Nebraska.

After signing with the Tigers, Wolff played for the Anderson Tigers in the Western Carolinas League, where he hit .246 with one home run and 26 runs batted in. The following year, Wolff played for the Clinton Pilots in the Midwest League. He hit .229 with one home run and 25 RBI.

== Coaching career ==
Wolff served as an assistant baseball coach at Pace University (Pleasantville, NY) in 1977. From there, he was hired to be the head baseball coach at Mercy College (Dobbs Ferry, NY), and was there from 1978 to 1985. By the end of his tenure, the Flyers were nationally ranked in NCAA Div. II, and several of Wolff's players went on to professional careers. Wolff was inducted into the Mercy College Sports Hall of Fame in 2005.

In 1986–1988, Wolff worked for ESPN, doing color commentary on college baseball games, including the 1986 College World Series. He also worked for the MSG Network covering Big East baseball.

In 1989, Wolff was hired to serve as a roving sport psychology coach by the Cleveland Indians. He was on their staff for five years, and was awarded a championship ring when the Indians won the American League pennant in 1995.

== After baseball ==
Wolff pursued his writing and editorial career soon after stepping down as an active player. He has written numerous books on a variety of subjects, and hundreds of magazine articles. His byline has routinely appeared in The New York Times, the Harvard Business Review, Harvard Magazine, Sports Illustrated, Sport, USA TODAY, Publishers Weekly, Psychology Today, and many more.

Perhaps his most read magazine article ran in Sports Illustrated when, at the age of 38, Wolff returned to the minor leagues as an active player for the South Bend White Sox (Midwest League). Over three games, he went 4-for-7 with 3 RBI and a double. His .571 average was the highest among all players in the White Sox organization that year, and Wolff was awarded a championship ring as the South Bend won the league title that season.

Building off his interest in the field of sport psychology, Wolff has become an expert on sports parenting issues. He was the co-founder of the Center for Sports Parenting (2005–2011), and has hosted The Sports Edge, a show dedicated to sports parenting issues, on WFAN Radio in New York City since 1998.

Wolff was also a co-founder of the Peekskill Robins baseball team (Atlantic Collegiate Baseball League) in 2002.

== Publishing career ==
Rick Wolff has edited and published for a number of bestselling authors in a variety of genres. In 2021, Wolff joined Kevin Anderson and Associates, where he served as Senior Executive Editor at Large. Before joining Kevin Anderson and Associates, Wolf served as Senior Executive Editor of a new business book imprint at Houghton Mifflin Harcourt. Prior to landing at HMH, he was a vice president, Executive Editor of Grand Central Publishing which is part of Hachette Book Group USA. He joined this house in 1993, after being at Macmillan/Collier for eight years as a senior editor.

In 2001, Wolff founded the Warner Business Book imprint. Since its inception, Warner Business (now known as Business Plus) has posted close to four dozen bestselling titles on the New York Times, Wall Street Journal, and Business Week bestseller lists.

A few of Wolff's bestselling authors include former General Electric CEO Jack Welch (JACK: Straight from the Gut, which was on the New York Times Nonfiction Bestseller list for six months); personal finance guru Robert Kiyosaki (Rich Dad Poor Dad, which was on the New York Times Bestseller list for close to seven years); famed golfer Tiger Woods (How I Play Golf); former Secretary of the Treasury Hank Paulson writing about the 2008 financial crisis (On the Brink), Stanford University professor Robert Sutton's provocative management bestsellers (The No Asshole Rule and Good Boss, Bad Boss); Ted Turner's autobiography (Call Me Ted), humorists James Finn Garner (Politically Correct Bedtime Stories), Bill Geist (Little League Confidential); long-time Ohio politico John Kasich (Stand for Something); Japan-based journalist Robert Whiting (You Gotta Have Wa); economist Stephen Leeb (The Coming Economic Collapse); US Navy Captain Mike Abrashoff (It's Your Ship); and retirement expert Doug Andrew (Missed Fortune 101).

Wolff also acquires narrative non-fiction, including the critically acclaimed Little Pink House by Jeff Benedict, which focused on the controversial U. S. Supreme Court eminent domain case of Susette Kelo; an extraordinary World War II story entitled A Tale of Two Subs by Jonathan McCullough, and The Accountant's Story by Roberto Escobar, the surviving brother (and accountant) of Pablo Escobar's Medellin drug cartel, and Righteous Indignation by conservative journalist Andrew Breitbart. Wolff acquired the memoir of long-time CBS anchorman Dan Rather.

Wolff was also well known for his passion for sports books. In addition to Tiger Woods, some of Wolff's other bestselling sports authors include Duke University basketball coach Mike Krzyzewski, Bo Schembechler, Roger Angell, Roger Kahn, Jim Murray, Peter Golenbock, Grant Hill, Keyshawn Johnson, UConn's Geno Auriemma, Pete Rose, Jeff Benedict (Pros and Cons: The Criminals Who Play in the NFL), Mike Sowell (The Pitch That Killed); and Travis Roy (11 Seconds).

In his days at Macmillan, Wolff served as the editor of The Baseball Encyclopedia for three editions. During his tenure, he updated many of the key batting statistics that had become inaccurate over time, and he also added new feature to this classic volume which featured players and their statistics of many of the top Negro leagues players and also the top players from the All-American Woman's Professional Baseball League.

Wolff also penned a number of sports titles himself, one of his later efforts being a collaboration with Hall of Famer Cal Ripken Jr on sports parenting (Parenting Young Athletes the Ripken Way, which was published by Gotham Books in 2006). On the humor side, Wolff's writing included Golf Dirty Tricks (Andrews McMeel) and the parody Sports Illstated (Andrews McMeel).

With fiction, Wolff guided the writing careers of several top authors, including Matthew Klein (Con Ed), David Fisher (The Good Guys), and Tim Green, who wrote several bestselling thrillers (The Letter of the Law, Fifth Angel, Exact Revenge, The First 48, The Fourth Perimeter).

A magna cum laude graduate of Harvard University in 1974, Wolff's first book (What's A Nice Harvard Boy Like You Doing in the Bushes?) was a diary of his minor league baseball life and was published by Prentice-Hall. That unique writing experience ultimately led to his pursuit of a career in publishing.

== Death ==
Wolff died on April 10, 2023, at the age of 71.

== List of books authored ==
- Good Sports: A Concerned Parent's Guide to Little League and Other Competitive Youth Sports
- Coaching Kids for Dummies
- Game Day Baseball: The Player's Companion
- What's a Nice Harvard Boy Like You Doing in the Bushes?
- Parenting Young Athletes the Ripken Way: Ensuring the Best Experience for Your Kids in Any Sport (co-authored with Cal Ripken Jr.)
- Playing Better Baseball
- Golf Dirty Tricks (co authored by Jim Becker, Andy Mayer and Barrie Maguire)
- Ted Williams (Baseball Legends)
- Sports Parenting (Training Camp Guide to)
- Brooks Robinson (Baseball Legends)
- Sports Parenting Edge
- A Thing or Two About Soccer (co authored with Michael Teitelbaum and James Buckley)
- A Thing Or Two About Baseball (co authored with David Fischer)
- A Thing of Two about Golf (co authored with Larry Dennis and James Irwin)
- Life for Real Dummies: Life for the Totally Clueless (For Dummies Series) (co authored with Richard Sandomir)
- Sports Illustrated: A Parody Issue
- Breaking Into the Big Leagues (co authored with Al Goldis)
- Baseball...a Laughing Matter! (co authored with Warner Fusselle, Brian Zevnik, Bill Wilson)
- The Psychology of Winning Baseball: A Coach's Handbook
- The Sports Parenting Edge: The Winning Game Plan for Every Athlete--From T-Ball to College Recruiting
