= The Secrets of Triangles =

2012 book by Alfred S. Posamentier and Ingmar Lehmann

- Author: Alfred S. Posamentier, Ingmar Lehmann
- Genre: Mathematics
- Publisher: Prometheus Books
- Publication date: 2012

The Secrets of Triangles: A Mathematical Journey is a popular mathematics book on the geometry of triangles. It was written by Alfred S. Posamentier and Ingmar Lehmann, and published in 2012 by Prometheus Books.

== Topics ==
The book consists of ten chapters, with the first six concentrating on triangle centers while the final four cover more diverse topics including the area of triangles, inequalities involving triangles, straightedge and compass constructions, and fractals.

Beyond the classical triangle centers (the circumcenter, incenter, orthocenter, and centroid) the book covers other centers including the Brocard points, Fermat point, Gergonne point, and other geometric objects associated with triangle centers such as the Euler line, Simson line, and nine-point circle.

The chapter on areas includes both trigonometric formulas and Heron's formula for computing the area of a triangle from its side lengths, and the chapter on inequalities includes the Erdős–Mordell inequality on sums of distances from the sides of a triangle and Weitzenböck's inequality relating the area of a triangle to that of squares on its sides. Under constructions, the book considers 95 different triples of elements from which a triangle's shape may be determined (taken from its side lengths, angles, medians, heights, or angle bisectors) and describes how to find a triangle with each combination for which this is possible. Triangle-related fractals in the final chapter include the Sierpiński triangle and Koch snowflake.

== Audience and reception ==
Reviewer Alasdair McAndrew criticizes the book as being too "breathless" in its praise of the geometry it discusses and too superficial to be of interest to professional mathematicians, and Patricia Baggett writes that little of its content would be of use in high school mathematics education. However, Baggett suggests that it may be usable as a reference work, and similarly Robert Dawson suggests using its chapter on inequalities in this way. The book is written at a level suitable for high school students and interested amateurs, and McAndrew recommends the book to them.

Both Baggett and Gerry Leversha find the chapter on fractals (written by Robert A. Chaffer) to be the weakest part of the book, and Joop van der Vaart calls this chapter interesting but not a good fit for the rest of the book. Leversha calls the chapter on area "a bit of a mish-mash". Otherwise, Baggett evaluates the book as "well written and well illustrated", although lacking a glossary. Robert Dawson calls the book "very readable", and recommends it to any mathematics library.

== See also ==
- Encyclopedia of Triangle Centers
- 99 Points of Intersection
