= Hind Rassam Culhane =

Iraqi-American academic and journalist

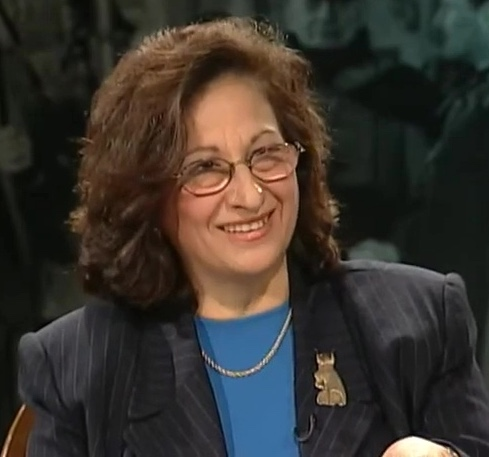
- Culhane on CUNY TV's City Cinematheque, 1998
- Born: Hind Noel Rassam; Mosul, Iraq
- Spouse: John Culhane (m. 1960; died 2015)
- Children: 2

Academic background
- Education: Rockford College (BS, MEd); Columbia University (PhD)

Academic work
- Discipline: Child development Adolescent psychology
- Institutions: Damascus University; Mercy College

Hind Rassam Culhane is an Iraqi-born American educator and former journalist.

== Early life and education ==
Rassam Culhane was born in Mosul, Iraq, to an Iraqi-Assyrian father and a Lebanese mother. As a child, she and her family moved to the United States. Rassam Culhane studied at Cazenovia College before earning a bachelor's degree in psychology and a master's degree in early childhood education from Rockford College.

== Career ==
Rassam Culhane moved to New York City with her husband and worked at Newsweek. She later became a professor at Mercy College and began her doctorate at Teachers College, Columbia University. She often gives lectures on Iraq's history and civilization as a way of embracing her culture and heritage.

She is the chair of the Division of Social and Behavioral Sciences at Mercy College. She was also a teacher at the Damascus University - Faculty of Medicine, where she taught courses on child development, adolescent disorders and health service delivery.

== Personal life ==
Rassam Culhane met her husband, John Culhane, while attending college. They had two children together, Michael and Thomas. John Culhane died in 2015 at the age of 81.
