= Human Rights Internet =

Canadian non-governmental organization

- Founded: 1976
- Type: non-governmental organization
- Purpose: Human Rights, Knowledge Sharing
- Location: Ottawa, Ontario, Canada
- Website: hri.ca

Human Rights Internet (also referred to as HRI) is a non-governmental organization (NGO), not-for-profit based in Ottawa, Canada. Its mission is twofold: to inspire education, advocacy, and dialogue in Canada; and, to document and disseminate information on human rights.

Today, this mission is supported through two programs. Its HRI Small Grants Competition awards funding through a competitive process to Canadian-based non-governmental organizations, community organizations, schools, and individuals who propose initiatives in Canada which support any one of the rights stated in the Universal Declaration of Human Rights.

These grants are funded by HRI’s second program, international human rights grey literature collections. Historically, HRI served as a non-governmental repository for English language documentation produced by human rights NGOs worldwide. The repository began in 1980. HRI has continued to collate and catalogue documents which span a broad range of human rights issues from all regions of the world. A Dutch company, Brill/IDC Publishers, makes these documents available for a fee. Originally packaged in a microfiche format, in 2024, there are now six collections with over 77,000 human rights documents available from Brill/IDC Publishers as full-text, searchable online databases, making it the largest database of its kind. These collections are:

- Human Rights Documents

- Climate Change and the Law

- Rights of the Child, Women’s Rights, Reproductive Rights, LGBTQ+ and Gender

- Economy and Inequality

- Environment, Sustainability and Climate

- Technology, Democracy and Society

HISTORY

HRI was co-founded by the political scientist Laurie S. Wiseberg. Launched in 1976 under the name InterNet: the International Human Rights Documentation Network, the organization came to be known as Human Rights Internet (HRI). It employed the term InterNet six years before the Internet protocol suite (TCP/IP) was introduced as the standard networking protocol on the ARPANET, the precursor to the modern Internet. Originally the organization employed the term to refer to the concept of an international network of human rights organizations.

HRI became affiliated with the Harvard University Law School from 1985 until 1990. HRI was independent of, but worked in cooperation with, the Law School’s Human Rights Program. In 1990, HRI moved to Ottawa and was initially affiliated with the University of Ottawa (again, the organization was independent but worked in cooperation with the university's Human Rights Research and Education Centre). In 1994 HRI left its university location and operated from its own office in Ottawa. Today it is an entirely virtual office. HRI had been a registered non-governmental organization in both the USA and Canada. It dissolved the corporation in the USA in the early 2000s. The Canadian corporation remains active. It is governed by a volunteer board. In 2012, the board decided to form a “virtual office”, with board members, staff and consultants working remotely.

For nearly 15 years (1998 until 2013), HRI managed a number of internship programs. Hundreds of Canadian youth were placed and supported in internships in foreign countries through the International Youth Internship Program (IYIP). Funding for these internships came from the Canadian International Development Agency (CIDA), the Canadian Department of Foreign Affairs and International Trade (DFAIT), and Industry Canada.

HRI was also home to the Initiative on Quiet Diplomacy, referred to as IQD. The Initiative aimed at preventing violent conflict through co-operative, problem-solving and quiet diplomatic arrangements within regional and sub-regional inter-governmental organizations. Publications from this Initiative included:

- Equal Women’s Participation in Peace Processes

- Land and Conflict Prevention Handbook

HRI also published the Human Rights Tribune from 1992 to 2006.
