= Elementary School Journal =

- Discipline: Education
- Language: English

Publication details
- History: 1900–present
- Publisher: University of Chicago Press (US)
- Frequency: Quarterly
- Impact factor: 1.393 (2017)

Standard abbreviations
- ISO 4: Elem. Sch. J.

Indexing
- ISSN: 0013-5984

Links
- Journal homepage

The Elementary School Journal (ESJ) is a quarterly academic journal published by the University of Chicago Press that focuses on elementary and middle school education.

ESJ publishes articles dealing with both education theory and research and their implications for teaching practice. The Journal also presents articles on research in child development, cognitive psychology, and sociology to school learning and teaching.

== History ==
Established in 1900 as The Course of Study at the Chicago Institute, it was renamed The Elementary School Teacher and Course of Study in 1901 after the Chicago Institute became part of the University of Chicago. Subsequently, it was renamed The Elementary School Teacher in 1902. The journal changed to its present title in 1914 and has remained in publication since then. University of Chicago Press continued to publish the journal after the closure of the School of Education. The journal was edited by Thomas L. Good for 28 years.
