= Judson Rosebush =

American writer (born 1947)

Judson Rosebush (b. October 1, 1947, Wooster, Ohio) is a director and producer of multimedia products and computer animation, an author, artist and media theorist. He is the founder of Digital Effects Inc. and the Judson Rosebush Company. He is the former editor of Pixel Vision magazine, the serialized Pixel Handbook, and a columnist for CD-ROM Professional magazine. He has worked in radio and TV, film and video, sound, print, and hypermedia, including CD-ROM and the Internet. He has been an ACM National Lecturer since the late 1980s and is a recipient of its Distinguished Speaker Award.

Rosebush graduated from the College of Wooster in 1969 and received a Ph.D. from Syracuse University in 1984.

== Career ==
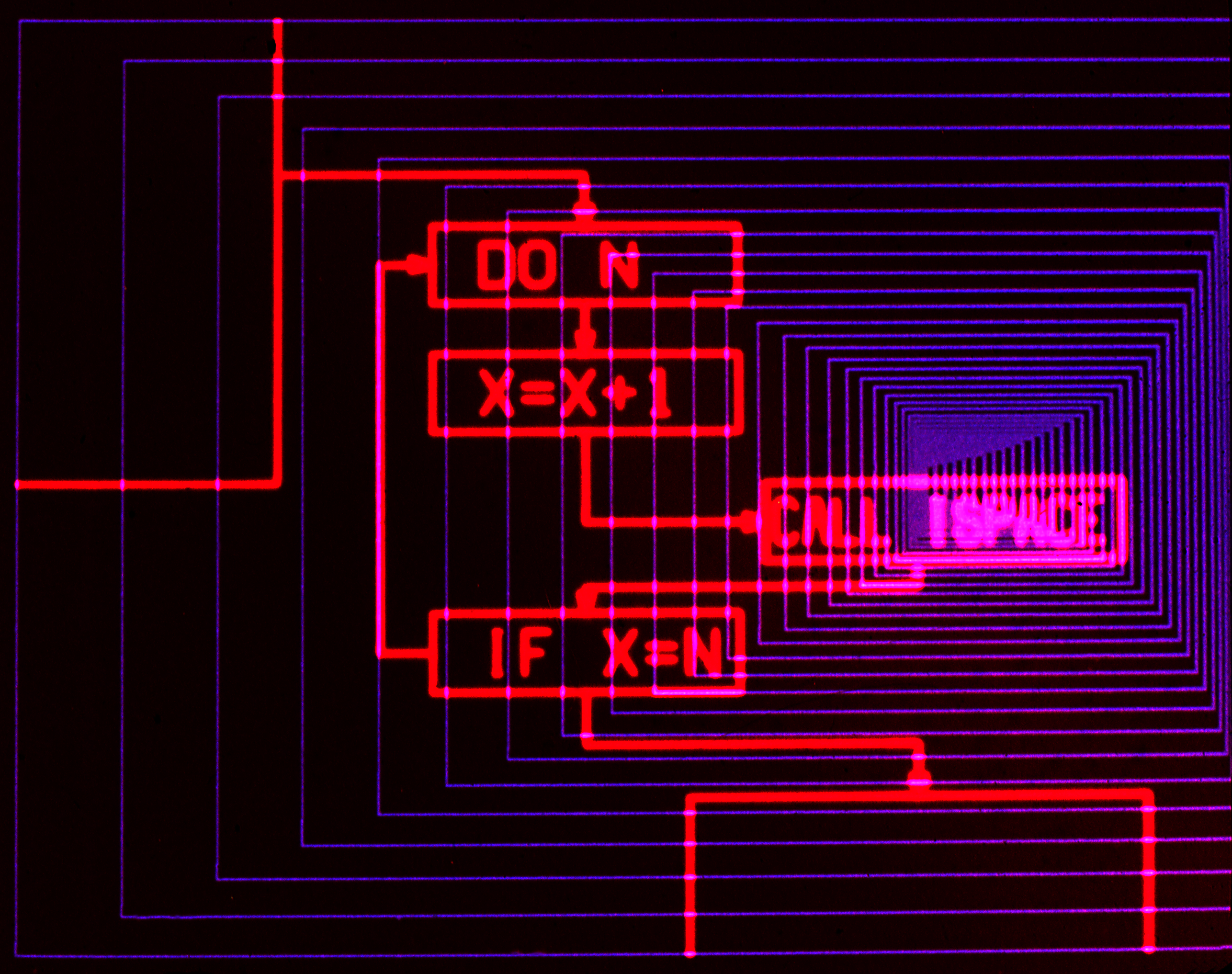
Judson Rosebush "Space ‡," 1974, Call Ispace JGR19740601 01

.

Rosebush began working in computer animation in 1970, founding the company Digital Effects Inc. in New York City in 1978. As the first 3D digital computer animation company in New York, Digital Effects had to pioneer its own software. In 1986, two years after Digital Effects ceased operations, Rosebush founded the Judson Rosebush Company. Formerly located in Carnegie Hall, the company produces consumer CD-ROMs, business-to-business CD-ROMs and websites.

Rosebush's television credits include directing over 1000 commercials and logos for advertising agencies and networks worldwide; feature film credits include Walt Disney's Tron.

In the early 1990s, Rosebush co-authored and directed television programs on Volume Visualization and HDTV and the Quest for Virtual Reality. He participated on FCC working groups on HDTV. In the late 1990s, he was drafted to collect and write histories about computer graphics, including the feature film The Story of Computer Graphics.

Rosebush is a consultant for media technology companies in America, Europe, and Brazil. He assisted Hammond Map in designing their digital mapping system, worked with Oxberry Corporation to install the first digital motion picture scanners in New York and Beijing, and has performed expert witness work in Federal Court. He has also taught courses in computer graphics at Syracuse University, the School of Visual Arts, New York; Pratt Institute, Brooklyn; and Mercy College, Dobbs Ferry, New York.

Rosebush has exhibited computer-generated drawings and films in numerous museum shows, and the drawings have been reproduced in hundreds of magazines and books.

His most cited writings include "The Proceduralist Manifesto", a statement on computer art published in Leonardo; he is also known for his writings on computer graphics and new media. More popular credits include articles in The Village Voice and Rolling Stone Magazine.

== Select published CDs ==
- Isaac Asimov's The Ultimate Robot, published by Byron Preiss and Microsoft, 1993
- Gahan Wilson's The Ultimate Haunted House, Microsoft, 1994
- Ocean Voyager, The Smithsonian and Times Mirror Magazines, 1995
- The War in Vietnam, a joint venture between CBS News and The New York Times, distributed by MacMillan Digital, 1996
- Look What I See, the Metropolitan Museum of Art, 1996 and 2000
- Landmines: Clearing the Way, Rockefeller Foundation and the US Departments of State and Defense, 2002.

== Select bibliography ==
- Rosebush, J (1972). Nam June Paik: Video & Videography. Everson Museum of Art, Syracuse, New York.
- Rosebush, J; Lynn Pocock (January 15, 2002). The Computer Animator's Technical Handbook. Morgan Kaufmann. ISBN 0-12-558821-6.
- Rosebush, J; Steve Cunningham (September 1996). Electronic Publishing on CD-ROM : Authoring, Development, and Distribution. O'Reilly. ISBN 1-56592-209-3.
- Rosebush, J; Isaac Kerlow (January 15, 1994). Computer Graphics for Designers and Artists, 2nd edition. Van Nostrand Reinhold Co. ISBN 0-442-01430-9.
- Rosebush, J (January 2020). Burlesque: Exotic Dancers of the 50s and 60s. Schiffer Books. ISBN 9780764336676.
- Rosebush, J; Efrain Gonzalez (January 2020). Ink & Steel : The Body Modification Photography of Efrain John Gonzalez. Schiffer Books. ISBN 9780764341045.
