= Donna Gabaccia =

American academic

- Born: Donna Rae Gabaccia; 1949 (age 76–77)
- Occupation: Historian

Academic background
- Education: Mount Holyoke College; University of Michigan; Free University of Berlin
- Influences: Akira Iriye

Academic work
- Sub-discipline: International migration
- Institutions: Mercy College; University of North Carolina at Charlotte; University of Pittsburgh; University of Minnesota; University of Toronto Scarborough

Donna Rae Gabaccia (born 1949) is an American historian who studies international migration, with an emphasis on cultural exchange, such as food and from a gendered perspective. From 2003 to 2005 she was the Andrew Mellon Professor of History at the University of Pittsburgh and from 2005 to 2012 she held the Rudolph J. Vecoli Chair of Immigration History at the University of Minnesota. During the same period, she was the director of the Immigration History Research Center at the University of Minnesota. In 2013, her book, Foreign Relations: Global Perspectives on American Immigration won the Immigration and Ethnic History Society's Theodore Saloutos Prize in 2013.

== Early life and education ==
Donna Rae Gabaccia was born in 1949 and grew up in rural New York State. Her mother's family were immigrants to the United States from Germany and her father's family were Italian immigrants. As the first of her family to attend university, she was interested in her family migrations and began her studies in sociology. After completing a bachelor's degree at Mount Holyoke College, she earned her master's degree in history in 1975 from the University of Michigan. She then went on to complete her PhD at the University of Michigan in 1979 and did post-doctoral studies in Germany at the Free University of Berlin's John F. Kennedy Institute for North American Studies. While she was studying in Germany, Gabaccia took her first job, as a current events commentator for the German and American Forces Network Radio. She worked with projects with Amerika Haus Berlin and several museums.

== Career and research ==
Returning to the United States, after having learned both Italian and German, Gabaccia taught at Mercy College from 1982 to 1991. Her first book, From Sicily to Elizabeth Street: Housing and Social Change among Italian Immigrants, 1880–1930 (1984) evaluated working-class, residents on a single street, focusing on class and community among the immigrants living there. Her initial output evaluated migration through the lens of gender and household composition, rather than the conventional focus on privilege, which forces the family unit into an unknown abstraction, and the narrow focus on individualism. By focusing on the family, she was able to evaluate the separate economic contributions of family members and shifting power dynamics between genders. Two of Gabaccia's groundbreaking books, which both integrated women into migration studies and demonstrated the importance of an interdisciplinary approach were Immigrant Women in the United States: A Selectively Annotated Multidisciplinary Bibliography (1989) and Seeking Common Ground: Multidisciplinary Studies of Immigrant Women in the United States (1992). These books laid the foundation for her "pathbreaking work on gender and migration", From the Other Side: Women, Gender, and Immigrant Life in the U.S., 1820–1990 (1994).

In 1990, Gabaccia initiated a world-wide research network, "Italians Everywhere" to facilitate migration study for the period 1870 to 1970 of emigration from Italy. By bringing together specialists with global expertise on a variety of locations, the network was able to evaluate the cross-cultural contribution to nation building and identity. Three edited volumes, Italy's Many Diasporas: Elites, Exiles and Workers of the World (2000) with Fraser M. Ottanelli; Women, Gender and Transnational Lives: Italian Workers of the World (2002) with Franca Iacovetta; and Intimacy and Italian Migration: Gender and Domestic Lives in a Mobile World (2011) with Loretta Baldassar have been produced as a result of the interdisciplinary collaboration of the network. Abandoning nation-based analysis of migration, Gabaccia recognized that when people moved, it impacted both the place from which emigrants originated and the place where immigrants resettled. Gabaccia added depth to the understanding of migration, by showing that it was not a single national story; that destinations were not always finite but often immigrants moved back and forth between locations; and that assimilation was much more complex than a one-directional transfer of culture.

These works refuted the notion of transnationists, who believed that global migration was a contemporary 20th century phenomena, characterized by the utilization of technology to quickly assimilate but retain ties to their traditional homelands, which created a climate of dual allegiance that would ultimately undermine national socio-political organization. Gabaccia argued that the study of earlier migrations, not only showed that globalization was not a new phenomenon but that it was unclear whether it was either a permanent shift in cultural practices, sustainable over time, or whether it would lead to the demise of the nation-state. She pointed to the development of diaspora populations of earlier times of internationalism and cosmopolitanism, questioning whether transnationalism was an ideological belief held by migrants, or whether it had any permanency based on historical precedent.

From 1992 to 2003, Gabaccia was the Charles H. Stone Professor of American History at the University of North Carolina at Charlotte, taking the Andrew Mellon Professor of History at the University of Pittsburgh in 2003. Gabaccia left Pennsylvania in 2005 and until 2012, she held the Rudolph J. Vecoli Chair of Immigration History at the University of Minnesota. During the same period, she was the director of the Immigration History Research Center at the University of Minnesota. During this period, she continued steady production on works dedicated to migration patterns. She particularly focused on the history of women migrants and statistical analysis to bring deeper understanding to the gendered experiences of the past, including changing sexual standards. Her work also evaluated hierarchies of power and it fluctuations upon the agency among migrating people. She also studied the exchange of culture that is evident in food. Her book We Are What We Eat: Ethnic Food and the Making of Americans, evaluates how the food of migrants became a part of the mainstream American diet.

After stepping down from the position as director, Gabaccia remained as a professor at the University of Minnesota for two more years, moving to Toronto in 2014, where she teaches in the history department at University of Toronto Scarborough. In 2013, her book, Foreign Relations: Global Perspectives on American Immigration (2012), was translated and republished in Japanese and won the Immigration and Ethnic History Society's Theodore Saloutos Prize in 2013. Her book, Gender and International Migration: From the Slavery Era to the Global Age (2015), written with Katharine Donato, was shortlisted for the American Sociological Association's Thomas and Znaniecki Book Award, winning honorable mention in 2016. In addition to her academic work, throughout her career Gabaccia has worked as a consultant and collaborator with groups of public school teachers, local and national museums, and historical societies to develop a collaborative understanding of knowledge and interpretations of the past. Among those, organizations were the Gilder Lehrman Institute of American History, the International Coalition of Sites of Conscience, the Levine Museum of the New South, the Lower East Side Tenement Museum, the National Endowment for the Humanities, National Public Radio, the United States Department of Labor and the Ward Museum of Toronto.

== Selected works ==
- Gabaccia, Donna R. (1984). From Sicily to Elizabeth Street: Housing and Social Change among Italian Immigrants, 1880–1930. Albany, New York: State University of New York Press. ISBN 978-1-4384-0354-0.
- Gabaccia, Donna R. (1989). Immigrant Women in the United States: A Selectively Annotated Multidisciplinary Bibliography. New York, New York: Greenwood Press. ISBN 978-0-313-26452-8.
- Gabaccia, Donna R. (1992). Seeking Common Ground: Multidisciplinary Studies of Immigrant Women in the United States. Westport, Connecticut: Praeger Publishing. ISBN 978-0-275-94387-5.
- Gabaccia, Donna R. (1994). From the Other Side: Women, Gender, and Immigrant Life in the U.S., 1820-1990. Bloomington, Indiana: Indiana University Press. ISBN 978-0-253-32529-7.
- Gabaccia, Donna R. (2000). We Are What We Eat: Ethnic Food and the Making of Americans. Cambridge, Massachusetts: Harvard University Press. ISBN 978-0-674-00190-9.
- Gabaccia, Donna R.; Ottanelli, Fraser M. (2000). Italy's Many Diasporas: Elites, Exiles and Workers of the World. London: University College London Press. ISBN 978-1-85728-582-6.
- Gabaccia, Donna R.; Iacovetta, Franca (2002). Women, Gender and Transnational Lives: Italian Workers of the World. Toronto, Ontario: University of Toronto Press. ISBN 978-0-8020-8462-0.
- Donato, Katharine M.; Gabaccia, Donna; Holdaway, Jennifer; Manalansan, IV, Martin; Pessar, Patricia R. (Spring 2006). "A Glass Half Full? Gender in Migration Studies". The International Migration Review. 40 (1). Thousand Oaks, California: Sage Publications for the Center for Migration Studies of New York, Inc.: 3–26. doi:10.1111/j.1747-7379.2006.00001.x. ISSN 0197-9183. JSTOR 27645577. OCLC 195062021. S2CID 143983094.
- Baldassar, Loretta; Gabaccia, Donna R. (2011). Intimacy and Italian Migration: Gender and Domestic Lives in a Mobile World. New York, New York: Fordham University Press. ISBN 978-0-8232-3184-3.
- Gabaccia, Donna R.; Maynes, Mary Jo (November 2012). "Introduction: Gender History Across Epistemologies". Gender & History. 24 (3: Special). Hoboken, New Jersey: Wiley-Blackwell: 521–539. doi:10.1111/j.1468-0424.2012.01696.x. ISSN 0953-5233. OCLC 884428371. S2CID 145085086.
- Gabaccia, Donna R.; Maynes, Mary Jo, eds. (2013). Gender History Across Epistemologies. Chichester, West Sussex: John Wiley & Sons. ISBN 978-1-118-50822-0.
- Gabaccia, Donna R. (2012). Foreign Relations: American Immigration in Global Perspective. America in the World. Princeton, New Jersey: Princeton University Press. ISBN 978-0-691-16365-9.
- Donato, Katharine M.; Gabaccia, Donna (2015). Gender and International Migration: From the Slavery Era to the Global Age. New York, New York: Russell Sage Foundation. ISBN 978-1-61044-847-5.
