= Katharine Elizabeth O'Brien =

American mathematician, musician and poet

Katharine Elizabeth O'Brien (1901 – 1986) was an American mathematician, musician and poet.

== Early life ==
Born in Amesbury, Massachusetts to parents who had emigrated from Ireland, O'Brien's family moved to Maine while at the age of three. She was class valedictorian when she graduated from Deering High School in Portland, Maine in 1917. She then attended nearby Bates College from which she graduated in 1922 with honors in both mathematics and science. Despite her science-focused majors, she also was drawn to and pursued both poetry and music.

== Higher education and career ==
O'Brien continued to take courses in mathematics, at Smith College, from 1922 to 1923. In 1924, she earned a master's degree in mathematics at Cornell with a major focus in geometry and a minor in analysis. She taught mathematics briefly in 1925, at Jordan High School in Lewiston, Maine. She joined the faculty at the College of New Rochelle as an English teacher, but soon moved to mathematics. She became the chair of the mathematics department, and remained there for 11 years.

Beginning in 1936, she studied for a doctorate at Brown University, completing her Ph.D. in mathematical analysis in 1939. At Brown, she worked with Jacob Tamarkin as her advisor; her dissertation was Some Problems in Interpolation by Characteristic Functions of Linear Differential Systems of the Fourth Order.

In 1940, O'Brien joined the faculty at Deering High School in Portland, Maine, and she taught there until her retirement in 1971.

== Books ==
O'Brien was the author of Sequences (Houghton-Mifflin Mathematics Enrichment Series, 1966). Some of her poetry was collected in the book Excavation and Other Verse (Anthoensen Press, 1967).

== Recognition ==
The University of Maine gave O'Brien an honorary doctorate in 1960, and Bowdoin College gave her another in 1965.

O'Brien won the Deborah Morton Award, an annual award for Maine women of distinction, in 1985.

She also became a fellow of the International Academy of Poetry and, in 1967, an elected member of the New York Academy of Sciences.
