= Boria Sax =

American writer

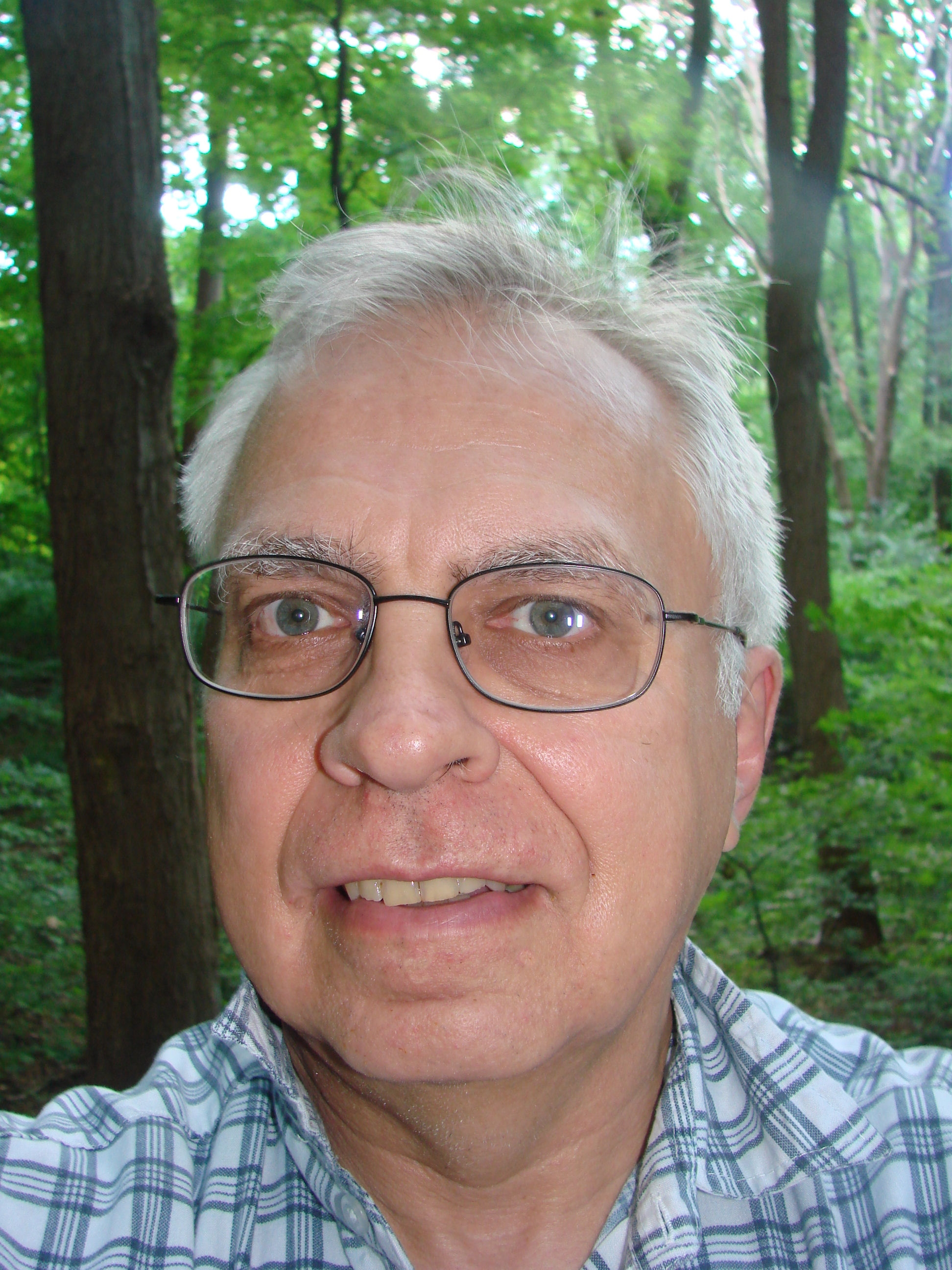
- Born: Boria L. Sax; March 31, 1949 (age 77)
- Education: State University of New York, Buffalo
- Occupations: Author, lecturer, teacher
- Spouse: Linda
- Parent(s): Saville Sax and Susan Winifred Healey
- Relatives: Sarah Sax (sister); Joshua Sax (brother)
- Website: www.BoriaSax.com

Boria Sax (born March 31, 1949) is an American author and lecturer and a teacher at Mercy University.

Boria Sax is probably best known for his writing on human-animal relations, where he has developed a style that combines scholarship with narrative and lyricism. He views the representation of animals in human culture as a means to explore human identity, as well as an enduring source of myths and legends. The publications of Boria Sax include books of scholarship, poetry, reference, translation, memoirs, and other genres.

Two of the scholarly books have been named to list of “outstanding academic titles of the year” compiled by the journal Choice: Animals in the Third Reich: Pets, Scapegoats, and the Holocaust (Continuum, 2000) and The Mythical Zoo: An Encyclopedia of Animals in Myth, Legend, and Literature (ABC-CLIO, 2002). His books have been translated into French, Japanese, Korean, Turkish and Czech.

== Biography ==
Boria Sax was born in 1949 to Saville Sax. He received his doctorate in Intellectual History and German from State University of New York, Buffalo. He has worked as a consultant on human rights for Amnesty International, Helsinki Watch, and Human Rights Internet. He is also the founder of the non-profit organization “Nature in Legend and Story,” dedicated to “promote understanding of traditional bonds between human beings and the natural world.”

== Publications ==
=== Scholarship and translations ===
- City of Ravens: The True History of the Legendary Birds in the Tower of London. London: Duckworth, forthcoming May 2011.
- Contacts/Kontakte: Poems and Writings of Lutz Rathenow (edited anthology of translations). Providence: The Poet's Press, 1985.
- The Romantic Heritage of Marxism: A Study of East German Love Poetry. Bern: Peter Lang, 1987.
- The Frog King: On Fairy Tales, Fables and Anecdotes of Animals. New York: Pace University Press, 1990.
- The Parliament of Animals: Legends and Anecdotes from Books of Natural History, 1775 1900 New York: Pace University Press, 1992.
- The Serpent and the Swan: Animal Brides in Literature and Folklore. Knoxville: U. of Tennessee Press, 1998 (formerly published by McDonald & Woodward Publishing Co.).
- The Fantastic, Ordinary World of Lutz Rathenow (edited anthology of translations). Sacramento: Xenos Books, 2001.
- Animals in the Third Reich: Pets, Scapegoats, and the Holocaust. Continuum International Publishing Group. 2000. ISBN 0-8264-1289-0.
- The Mythical Zoo: An A-Z of Animals in World Myth, Legend, and Literature. ABC-CLIO. 2002. ISBN 1-57607-612-1.
- Crow. Reaktion Books. 2003. ISBN 1-86189-194-6.
- City of Ravens: The Extraordinary History of London, its Tower, and its Famous Ravens. Duckworth-Overlook: New York, 2011–2012.
- Imaginary Animals: The Monstrous, the Wondrous, and the Human. London: Reaktion, 2013.
- The Mythical Zoo: Animals in Myth, Legend, and Literature. New York: Overlook, 2013.
- Dinomania: Why We Love, Fear and Are Utterly Enchanted by Dinosaurs. London: Reaktion, 2019.

=== Memoir ===
- Stealing Fire: A Childhood in the Shadow of Atomic Espionage. Decalogue Books: Yonkers, 2014.

=== Study guides ===
- Thomas Mann's Death in Venice (study guide). Piscataway, NJ: Research and Education Association, 1996.
- The Romance of Sir Gawain and the Green Knight (study guide). Parsippany, NJ: Research and Education Association, 1996.
- William Faulkner's The Sound and the Fury. (study guide). Parsippany, NJ: Research and Education Association, 1996.

=== Chapbooks and poetry ===
- The Raven and the Sun: Poems and Stories. Providence: The Poet's Press, 2010.
- When the Glaciers Melted. New Paltz: Cloud Mountain Press, 1973.
- Rheinland Market. Buffalo: Textile Bridge Press, 1983.
- I am that Snowflake. Providence: The Poet's Press, 1987.

=== Articles ===
- Sax, Boria (1997-10-05). "The Boy Who Gave Away the Bomb". The New York Times.
