= Esther Rolick =

American painter (1922–2008)

- Esther Rolick at Yaddo, 1953
- Born: Esther Gwendolyn Rolick; October 9, 1922; Rochester, New York, US
- Died: September 29, 2008 (aged 85); Rochester, New York, US
- Resting place: Britton Road Cemetery, Greece, New York

Esther Rolick (1922–2008) was an American painter born in Rochester, New York, on October 9, 1922. She studied at the Art Students League and was represented by Jacques Seligmann Galleries in New York in the early 1950's. She was a fellow at Yaddo and the MacDowell Colony, and her exhibition credits range from the Whitney Museum of American Art to Le Centre D'Art in Haiti. Rolick traveled and painted extensively, especially in Bogota, Colombia, Rome, and Tahiti. She is listed in Who Was Who in American Art, and her papers are in the Archives of American Art of the Smithsonian Institution.

She was known for her style which was considered to be both expressionist and neo-romantic. In some of her works she painted with what one critic called "meticulous realism" but was better known for works incorporating fantastic elements. Her most prolific periods centered around dream-scapes of fantasy plants, flowers, and peaceful and friendly wildlife. She was one of the few female artists in the avante-gard movement of the late 1940s and 1950s. She taught college classes for many years and achieved recognition for taking innovative approaches.

== Early life and training ==
Rolick attended public schools in Rochester, New York and graduated from the city's Washington High School in 1940. She took art classes while in school and also studied under the sculptor William Ehrich in Rochester's Memorial Art Gallery. In 1941, a local newspaper printed a photo of Rolick with a sculpted figure called "The Refugee", a piece that was to appear in a student exhibition in the gallery of Rochester's Rundel Memorial Library. She traveled to New York City in the early 1940s to study under the American expressionist artist, Harry Sternberg, and others at the Art Students League. In 1945 and 1946 and again in 1953, Yaddo, the philanthropically supported artists' community in Saratoga Springs, New York, accepted her applications for its weeks-long residencies. In 1948, she was able to travel and study in Europe for the first time, possibly with financial support from the actress Hildegarde Watson. In 1947 and 1952, she received fellowship awards to work at the MacDowell Colony in Peterborough, New Hampshire. In 1954, she received a fellowship from the Huntington Hartford Foundation to work at an estate in Pacific Palisades, California.

== Career in art ==
In 1943, Rolick participated in an annual competition held by the A.C.A Gallery in New York to select an artist for a solo exhibition during the following year. When the gallery's jury was unable to select a winner, she and six other finalists were named to an honorable-mention group for a small-group show instead. In January 1947, she was given a solo exhibition of drawings at the Jacques Seligmann Galleries in New York and a few months later her paintings appeared in a group show at the Los Angeles County Museum of Art. (Note: Other artists who showed with her in the LACMA exhibition included Max Weber, Robert Gwathmey, Charles Howard, John Marin, Marsden Hartley, Perle Fine, Wolfgang von Paalen, and Philip Evergood.) When the Seligmann Galleries gave her a solo exhibition of paintings in January 1948, a critic for the New York Times noted in them a "directness and fervor" and said they showed considerable improvement on the works she had previously shown. When that exhibition closed in New York, Seligmann toured it around the country. When it appeared in Louisville, Kentucky, a critic for the Louisville Courier-Journal said Rolick had been remarkably successful for a 24-year-old artist, having made sales to collectors, including the art historian Wilhelm Valentiner. Later in 1948, Seligmann included Rolick's paintings in a group of six. At that time a Times critic called her paintings "technically sure and sophisticated".

During the 1950s and 1960s, she traveled abroad to places having warm climates with abundant sunshine, including Italy, Spain, North Africa, Haiti, and Colombia. Scenes from these locations subsequently frequently appeared in her work. in New York City she maintained a small studio and her inner circle was composed of avant-garde artists of the time including Jackson Pollack.

Rolick presented a solo exhibition of paintings, sculptures, and drawings in 1950 at the Rochester Historical Society. Later in the year, she received a settlement payment in a suit she had brought after a warehouse fire had destroyed many of her paintings. Four years later, Seligman mounted her third solo show. In it, Howard Devree of the New York Times saw higher-key, more decorative work than he had seen before along with some of the "sturdy, primarily expressionist paintings" he had previously noted.

During the remainder of the 1950s, Rolick had solo exhibitions in both commercial and nonprofit galleries, including the Rochester Historical Society (paintings and drawings, 1956), the Harry Salpeter Gallery in New York (recent paintings, 1956), the F.A.R. Gallery in New York (drawings, 1959), and the art gallery at Hofstra University (oils, watercolors, and drawings, 1959). There were few solo or group exhibitions of her work during the rest of her life. (Note: During this period, Rolick was given solo exhibitions in the Women's City Club, New York, 1960, paintings and drawings), in the David Stuart Galleries, Los Angeles, 1966 paintings), in the art gallery of Mercy College, New York, 1967 and 1970, drawings, collages, photographs, and constructions), and in the Osterling/Howard Gallery, Rochester, 2005, drawings and paintings). She also showed paintings in a three-artist exhibition at the Bridge Gallery, White Plains, New York in 1979.) In the early 1990s, Rolick moved from Manhattan back to Rochester. She died in a nursing home in Rochester in 2008.

=== Artistic style ===
Esther Rolick, Untitled Painting, 1941, oil on canvas, 30 x 48 inches

Esther Rolick, Self-Portrait in Shoe, 1942, graphite on paper, 6 1/16 x 4 11/16 inches

Esther Rolick, Nuns and Priest Pass by Ruins, Florence, 1948–1949, oil on canvas, 27 x 39 inches

Esther Rolick, Night Is a Black Cat, 1951, oil on canvas board, 26 x 17 1/2 inches

Rolick made sculptures and drawings early in her career but received most notice for her oils. She was known for realist paintings and fantastic treatment of natural subjects. One critic saw a Van Gogh-like immediacy and emotional content in them. Another saw this directness as freedom from "extraneous thoughts". Her work was labeled expressionist and neo-romantic. Mid-career, she showed watercolors along with oils and drawings. Critics' reactions were much the same as before. One said she had a flair for dramatic presentation and expressionist emotional projection. Others noted her bold use of colors and stylized treatment of natural subjects—"fantasy paintings" that were "based on keen observation". At the end of her career, her work drew little comment. In that period, she added collages and constructions to the paintings and drawings for which she continued to be best known.

An untitled painting of animals and human figured from 1941, shown at right, shows her handling of color and treatment of fantastic subjects in oil. A drawing from 1942, "Self-Portrait in Shoe", shown at left, indicates a light-hearted use of fantasy early in her career. An oil of 1948-1949 called "Nuns and Priest Pass by Ruins, Florence", shown at right, indicates her mid-career handling of color and fantasy in an urban setting. At left, another oil, "Night Is a Black Cat", of 1951, shows her ability to paint in a decorative style while still maintaining what a critic called "sinister" overtones. Her series of paintings entitled "Dream Garden" is probably her most famous offering and was hung in the Museum of Modern Art in the 1960s. Other paintings hang in museums the world over. The series of paintings entitled "The Creation of the World" remain in major private collections. Her landscapes and paintings of the animal world are sought after but most remain in private family collections and rarely come up for auction.

== Art teacher ==
In the mid-1960s, Rolick began to teach at Mercy College. The school was founded in 1950 by the Sisters of Mercy religious order. Originally located in Tarrytown, New York as a school for women called Mercy Junior College, it moved to nearby Dobbs Ferry in 1961 and, now known as Mercy College, became a four-year school. In 1968 it received accreditation and subsequently became independent, nonsectarian, and coeducational. Having joined the faculty at about the time the school expanded its curriculum and moved to Dobbs Ferry, she was an assistant professor of fine arts by 1970. By 1979, her course load included drawing, multi-media, and art appreciation. During the roughly two decades that she taught there, she helped develop several innovative programs including a class on "Black Music and Art" of 1970–71 in which she interviewed prominent members of the Harlem music and art communities. (Note: Interviewees included Charles Alston; Benny Andrews; Romare Bearden; W. Joseph Black of the Harlem Music Center; Robert Blackburn; Valerie Capers; Roy DeCarava; Allen Fannin, a hand spinner, weaver, and entrepreneur; Dorothy Fannin, his wife; Alvin Hollingsworth; Jean Hutson; Jacob Lawrence; Norman Lewis; John Rhoden; Edward S. Spriggs, director of the Harlem Studio Museum; Hale Woodruff and artists affiliated with the Cinque Gallery of Harlem, the Weusi Artist Collective, and the Spiral arts alliance.) Mercy College had a reputation of innovative programming, including evening and weekend classes. As one component of this innovation, Rolick joined with a member of the music department in 1979 to teach classes that began at 1:30 in the morning.

== Personal life and family ==
Rolick was born on October 9, 1922, in Rochester, New York. Her father was Ellis Rolick. The family name was originally "Rolnik" and there are several branches of the family still bearing that name both in the United States and Israel. He ran a local shoe store and was well known for selling boots and shoes to farmers out of a hand-pushed barrow at the Rochester Public Market. Rolick's mother was Rose (Lifschitz) Rolick, who helped her husband run the shoe business while also raising a large family.

There is little information about Rolick's personal life. Reliable sources do not contain evidence of marriage, close friendships, or most other personal affairs. She had one child given up for adoption in the late 1940s.

Rolick lived in Manhattan during most of her career. She returned to Rochester in the early 1990s and, in the early years of the next decade, moved to the Jewish Home of Rochester, a long-term care facility. She died there on September 29, 2008.
