= Ira Joe Fisher =

American broadcaster, poet, and educator

- Born: Ira Joe Fisher; October 31, 1947 (age 78); Salamanca, New York, U.S.
- Education: New England College
- Occupations: Broadcast journalism, teaching
- Notable credit: The Saturday Early Show
- Spouse: Shelly Fisher
- Children: 4

Ira Joe Fisher (born October 31, 1947, Salamanca, New York) is an American retired broadcaster, poet, and educator. From 1999 to 2006, he was the weather reporter for CBS's The Saturday Early Show. He is known for his ability to write backwards on Plexiglas during his weather presentations.

== Background ==
Fisher spent his childhood in Cattaraugus County, New York, a rural area in Western New York, south of Buffalo. He was born in Salamanca, got his first job at WGGO there, and graduated from Little Valley Central High School in 1965. He attended college at the State University of New York at Fredonia but left before graduating for a four-year stint in the Air Force. He was stationed in Syracuse, New York and attended Syracuse University, majoring in drama and Russian; he later worked for the Air Force as a Russian translator. He has a Master of Fine Arts from New England College.

Fisher has been a college professor, author, columnist, poet, disc jockey, reporter, actor, and weatherman. He played himself in the 1985 TV movie California Girls, and starting in 1995, he played the role of Hucklebee in approximately 500 performances of the long-running off-Broadway musical The Fantasticks. He is the author of three works of poetry: a chapbook titled Remembering Rew, and two full-length collections, Some Holy Weight in the Village Air and Songs from an Earlier Century. He has extensively studied the life and works of Robert Frost, and has taught poetry at the University of Connecticut, New England College, Pace University, and Mercy College.

Fisher lives in Connecticut with his wife Shelly. They have four children: Joshua, Shelby, Ashley, and Dylan.

== Television career ==
Fisher began his television career at KHQ-TV in Spokane, Washington in 1970 as a reporter and host of "The Noon Show". He worked there for 10 years, until 1980. While at KHQ he also had evening weather duties. He worked at WKRC-TV in Cincinnati, Ohio between 1980 and 1983. While there, he was a weather reporter and co-host of PM Magazine. He also worked at WKRC radio as a commentator. From 1983 to 1985, Fisher served as a weatherman and feature reporter at WABC in New York City; during this time, he also worked on Live with Regis and Kathie Lee.

Fisher returned to WKRC-TV from 1985 to 1989, where he hosted The Ira Joe Fisher Show, a daily talk/variety show; he won two regional Emmy Awards for his writing at WKRC. From 1989 to 1995, he served as a weather and feature reporter on WNBC-TV in New York City. In 1995, he moved to WCBS where he remained until 2003. At different times during his tenure there, he served as the weather anchor for every one of the station's newscasts.

Fisher left WCBS in 2003. After that, he appeared on the CBS News Saturday Early Show and as a voiceover artist for the CBS Morning News and The Early Show until 2007.
