= Matthew Klein (writer) =

American author

Matthew Klein is an American author of suspense novels and a software entrepreneur. His novels are set in and around Silicon Valley.

== Background ==
Klein was born in New York City, and moved to Westchester County, New York when he was in eight years old. During high school, he attended Horace Mann School in New York City. He graduated from Yale University in 1990. He attended Stanford Graduate School of Business (class of 1996) but dropped out of school to run his first software startup company, Release Software, in 1996.

== Bibliography ==
1. Switchback (2006), ISBN 0752874098
2. Con Ed (2007), ISBN 0446579556
3. No Way Back (2015), ISBN 1605987018

== Critical reception of novels ==
Switchback, which was a mixture of psychological suspense and science fiction, met with mixed critical reception (Booklist gave it a starred review and called it "fine little genre-bending adventure," but Publishers Weekly called it "less than credible."). Nevertheless, it was nominated for the 2007 Best First Novel award by the International Thriller Writers association. Con Ed, which was the second novel that Klein wrote (but in some countries was published before Switchback), was generally critically praised. Its review in The New York Times called it: "funny, full of tricks and very, very hard to put down."

== Career as software entrepreneur ==
Klein founded several software companies in Silicon Valley in the late 1990s. These included Release Software Corporation and TechPlanet. He also started Generation X Software, which released the Macintosh shareware program Guy Friday.
