= Alfred S. Posamentier =

American academic (born 1942)

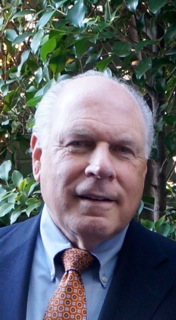
Alfred S. Posamentier

Alfred S. Posamentier (born October 18, 1942) is an American educator and a lead commentator on American math and science education, regularly contributing to The New York Times and other news publications. He has created original math and science curricula, emphasized the need for increased math and science funding, promulgated criteria by which to select math and science educators, advocated the importance of involving parents in K-12 math and science education, and provided myriad curricular solutions for teaching critical thinking in math.

Dr. Posamentier was a member of the New York State Education Commissioner's Blue Ribbon Panel on the Math-A Regents Exams. He served on the Commissioner's Mathematics Standards Committee, which redefined the Standards for New York State. And he served on the New York City schools’ Chancellor's Math Advisory Panel.

Posamentier earned a Ph.D. in mathematics education from Fordham University (1973), a master's degree in mathematics education from the City College of the City University of New York (1966) and an A.B. degree in mathematics from Hunter College of the City University of New York.

== Life ==
Posamentier was born in Manhattan in New York City, the son of Austrian immigrants. He has one daughter (Lisa Joan Perlman, born in 1970), and one son (David Richard Posamentier, born in 1978). He resides in River Vale, New Jersey. He is professor emeritus of mathematics education and former dean of the School of Education at The City College of the City University of New York, where he spent over 40 years. For the next five years, he was Dean of the School of Education and professor of mathematics education at Mercy University, New York. Dr. Posamentier then was invited to take on the position of Executive Director for Internationalization and Funded Programs at Long Island University, New York. After three years at LIU, he took on his most recent position as Distinguished Lecturer at The New York City College of Technology/City University of New York. He began his career as a mathematics teacher for six years at Theodore Roosevelt High School (Bronx, New York).

== Awards and honors ==
In 1989, Posamentier was made an Honorary Fellow at the London South Bank University (London, England). In recognition of his outstanding teaching, the City College Alumni Association named him Educator of the Year in 1994, and in 2009 New York City had the day, May 1, 1994, named in his honor by the President of the New York City Council. In 1994, he was also awarded the Grand Medal of Honor from the Republic of Austria, and in 1999, upon approval of Parliament, the President of the Republic of Austria awarded him the title of University Professor of Austria. In 2003 he was awarded the title of Ehrenbürger fellowship of the Vienna University of Technology, and in 2004 was awarded the Austrian Cross of Honor for Science and Art, 1st class from the President of the Republic of Austria. In 2005 he was inducted into the Hunter College Alumni Hall of Fame, and in 2006 he was awarded the prestigious Townsend Harris Medal by the City College Alumni Association. In 2009, he was inducted into the New York State Mathematics Educators Hall of Fame, and also that year he was awarded the Christian Peter Beuth Prize in Berlin, Germany. In 2017 he was awarded Summa Cum Laude nemine discrepante from the Fundacion Sebastian, A. C. in Mexico City.

== Publications ==
Dr. Posamentier is the editor of the book series, Problem Solving in Mathematics and Beyond, which demonstrates the power and beauty of mathematics through clever problem-solving experiences. He has also authored or co-authored over 90 books, including:

Books'

- Mathematik: Arbeitsmaterialien (Klett, 1994)
- The Art of Problem Solving: A Resource for the Mathematics Teacher (Corwin, 1995)
- Challenging Problems in Algebra (Dover, 1996)
- Challenging Problems in Geometry (Dover, 1996)
- Tips for the Mathematics Teacher: Research-Based Strategies to Help Students Learn (Corwin, 1998)
- Advanced Euclidean Geometry (Wiley, 2002)
- Math Wonders: To Inspire Teachers and Students (ASCD, 2003)
- Math Charmers: Tantalizing Tidbits for the Mind (Prometheus Books, 2003)
- Pi: A Biography of the World's Most Mysterious Number (Prometheus Books, 2004)
- Progress in Mathematics: K-9 textbook series of 11 books (Sadlier-Oxford, 2006-2009)
- 101+ Great Ideas to Introduce Key Concepts in Mathematics (Corwin, 2006)
- What successful Math Teacher Do: Grades 6-12 (Corwin 2006, 2013)
- What successful Math Teacher Do: Grades K-5 (Corwin 2007)
- Exemplary Practices for Secondary Math Teachers (ASCD, 2007)
- The Fabulous Fibonacci Numbers (Prometheus Books, 2007, 2011)
- Problem-Solving Strategies for Efficient and Elegant Solutions, Grades 6-12 (Corwin, 2008)
- Problem Solving in Mathematics: Grades 3-6: Powerful Strategies to Deepen Understanding (Corwin, 2009)
- Mathematical Amazements and Surprises: Fascinating Figures and Noteworthy Numbers (Prometheus, 2009)
- The Pythagorean Theorem: Its Power and Glory (Prometheus, 2010)
- The Glorious Golden Ratio (Prometheus, 2012)
- The Art of Motivating Students for Mathematics Instructions (McGraw-Hill, 2012)
- The Secrets of Triangles (with Ingmar Lehmann, Prometheus, 2012)
- 100 commonly Asked Questions in Math Class (Corwin, 2013)
- Magnificent Mistakes in Mathematics (Prometheus, 2013)
- Geometry: Its Elements and Structure (Dover. 2014)
- Mathematisches Woerterbuch - English-Deutsch (Veritas, 2014)
- Mathematical Curiosities: A Treasure Trove of Unexpected Entertainments (Prometheus, 2014)
- Teaching Secondary School Mathematics: Techniques and Enrichment Units (Ninth Edition, Pearson, 2015
- Problem-Solving Strategies in Mathematics (World Scientific, 2015)
- Numbers: Their Tales, Types and Treasures (Prometheus Books, 2015)
- Effective Techniques to Motivate Mathematics instruction (Routledge, 2016
- The Circle: A Mathematical Exploration Beyond the Line (Prometheus Books, 2016)
- Strategy Games to Enhance Problem-solving Ability in Mathematics (World Scientific, 2017)
- The Joy of Mathematics: Marvels, Novelties, and Neglected Gems That Are Rarely Taught in Math Class (Prometheus Books, 2017)
- The Mathematics of Everyday Life, (Prometheus Books, 2018)
- The Mathematics Coach Handbook (World Scientific, 2019)
- Tools to Help Your Children Learn Math: Strategies, Curiosities, and Stories to make Math Fun for parents and Children (World Scientific, 2019)
- Solving Problems in Our Spatial World (World Scientific, 2019)
- The Psychology of Problem Solving: The Background to Successful Mathematics Thinking (World Scientific, 2020)
- Math Makers: The Lives and Works of 50 Famous Mathematicians (Prometheus Books, 2020)
- Understanding Mathematics Through Problem-Solving (World Scientific, 2020)
- The Joy of Geometry (Prometheus Books, 2021)
- Teaching Secondary School Mathematics: Techniques and Enrichment -10th Edition (World Scientific, 2021)
- Mathematics Entertainment for the Millions (World Scientific, 2020)
- Innovative Teaching: Best Practices from Business and Beyond for Mathematics Teachers (World Scientific, 2021)
- Math Tricks: the surprising wonders of shapes and numbers (Prometheus Books, 2021)
- Creative Secondary School Mathematics: 125 enrichment units for grades 7 to 12 (World Scientific, 2021)
- Geometry in Our Three-Dimensional World (World Scientific, 2022)
- Mathematics: Its Historical Aspects, Wonders, and Beyond (World Scientific, 2022)
- The Secrets Lives of Numbers: Numerals and Their Peculiarities in Mathematics and Beyond (Prometheus Books, 2022)
- Sharpening Everyday Mental/Thinking Skills Through Mathematics Problem Solving and Beyond (World Scientific, 2024)
- Geometric Gems: An Appreciation for Geometric Curiosities-- Volume 1: The Wonders of Triangles(World Scientific, 2024)
- Geometric Gems: An Appreciation for Geometric Curiosities-- Volume 2: The Wonders of Quadrilaterals (World Scientific, 2025)
- Geometric Gems: An Appreciation for Geometric Curiosities-- Volume 3: The Wonders of Circles (World Scientific, 2025)
- Mathematics in Architecture, Art, Nature, and Beyond (World Scientific, 2025)
- Fun Math: Problem Solving Beyond the Classroom (World Scientific, 2025)
- Appreciating Geometry Through Extraordinary Relationships (World Scientific, 2026)
- Maxima and Minima: How Extremes Can Explain Mathematics Concepts and Facilitate Problem Solving (World Scientific, 2026)
- Revolutions in Mathematics (World Scientific, 2026)
- How to Generate a Genuine Love of Mathematics (World Scientific, 2026)
- Surprising Geometric Solutions: A Projective Geometry Approach (World Scientific, 2026)

Articles: (after 1975)

Refereed Journals:

- “Nine Strategies for Motivating Students in Mathematics” Edutopia, June 2017.
- “Leadership in Mathematics Education: Roles and Responsibilities” Journal of Mathematics Education at Teachers College, Spring-Summer 2013, Vol. 4.
- “More Gems from Euclidean Geometry” Mathematics Teacher, Vol. 103, No. 3, Oct. 2009, pp. 221-226.
- “Motivating Middle-School Students: The Critical Part of Lesson Planning in Mathematics” Sadlier Professional Development Series. Vol. 12, 2009.
- “Enhancing Plane Euclidean Geometry with Three-dimensional Analogs” Mathematics Teacher, Vol. 102, No. 5, Dec. 2008/Jan. 2009, pp. 394 – 398.
- “Motivating Teachers to Use Mathematics”, (co-author D. Jaye) Principal Leadership, Vol. 7, No. 5, Jan. 2007, pp. 46-50.
- “Trisecting the Circle: A Case for Euclidean Geometry” Mathematics Teacher (NCTM) Vol. 99, No. 6, Feb. 2006, pp. 414-418.
- “How the Nation’s Largest City is Managing one of Its Severest Math Teacher Shortages” (Co-author: J. Coppin) Mathematics Teacher (NCTM) Vol. 98, No. 9, May 2005, pp. 582-584
- “Illustrating Unexpected Answers” Reader Reflections, Mathematics Teacher (NCTM) Vol. 97, No. 4, April 2004, pp. 242 & 256.
- “Marvelous Math!” Education Leadership – ASCD, Vol. 61, No. 5, Feb. 2004, pp. 44-47.
- "Die Nutzung von neueren Problemlösungsstrategien im Mathematikunterricht", Mathematiklehren, Friedrich/Klett Verlag, Vol. 58, June 1993, pp. 68-70.
- "Motivation im Mathematikunterricht: Eine vernachlässigte Kunst", Mathematiklehren, Friedrich/Klett Verlag, Vol. 50, Feb. 1992, pp. 6-11.
- "Aus der Geschichte von ”, SPECTRUM: Berliner Journal für den Wissenschaftler, June 1991, p. 8.
- "Was Lange Währt...”, interview SPECTRUM: Berliner Journal für den Wissenschaftler, June 1991, pp. 6-7.
- "Geometry: A Remedy for the Malaise of Middle School Mathematics", The Mathematics Teacher, Vol. 82, No. 9, Dec. 1989, pp. 678-680.
- "An Astounding Revelation on the History of ”, (co-author: N. Gordon) The Mathematics Teacher, Vol. 77, No. 1, Jan. 1984, p. 52.
- "A Shortage of Mathematics Teachers in New York City" (co-author J. Stepelman) The Mathematics Teacher, Vol. 75, No. 7, Oct. 1982, pp. 588-590.
- "Trisection Points on the Cardioid Envelope" (co-author P. Catranides) New York State Mathematics Teachers' Journal, Vol. 28, No. 2, Spring/ Summer, 1978, pp. 106-108.
- "The Neglected Mean", School Science and Mathematics, Vol. LXXVII, No. 4, April 1977, pp. 339-344.
- "Summing a Finite Series - A Useful Technique for the High School Teacher" School Science and Mathematics, Vol. LXXV, No. 6, Oct. 1975, pp. 555-560.
- Book Chapters:
- “Mathematics Instruction in the United States – Challenges, Introspection, and Solutions” Interdisciplinary Approaches Toward Enhancing Teacher Education (M. Dolores Ramirez-Verdugo, Bahar Otcu-Grillman, Eds.) Hershey, PA: IGI Global, 2021.
- “The Rejuvenation of a Professional School in the United States” Universities in Change: Managing Higher Education Institutions in the Age of Globalization (Andreas Altmann, Bernd Ebersberger, Eds.) New York: Springer, 2013.
- “Mathematics Instruction in the United States: Challenges, Solutions, Introspection” Perspespektiven der PaedagogInnenbildung in Oesterreich (Gabriele Boeheim-Galehr and Ruth Allggaeuer, Eds.) Vienna, Austria: Studien Verlag, 2012, pp. 87-92.
- “A History of Video Conferencing at the City University of New York” Chapter in Networking Entities (Johann Günther and Gregory Zeibekakis, eds.) Donau-Universität Press, Krems, Austria 1999, pp. 11-12.
- “Using Telecommunications to Enhance Educational Experiences” (Co-author S. Gersh) chapter in Education in the Age of Information: The Challenge of Technology (Carl Payne, Editor), The Fulbright Commission/Manchester University Press, 1993, pp. 81-94.
- "The Harmonic Mean and its Place among Means”, chapter in Enrichment Topics for Secondary School Mathematics, Reston, VA: National Council of Teachers of Mathematics, 1988, pp. 215-224.
- "Techniques of Motivation in Teaching Geometry", McGraw-Hill Monographs in Mathematics Education, 1975

Op-Ed Articles:

- “Making Math Fun Again: Curious Conclusions can Become Lures for learning" Op-Ed, The Record, Sept. 16, 2018.
- “Pi pops up all over the place on Pi Day” Op-Ed, Journal News, March 15, 2018
- “Keep the SAT Math Section About Math” Op-Ed, Journal News, Aug. 17, 2016
- “Get rid of superintendent Salary Cap” Op-Ed, The Record, Nov. 15, 2015
- “How to make math students more receptive learners” Op-Ed, The Record, May 3, 2015.
- “Understanding tomorrow’s special piece of pi”, The Record, March 13, 2015
- “Math Teachers Need More Time, Training” Op-Ed, Journal News, Jan. 8, 2015
- “Let Teachers Lead Way” Op-Ed, Rochester Democrat and Chronicle, Nov. 23, 2014
- "View: Ease kids back into the swing of school, without ruining summer” Op-Ed, Journal News, July 13, 2014.
- “Don’t Cut Fulbright Funding” Op-Ed, The Record, June 22, 2014.
- “Fulbright scholarships foster spirit of global unity” Op-Ed, Journal News, June 22, 2014.
- “Familie ist der vernachlässigtste Teil in der Schule” Interview Der Standard, March 28, 2014.
- “New York relies on new, flawed, teacher exam” Op-Ed, Journal News, March 29, 2014.
- “Posamentier: Flawed way to assess new teachers” Op-Ed, New York Newsday, March 25, 2014.
- “Common Core adds opportunities for better mathematics instruction” Op-Ed, Journal News, Feb. 23, 2014.
- “Non-stop Testing Hinders Learning” Op-Ed, Journal News, Oct. 24, 2013.
- “Teach to the Culture, Not to the Test” Op-Ed, New York Newsday, Dec. 27, 2012.
- “Explore New Ways to Teach Math, “not to the Test”, Journal News, Sept. 25, 2012.
- “Teaching ‘to the test’ just doesn’t add up” Bergen Record, Sept. 13, 2012.
- “Setting the Course for a Leading School of Education: Meeting the Challenge of Training Teachers” College: Planning and Management, Aug. 2012
- “How Parents Can Further Their Children’s Success in Mathematics” HowTo Learn.Com, Aug. 13, 2012
- “Strength in Numbers: Recruiting Fibonacci” Bergen Record, Feb. 16, 2012.
- “Focus on Tests Ignores Creativity to Enliven Math” Op-Ed, Journal News, Jan. 29, 2012
- “Does more technology = more learning?" Op-Ed, Daily Record, NJ, Sept. 24, 2011
- “Let’s Conquer Math Anxiety” Op-Ed, New York Newsday, Sept. 9, 2011
- “A look at a way to create a fair teacher evaluation system” Op-Ed, Journal News, June 25, 2011
- “Testing students to grade teachers encourages cheating” Op-Ed, Daily Record (New Jersey) July 29, 2011
- “Achievement gap can be closed with the proper remedies” Op-Ed, Journal News, Sept. 5, 2010.
- “Don’t’ Drop the Exams, Improve Them” Op-Ed, New York Newsday, March 11, 2010.
- “Formula for higher U.S. Math Scores” Op-Ed, New York Newsday, Nov. 1, 2009.
- “Financial Carrots: Beware the Hidden Costs” CSA News, Vol. 42, No. 1, Sept. 2008
- “Math Wars: Why Abandoning Tradition doesn’t add up” Op-Ed, The Record (Bergen County, NJ), June 11, 2008.
- “Pension Waivers not Always Essential” Op-Ed, New York Newsday, June 4, 2008
- “Teacher training needs attention from policy-makers”, Buffalo News, May 12, 2008.
- “State’s return to geometry requires teacher preparation”, Buffalo News, Feb. 23, 2008.
- “New York City’s Schools Need Math Experts – Not Zeros”, New York Daily News, Sept. 27, 2007.
- “AP Math Class Should be Dropped” Op-Ed, New York Newsday, Sept. 10, 2007
- “Raise the Pay Grade” Op-Ed, New York Times, Vol. CLVI, No. 54,062, Sept. 9, 2007.
- “Standards Aid CUNY Students” Op-Ed, The New York Post, Aug. 20, 2007
- “A Formula to End the Divide” Op-Ed, The Record (NJ), June 19, 2007
- “Der Mann, der mit den Zahlen spielte” Wiener Zeitung (Vienna, Austria), April 14, 2007
- “The Mozart of Mathematics” Op-Ed, The Record (Bergen County, NJ) Vol. 112, No. 312, April 12, 2007.
- “His Work Equated to Genius” Op-Ed, New York Newsday, April 8, 2007
- “Math Wars: Enlightened Path is Between the Two Sides”, The Reporter (Vacaville, CA), Dec. 17, 2006
- “Math Wars: MiddlePath”, Trenton Times, Dec. 1, 2006
- “Analysis of High School Minority Enrollments” (Coppin-Gordon) Education Update, Vol. XII, No. 2, Oct. 2006
- “Problem Solving Matters” The Venture County Star, Oct. 8, 2006
- “Put drilling out and thinking in: Math students don't learn enough about ways to approach problems that would simplify their work”, New York Newsday, Sept. 26, 2006
- “Math is fun, but do teachers know that?”, TherenJou=am The Blade, Toledo, Ohio, Sept. 2, 2006
- “Math demystified: Applying the real ‘real world’ to mathematics” The Times of Trenton (NJ), Aug. 22, 2006
- “Do the math – if teachers think it’s fun, so will the kids”, The Baltimore Sun, Aug. 22, 2006
- “Love Numbers: Parents can help their children by helping them see patterns and the beauty of mathematics”, The Philadelphia Inquirer, Vol. 176, No. 6, June 6, 2006.
- “In Choosing Colleges, Families Should Consider the Quality of Instruction” (Coauthor: Z. Dagan) Op-Ed, The Buffalo News, April 9, 2006.
- “If math is going to get more popular, it needs a P.R. campaign”, The Buffalo News, Feb. 26, 2006.
- “A formula to bring the thrill back to math”, The Record (Bergen County, N.J.), Dec. 12, 2005
- “A New Approach to Make Bilingual Education More Meaningful” Op-Ed, The Buffalo News, Sept. 18, 2005.
- “Pay More for Math” Op-Ed, New York Times, Vol. CLIV, No. 53,187, April 17, 2005.
- “Updated Math Program will Prepare Students for Future” Op-Ed, The Buffalo News, March 16, 2005.
- “Why We Need to Study Math” Op-Ed, The Buffalo News, Jan. 23, 2005.
- “Problem Solving in Math Education” CSA NEWS NYC: Council of Supervisors and Administrators, Vol. 38, No. 4, Dec. 2004.
- “The Importance of Retention” CSA NEWS New York Council of Supervisors and Administrators, Vol. 38, No. 1, Sept. 2004.
- “Students Must Count on Problem-Solving Skills”, Op-Ed, Newsday New York City, July 20, 2004
- “Bold Steps Needed to Attract, Retain Excellent Math Teachers” Op-Ed, The Buffalo News, June 9, 2004.
- “On Feb. 29, and Other Timely Oddities” Op-Ed, The Record (Bergen County, N.J.), Feb. 29, 2004.
- “Raise the Status of the Teaching Profession” Op-Ed, Newsday New York City, Feb. 24, 2004
- “Fine-Tuning School Test Laws” Op-Ed, The New York Sun, Vol. 119, No. 215, Feb. 19, 2004
- “A Call for Master Teachers” Op-Ed, The New York Sun, Vol. 119, No. 153, Nov. 19, 2003.
- “Teaching Math Skills Starts with the Principals” Op-Ed, Newsday New York City, Nov. 11, 2003.
- “We must Add More to Math Teachers” Op-Ed, Newsday-New York City, Oct. 9, 2003.
- “Grade the Teachers” Op-Ed, New York Times, Vol. CLII, No. 52,505, June 5, 2003.
- “Klein’s Newest Math Crisis” Op-Ed, New York Post, May 9, 2003.
- “Math Teachers Don’t Add Up” Op-Ed, New York Post, March 15, 2003.
- “Give our Public Colleges a Level Playing Field” Op-Ed, Newsday-New York City, Feb. 28, 2003.
- “Math With Meaning” Op-Ed, The New York Sun, Jan. 23, 2003
- “Birthdays, Math, and Probability” Op-Ed, The Record (Bergen County, N.J.), Oct. 18, 2002.
- “Math Scores Call for Cross-Curriculum Effort” Op-Ed, Newsday-New York City, Sept. 19, 2002.
- “A Mathematics Crisis in the Schools Threatens our World Leadership” Op-Ed, The New York Sun, Aug. 27, 2002.
- “Math Teachers Who Almost Took Math” Op-Ed, New York Times, Vol. CLI, No. 52,115, May 11, 2002.
- “Madam, I’m 2002 – a Numerically Beautiful Year” Op-Ed, New York Times, Vol. CLI, No. 51,986, Jan. 2, 2002.
- “A Tale of Two Cities: CUNY Initiates Video Contact with Vienna” CUNY Matters, Summer 1995
