= Four Freedoms Award =

Annual award presented by Roosevelt Institute and Roosevelt Stichting

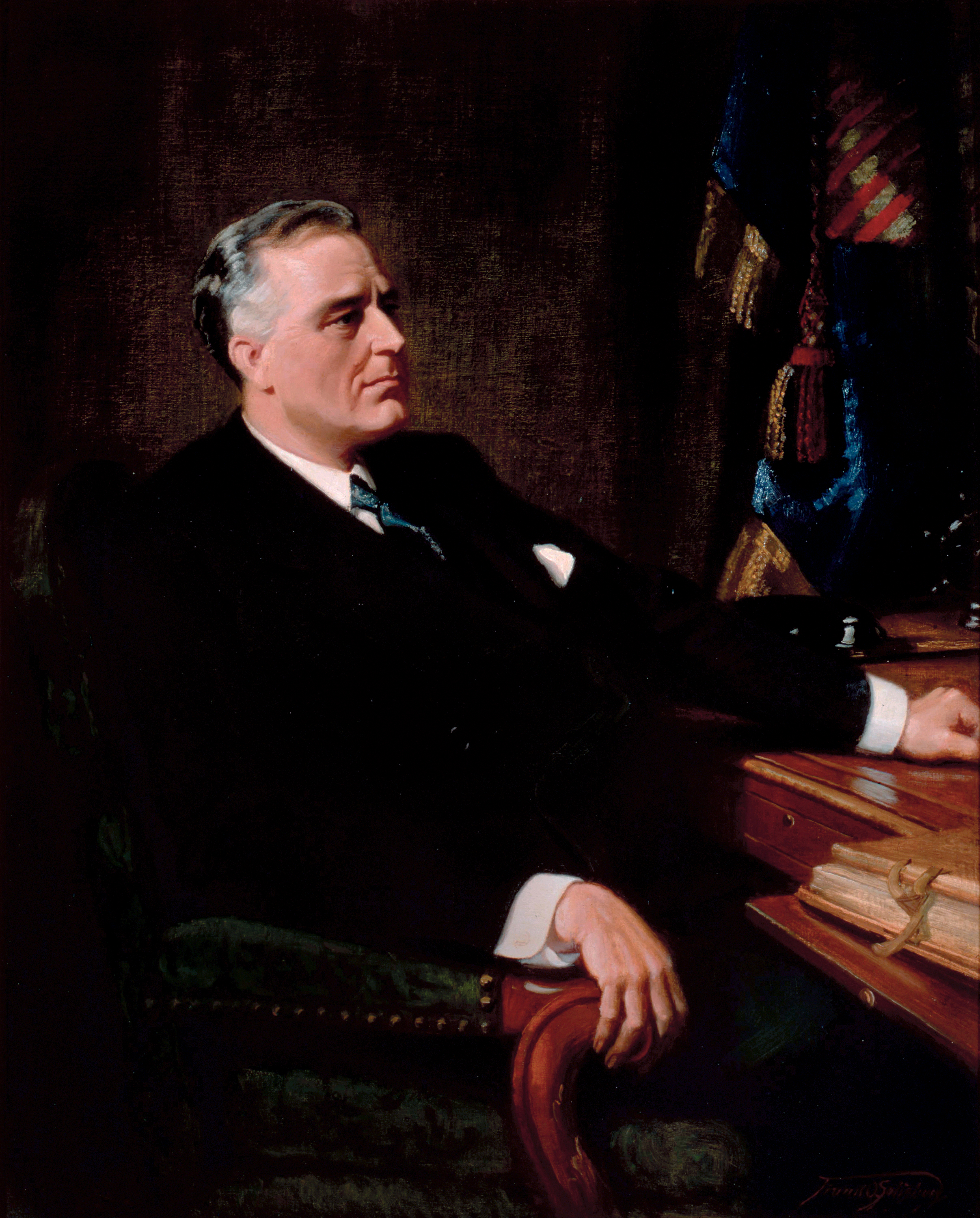
- President Franklin D. Roosevelt, painted by Francis Owen Salisbury, 1947
- Country: United States
- Established: 1982
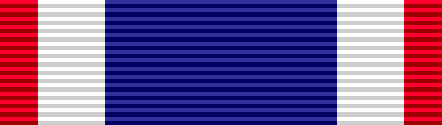
- Ribbon of the award

The Four Freedoms Award is an annual award presented to "those men and women whose achievements have demonstrated a commitment to those principles which US President Franklin D. Roosevelt proclaimed in his Four Freedoms speech to the United States Congress on January 6, 1941, as essential to democracy: "freedom of speech and expression, freedom of worship, freedom from want, freedom from fear". The annual award is handed out in alternate years in New York City by the Roosevelt Institute to Americans and in Middelburg, Netherlands, by the Roosevelt Stichting to non-Americans.

== History ==
State of the Union (Four Freedoms) (January 6, 1941)
Franklin D. Roosevelt's January 6, 1941 State of the Union Address introducing the theme of the Four Freedoms (starting at 32:02)

The awards were first presented in 1982 on the centennial of President Roosevelt's birth as well as the bicentennial of diplomatic relations between the United States and the Netherlands. The awards were founded to celebrate the Four Freedoms espoused by President Roosevelt in his speech:

1. Freedom of speech
2. Freedom of worship
3. Freedom from want
4. Freedom from fear

For each of the four freedoms, an award was instituted, as well as a special Freedom medal. In 1990, 1995, 2003, and 2004, there were also special awards.

In odd years, the awards are presented to American citizens or institutions by the Franklin and Eleanor Roosevelt Institute in New York City, though in the past, the American awards were given in Hyde Park, New York. In even years, the award ceremony is held in Middelburg and honors non-Americans. The choice of Middelburg was motivated by the suspected descent of the family Roosevelt from Oud-Vossemeer in the municipality Tholen.

== Laureates ==
=== Freedom Medal ===
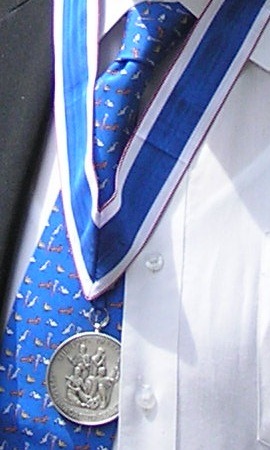
One of the medals

| Year | Middelburg | Photo | Year | Hyde Park | Photo |
|---|---|---|---|---|---|
| 1982 | Princess Juliana of the Netherlands | | 1983 | W. Averell Harriman | |
| 1984 | Harold Macmillan | | 1985 | Claude Pepper | |
| 1986 | Alessandro Pertini | | 1987 | Thomas P. O'Neill, Jr. | |
| 1988 | Helmut Schmidt | | 1989 | William J. Brennan, Jr. | |
| 1990 | Václav Havel and Jacques Delors | | 1991 | Thurgood Marshall | |
| 1992 | Javier Pérez de Cuéllar | | 1993 | Cyrus Vance | |
| 1994 | Dalai Lama | | 1995 | Jimmy Carter | |
| 1996 | Juan Carlos I of Spain | | 1997 | Katharine Meyer Graham | |
| 1998 | Mary Robinson | | 1999 | Edward M. Kennedy | |
| 2000 | Martti Ahtisaari | | 2001 | W.W. II veterans as represented by: Richard Winters (U.S. Army); Robert Eugene Bush (U.S. Navy); William T. Ketcham (U.S. Marine Corps); Lee A. Archer, Jr. (U.S. Air Force); Ellen Buckley (U.S. Navy Nurse Corps) | |
| 2002 | Nelson Mandela | | 2003 | George J. Mitchell | |
| 2004 | Kofi Annan | | 2005 | Bill Clinton | |
| 2006 | Mohamed ElBaradei | | 2007 | Carl Levin and Richard Lugar | |
| 2008 | Richard von Weizsäcker | | 2009 | Hillary Clinton | |
| 2010 | European Court of Human Rights | | 2011 | Russ Feingold | |
| 2012 | Luiz Inácio Lula da Silva | | 2013 | Wendell Berry | |
| 2014 | Red Cross | | 2015 | Ruth Bader Ginsburg | |
| 2016 | Angela Merkel | | 2017 | Harry Belafonte | |
| 2018 | Christiana Figueres as representative of the Paris Climate Agreement | | 2019 | Lonnie Bunch | |
| 2020 | United Nations | | 2021 | Fred Korematsu | |
| 2022 | Sviatlana Tsikhanouskaya | | 2023 | Nancy Pelosi | |
| 2024 | Save Ukraine | | 2025 | Darren Walker | |
| 2026 | Volodymyr Zelenskyy and the Ukrainian people | | 2027 | | |

=== Freedom of Speech ===
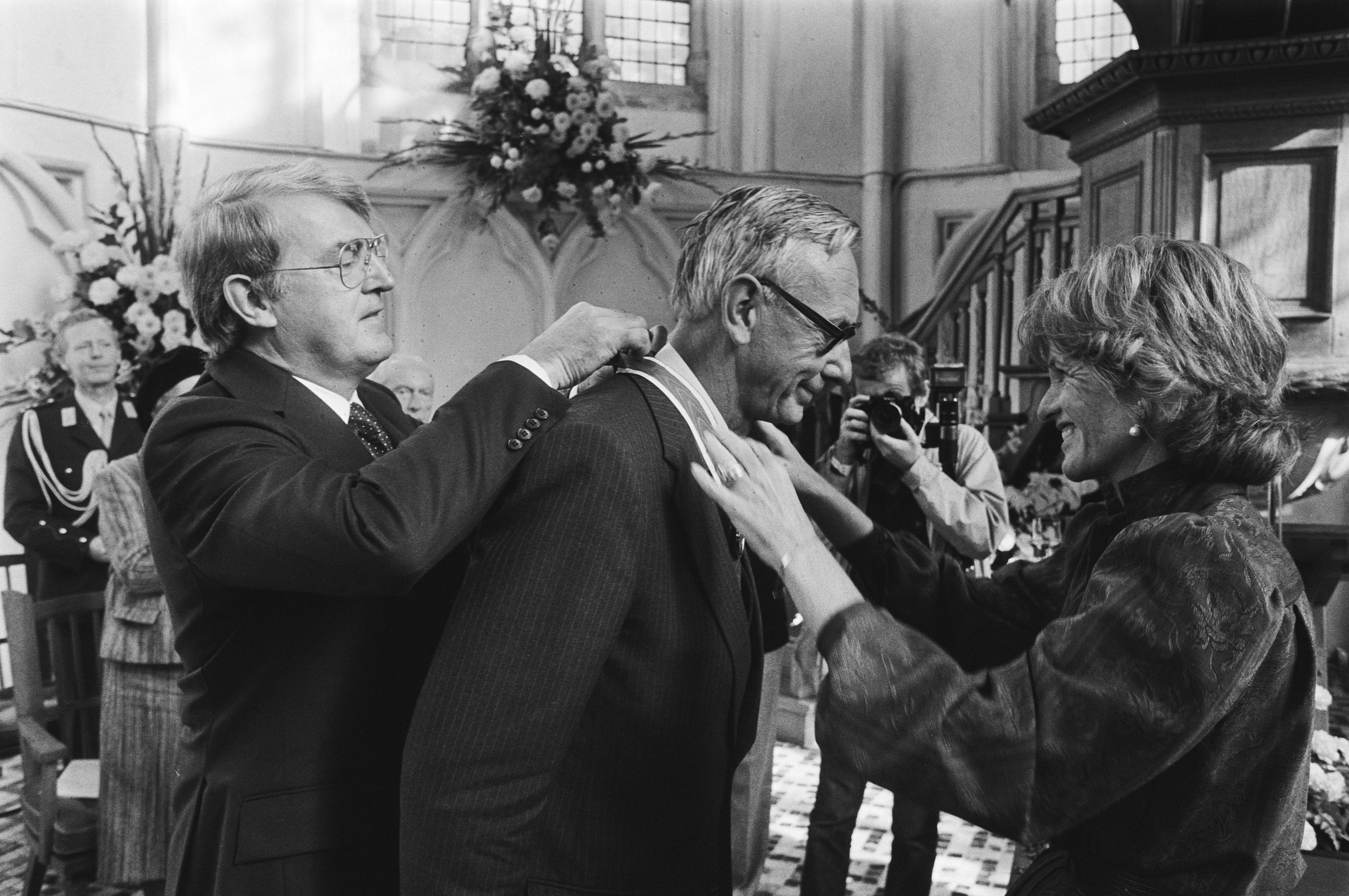
Dutch politician Max van der Stoel receives the Freedom of Speech award, 16 October 1982

The first is freedom of speech and expression — everywhere in the world.

— Roosevelt, January 6, 1941

| Year | Middelburg | Year | Hyde Park |
|---|---|---|---|
| 1982 | Max van der Stoel | 1983 | Joseph L. Rauh, Jr. |
| 1984 | Amnesty International | 1985 | Kenneth B. Clark |
| 1986 | El País | 1987 | Herbert Block |
| 1988 | Ellen Johnson Sirleaf | 1989 | Walter Cronkite |
| 1990 | No Award | 1991 | James Reston |
| 1992 | Mstislav Rostropovich | 1993 | Arthur Miller |
| 1994 | Marion Dönhoff | 1995 | Mary McGrory |
| 1996 | John Hume | 1997 | Sidney R. Yates |
| 1998 | CNN | 1999 | John Lewis |
| 2000 | Bronisław Geremek | 2001 | The New York Times and the Ochs/Sulzberger Family |
| 2002 | Radio Free Europe/Radio Liberty | 2003 | Studs Terkel |
| 2004 | Lennart Meri | 2005 | Tom Brokaw |
| 2006 | Carlos Fuentes | 2007 | Bill Moyers |
| 2008 | Lakhdar Brahimi | 2009 | Anthony Romero |
| 2010 | Novaya Gazeta | 2011 | Michael J. Copps |
| 2012 | Al Jazeera | 2013 | Paul Krugman |
| 2014 | Maryam Durani | 2015 | Arthur Mitchell |
| 2016 | Mazen Darwish | 2017 | Dan Rather |
| 2018 | Erol Önderoğlu | 2019 | The Boston Globe |
| 2020 | Maria Ressa | 2021 | Nikole Hannah-Jones |
| 2022 | Đỗ Nguyễn Mai Khôi | 2023 | Tracie Hall |
| 2024 | Bellingcat | 2025 | Teen Vogue |
| 2026 | Committee to Protect Journalists | 2027 | |

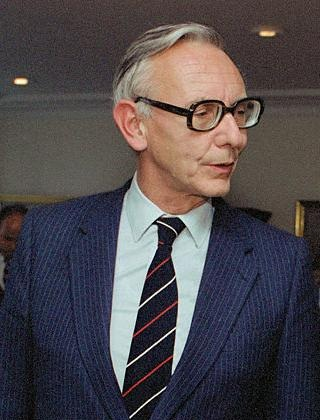
M. vd Stoel 1982

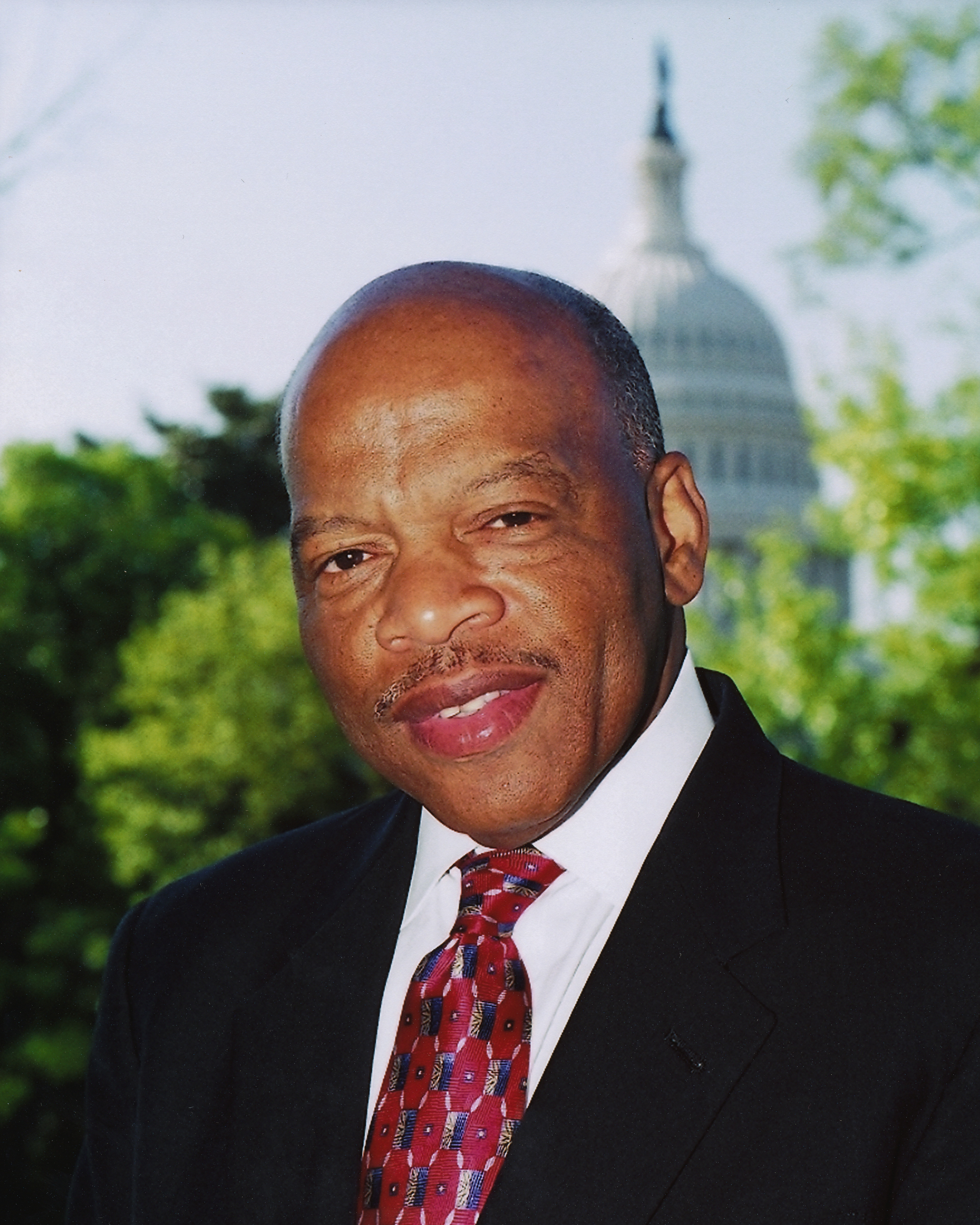
J. Lewis 1999

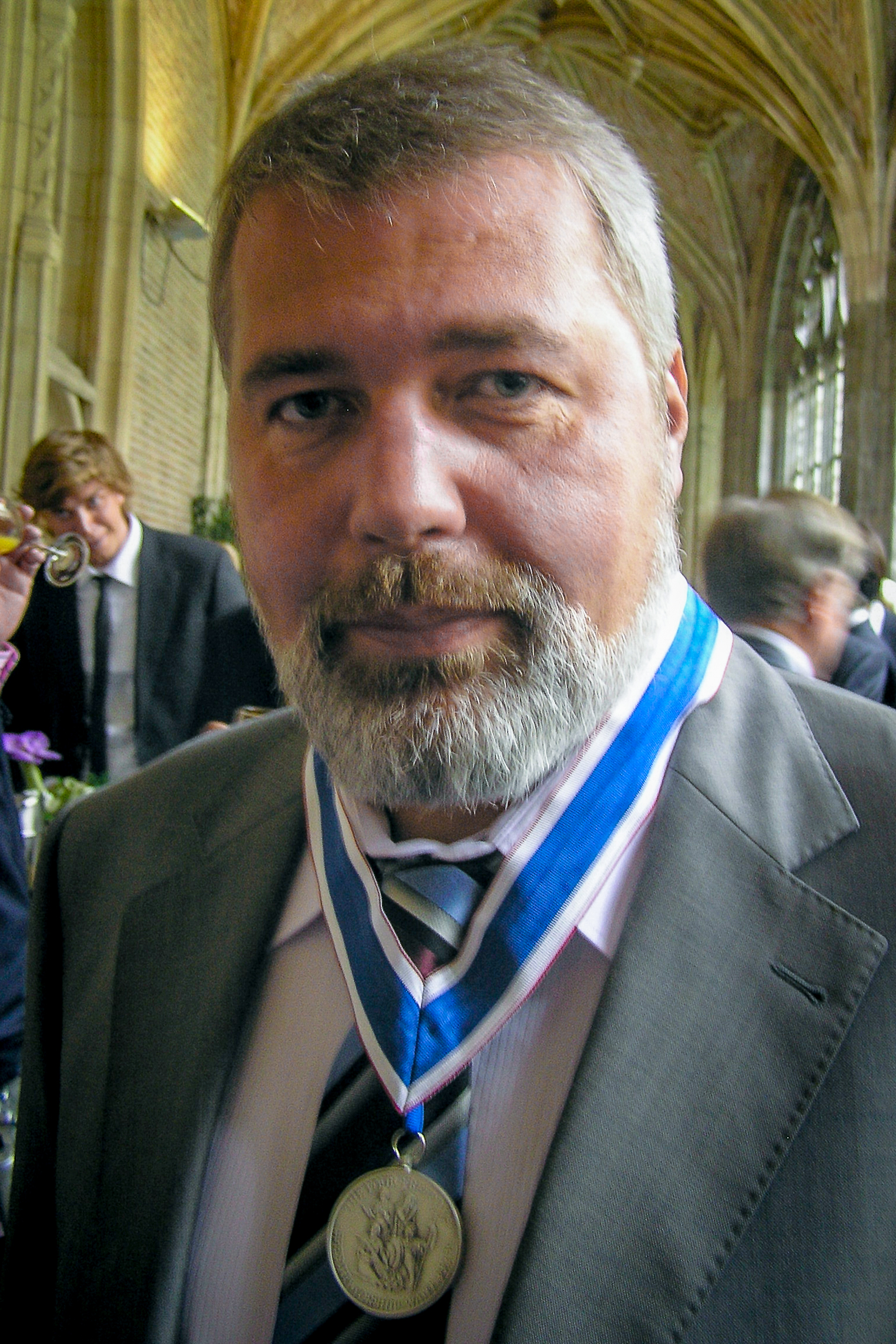
Dmitry Muratov on behalf of Novaya Gazeta 2010

=== Freedom of Worship ===
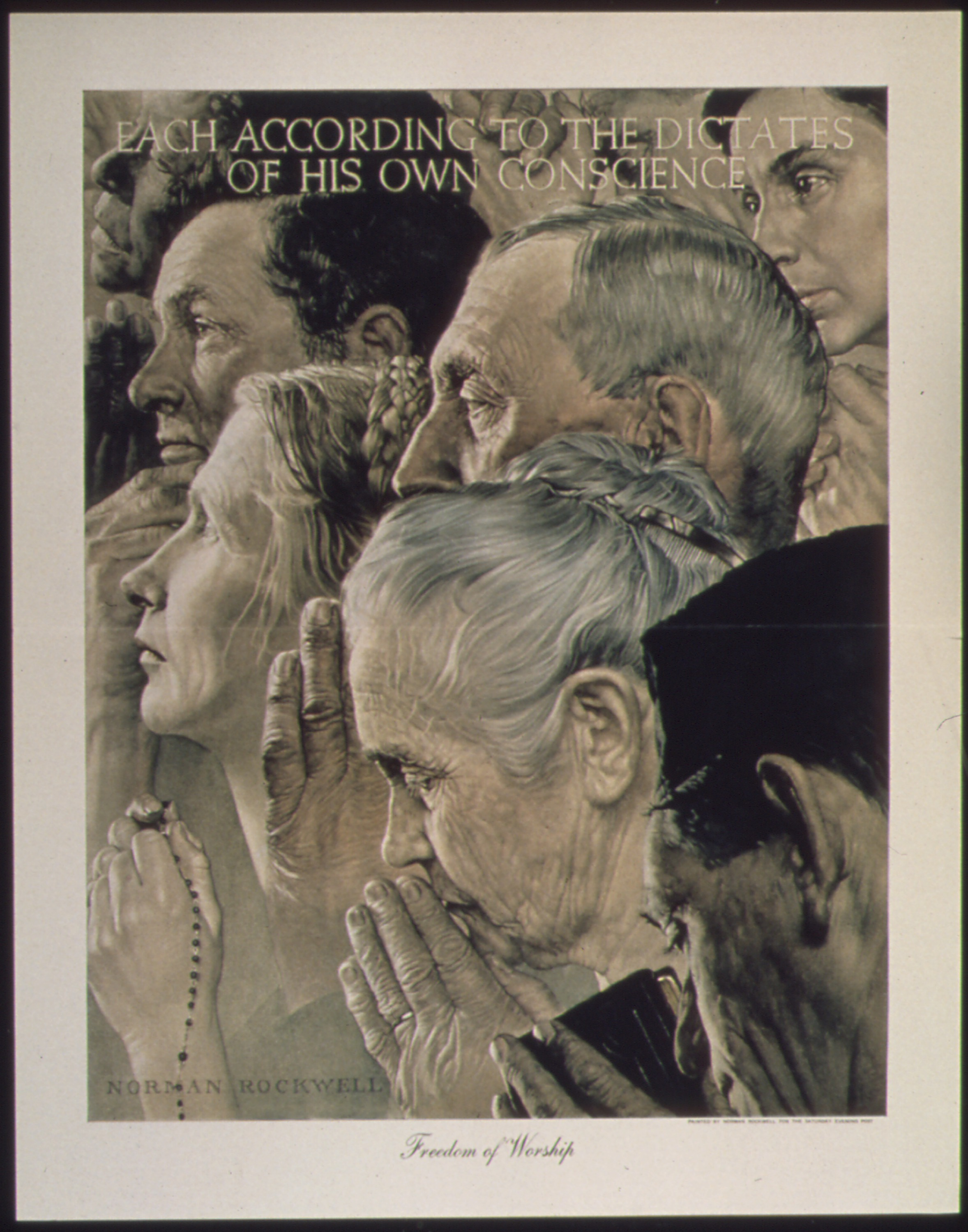
Freedom of Worship, a painting of Norman Rockwell of 1943

The second is freedom of every person to worship God in his own way — everywhere in the world.

— Roosevelt, January 6, 1941

| Year | Middelburg | Year | Hyde Park |
|---|---|---|---|
| 1982 | Willem A. Visser 't Hooft | 1983 | Coretta Scott King |
| 1984 | Werner Leich and Christiann F. Beyers Naudé | 1985 | Elie Wiesel |
| 1986 | Bernardus Alfrink | 1987 | Leon Sullivan |
| 1988 | Teddy Kollek | 1989 | Raphael Lemkin (posthumously) and Hyman Bookbinder |
| 1990 | László Tőkés | 1991 | Paul Moore, Jr. |
| 1992 | Terry Waite | 1993 | Theodore M. Hesburgh, CSC |
| 1994 | Gerhart M Riegner | 1995 | Andrew Young |
| 1996 | Lord Runcie | 1997 | William H. Gray |
| 1998 | Desmond Tutu | 1999 | Corinne C. Boggs |
| 2000 | Cicely Saunders | 2001 | Johnnie Carr |
| 2002 | Nasr Abu Zayd | 2003 | Robert F. Drinan |
| 2004 | Sari Nusseibeh | 2005 | Cornel West |
| 2006 | Taizé Community | 2007 | Peter J. Gomes |
| 2008 | Karen Armstrong | 2009 | Eboo Patel |
| 2010 | Asma Jahangir | 2011 | Rev. Barry W. Lynn |
| 2012 | Patriarch Bartholomew I of Constantinople | 2013 | Simone Campbell |
| 2014 | Prince El Hassan bin Talal of Jordan | 2015 | Reverend Dr. William J. Barber II |
| 2016 | Dieudonné Nzapalainga, Omar Kobine Layama and Nicolas Guérékoyame-Gbangou | 2017 | Rev. Dr. Steve Stone and Dr. Bashar A. Shala |
| 2018 | Paride Taban | 2019 | Krista Tippett |
| 2020 | Religions for Peace International | 2021 | Raphael Warnock |
| 2022 | Lian Gogali | 2023 | Dr. Walter Earl Fluker |
| 2024 | Zumretay Arkin | 2025 | Rev. Dr. Jacqui Lewis |
| 2026 | (not disclosed for security reasons) | 2027 | |

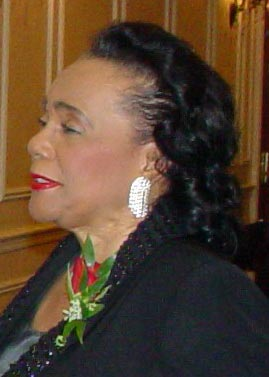
C. King 1983

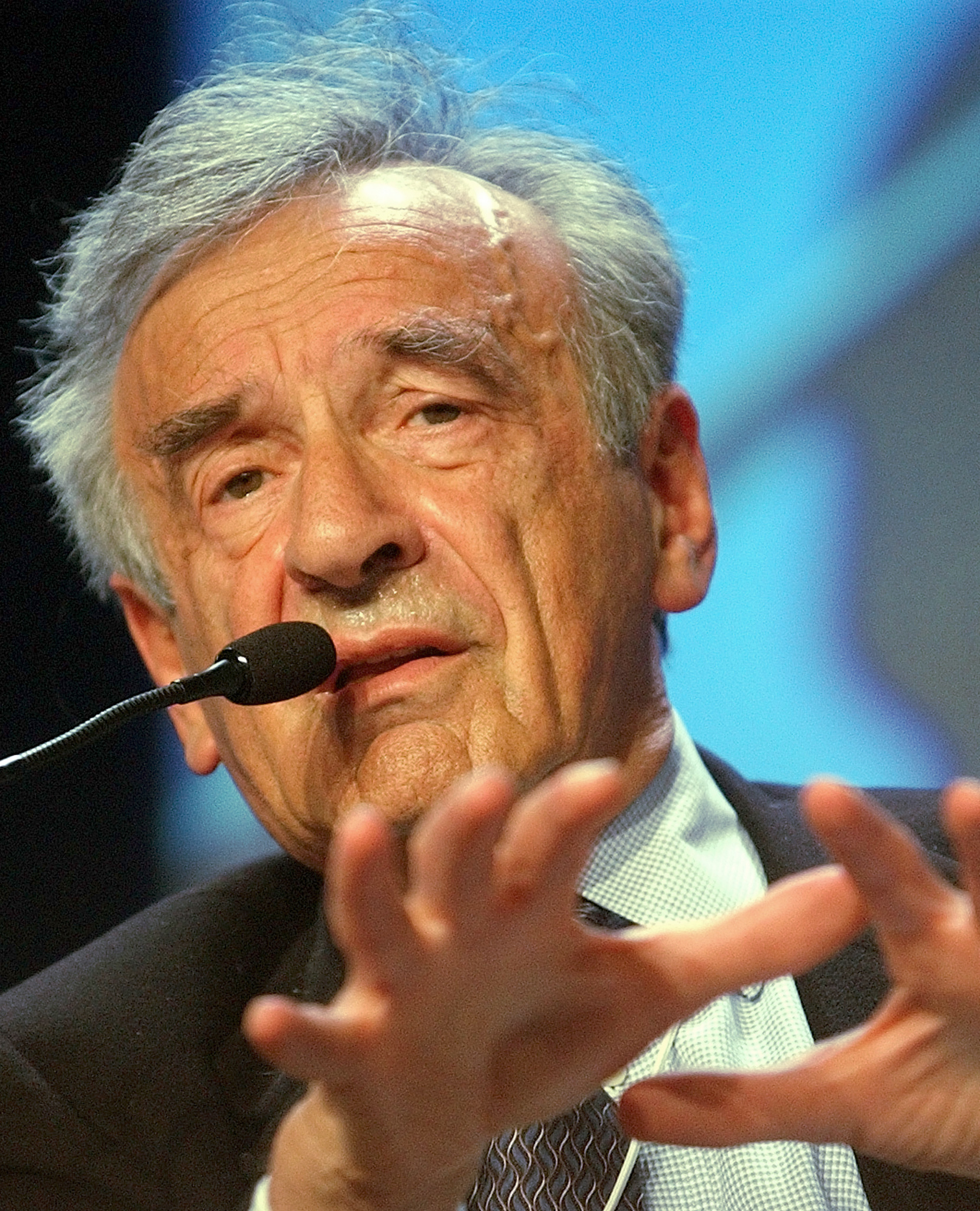
E. Wiesel 1985

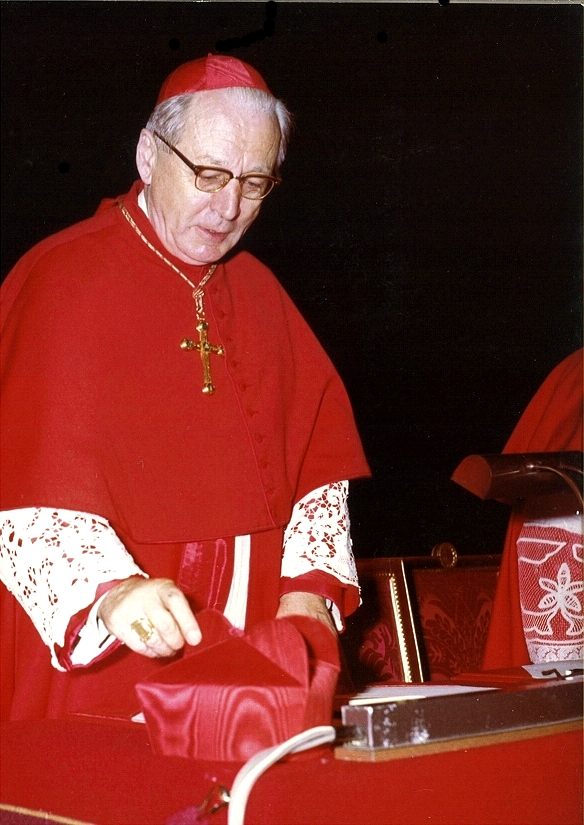
B. Alfrink 1986

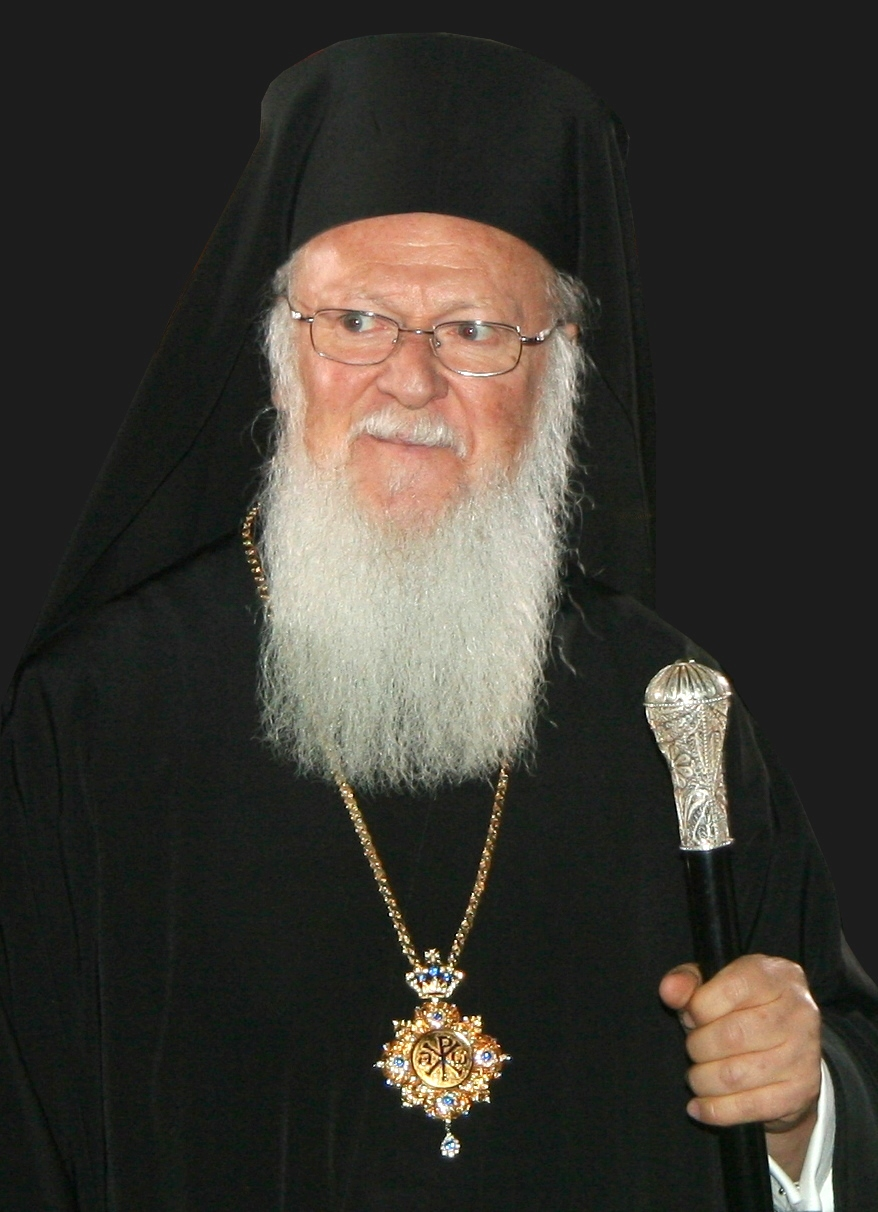
Bartholomew I 2012

=== Freedom from Want ===
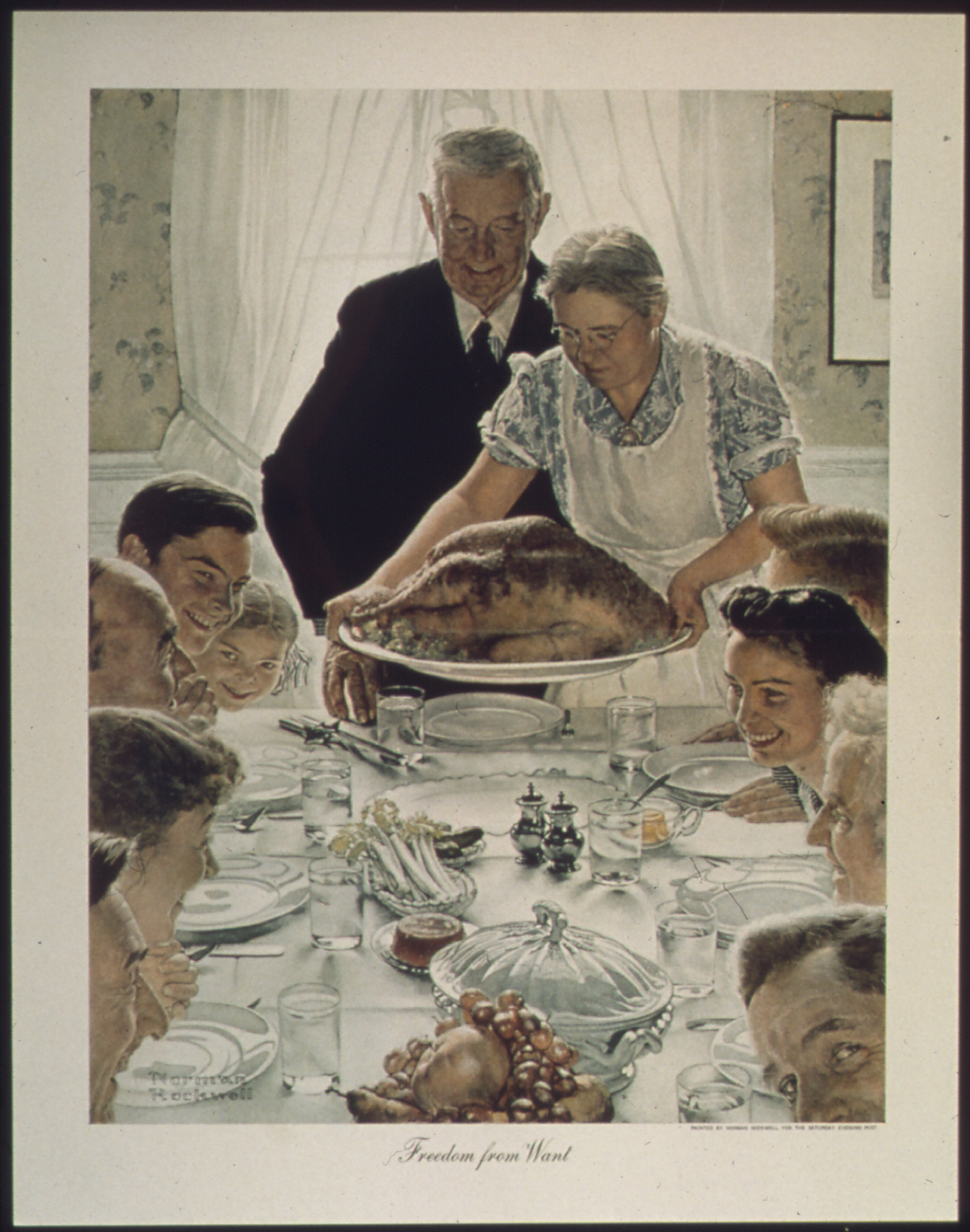
Freedom from Want of painter Norman Rockwell of 1943

The third is freedom from want — which, translated into world terms, means economic understandings which will secure to every nation a healthy peacetime life for its inhabitants — everywhere in the world.

— Roosevelt, January 6, 1941

| Year | Middelburg | Year | Hyde Park |
|---|---|---|---|
| 1982 | H. Johannes Witteveen | 1983 | Robert S. McNamara |
| 1984 | Liv Ullmann | 1985 | John Kenneth Galbraith |
| 1986 | F. Bradford Morse | 1987 | Mary Lasker |
| 1988 | Halfdan T. Mahler | 1989 | Dorothy I. Height |
| 1990 | Emile van Lennep | 1991 | Paul Newman and Joanne Woodward |
| 1992 | Jan Tinbergen | 1993 | Eunice Kennedy Shriver and Sargent Shriver |
| 1994 | Sadako Ogata | 1995 | Lane Kirkland |
| 1996 | Médecins Sans Frontières | 1997 | Mark O. Hatfield |
| 1998 | Stéphane Hessel | 1999 | George S. McGovern |
| 2000 | M. S. Swaminathan | 2001 | March of Dimes |
| 2002 | Gro Harlem Brundtland | 2003 | Dolores Huerta |
| 2004 | Marguerite Barankitse | 2005 | Marsha J. Evans |
| 2006 | Muhammad Yunus, Grameen Bank | 2007 | Barbara Ehrenreich |
| 2008 | Jan Egeland | 2009 | Vicki Escarra |
| 2010 | Maurice Strong | 2011 | Jacqueline Novogratz |
| 2012 | Ela Bhatt | 2013 | Coalition of Immokalee Workers |
| 2014 | Hawa Abdi Diblaawe | 2015 | Dr. Olufunmilayo Olopade |
| 2016 | Dr. Denis Mukwege | 2017 | Ai-jen Poo |
| 2018 | Emmanuel de Merode | 2019 | Franklin A. Thomas |
| 2020 | Sander de Kramer | 2021 | Deepak Bhargava |
| 2022 | Nice Nailantei Leng'ete | 2023 | Ady Barkan |
| 2024 | Sônia Guajajara | 2025 | World Central Kitchen |
| 2026 | Isidora Uribe Silva | 2027 | |

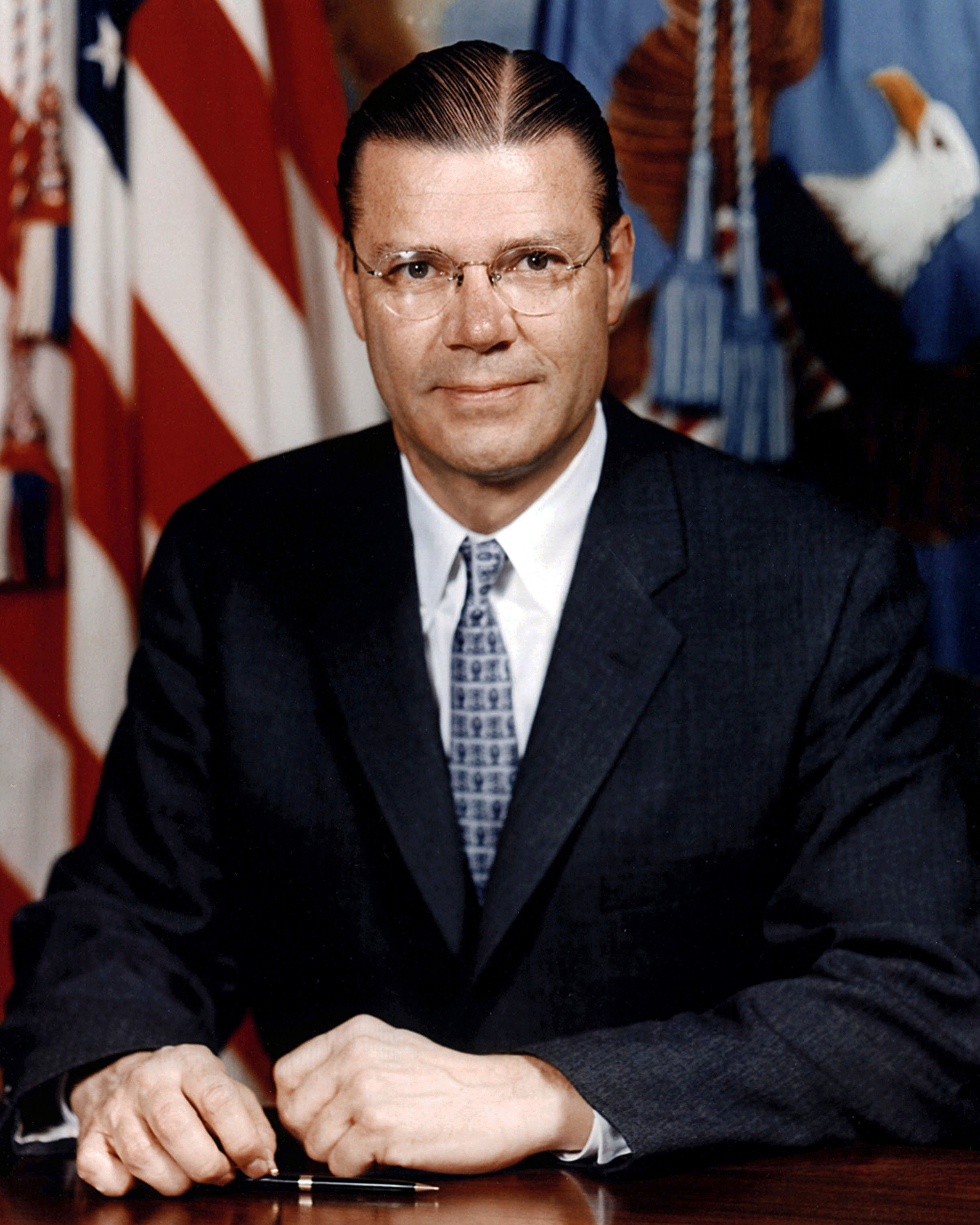
R. McNamara 1983

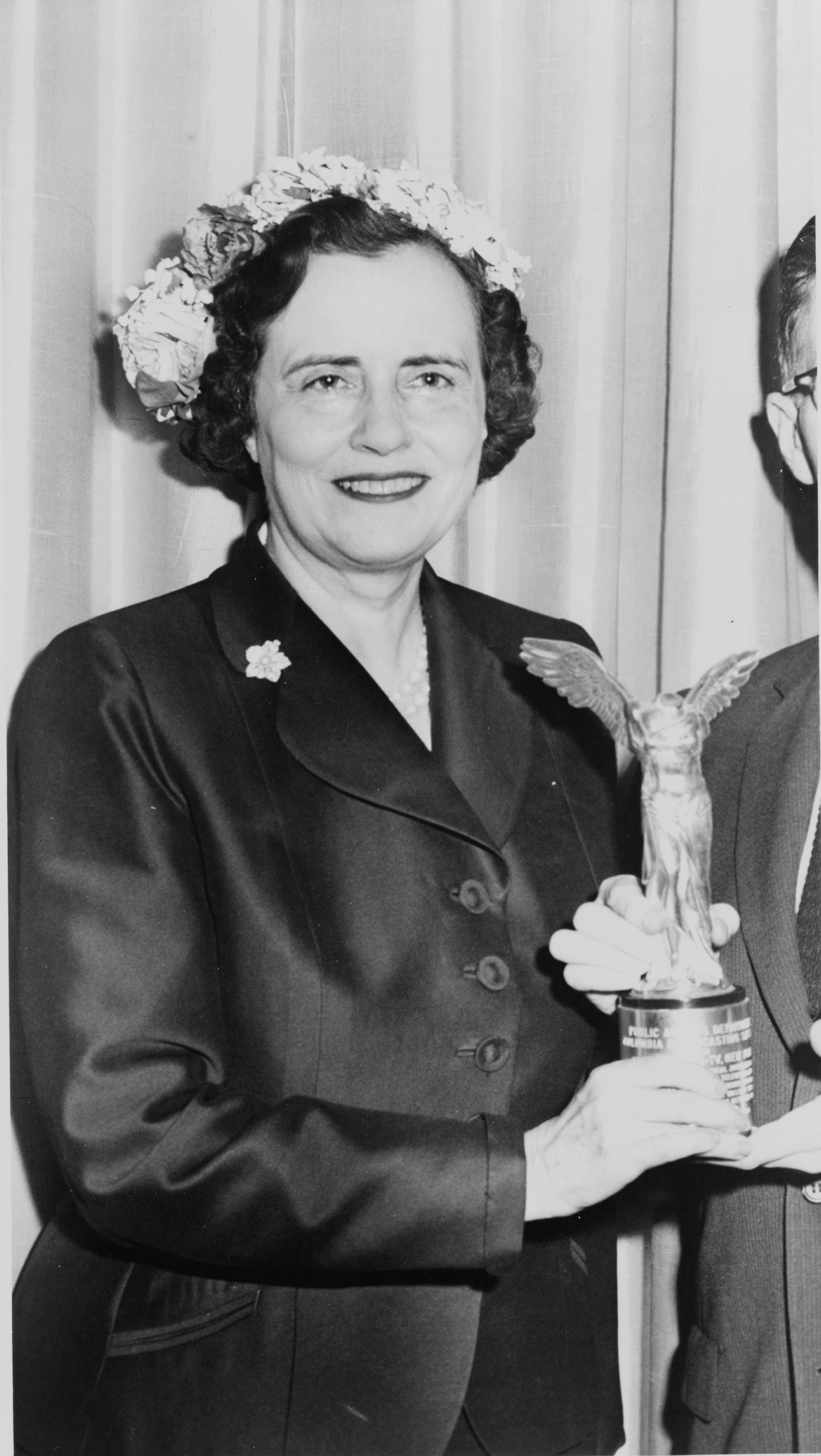
M. Lasker 1987

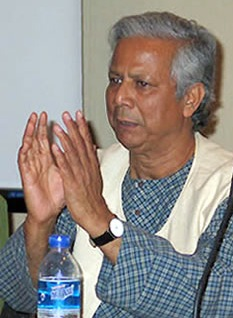
M. Yunus 2006

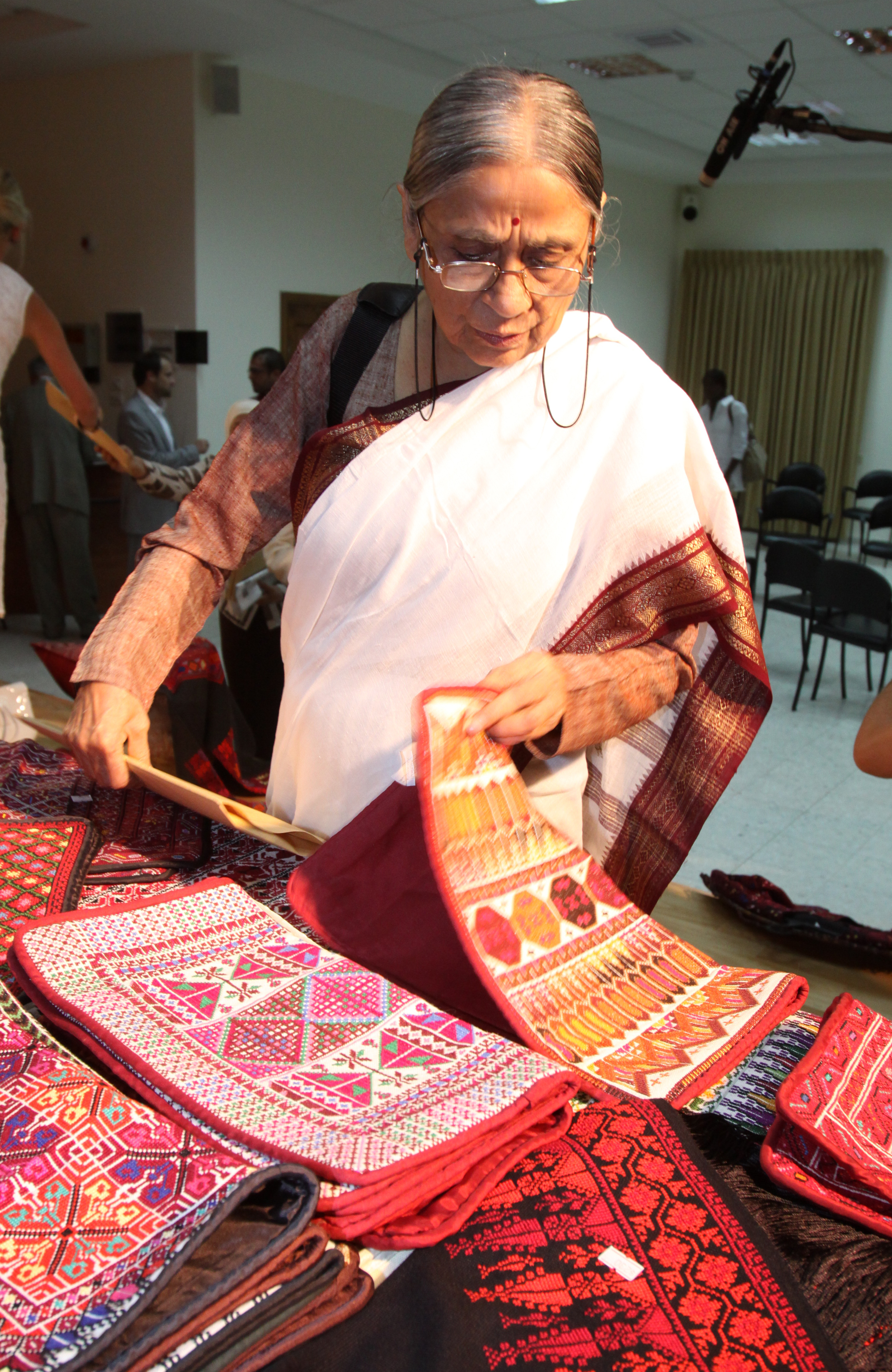
E. Bhatt 2012

=== Freedom from Fear ===
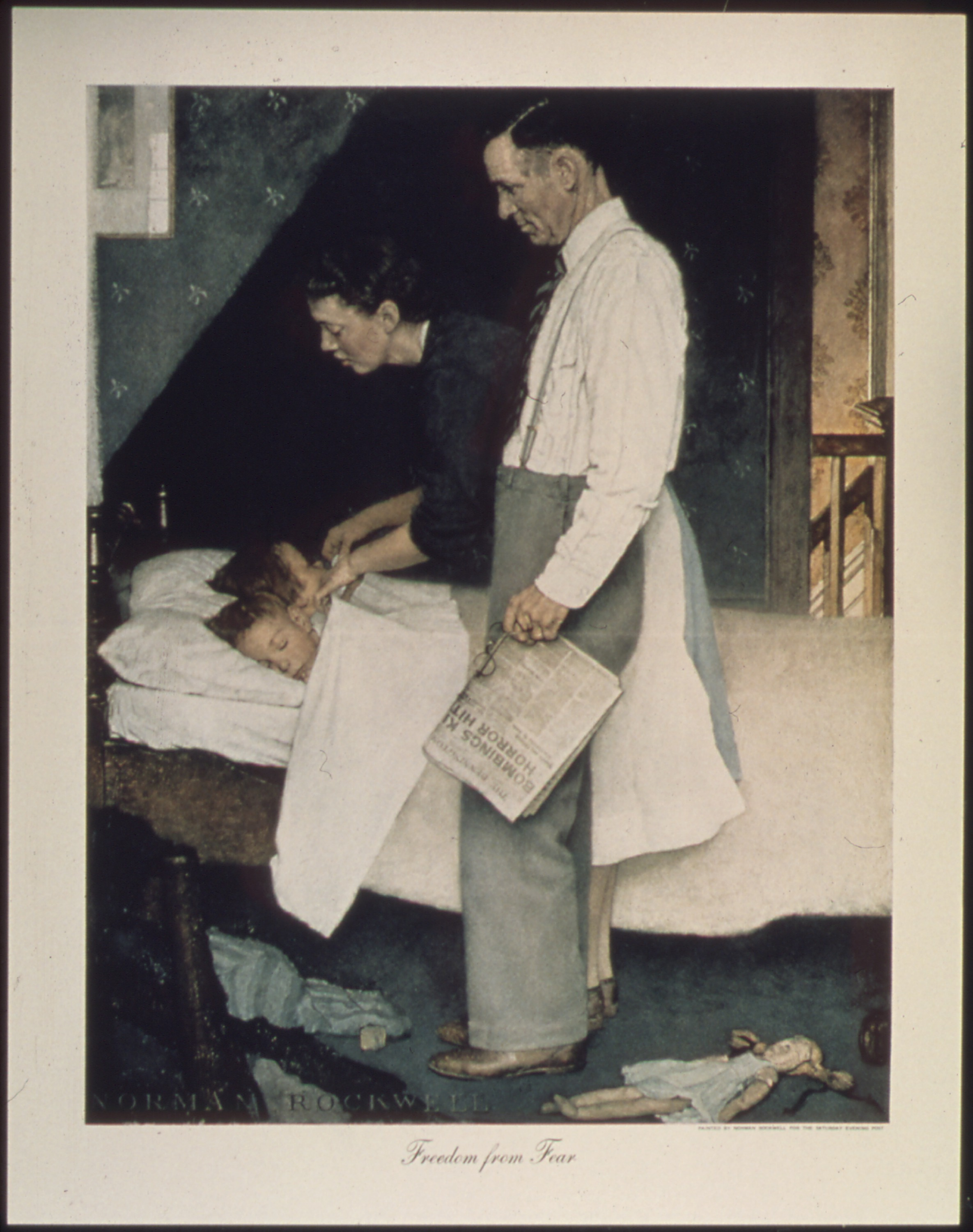
Freedom from Fear of Norman Rockwell of 1943

The fourth is freedom from fear — which, translated into world terms, means a world-wide reduction of armaments to such a point and in such a thorough fashion that no nation will be in a position to commit an act of physical aggression against any neighbor — anywhere in the world.

— Roosevelt, January 6, 1941

| Year | Middelburg | Year | Hyde Park |
|---|---|---|---|
| 1982 | J. Herman van Roijen | 1983 | Jacob K. Javits |
| 1984 | Brian Urquhart | 1985 | Isidor Rabi |
| 1986 | Olof Palme (posthumously) | 1987 | George Kennan |
| 1988 | Armand Hammer | 1989 | J. William Fulbright |
| 1990 | Simon Wiesenthal | 1991 | Mike Mansfield |
| 1992 | Lord Carrington | 1993 | George Ball |
| 1994 | Zdravko Grebo | 1995 | Elliot Richardson |
| 1996 | Shimon Peres | 1997 | Daniel K. Inouye |
| 1998 | Craig Kielburger | 1999 | Robert O. Muller |
| 2000 | Louise Arbour | 2001 | W.W. II veterans as represented by: Richard Winters (U.S. Army); Robert E. Bush (U.S. Navy); William T. Ketcham (U.S. Marine Corps); Lee A. Archer, Jr. (U.S. Air Force); Ellen Buckley (U.S. Army Nurse Corps) |
| 2002 | Ernesto Zedillo | 2003 | Robert C. Byrd |
| 2004 | Max Kohnstamm | 2005 | Lee H. Hamilton and Thomas Kean |
| 2006 | Aung San Suu Kyi | 2007 | Brent Scowcroft |
| 2008 | Willemijn Verloop - War Child | 2009 | Pasquale J. D'Amuro |
| 2010 | Gareth Evans | 2011 | Bryan A. Stevenson |
| 2012 | Hussain al-Shahristani | 2013 | Ameena Matthews |
| 2014 | Malala Yousafzai | 2015 | The Nation |
| 2016 | Human Rights Watch | 2017 | Cristina Jiménez Moreta |
| 2018 | Urmila Chaudhary | 2019 | Sandy Hook Promise |
| 2020 | Leoluca Orlando | 2021 | Worker Rights Activists for the Excluded Workers Fund |
| 2022 | ÜniKuir | 2023 | Bennie Thompson |
| 2024 | Grace Forrest | 2025 | Center for Victims of Torture |
| 2026 | Gisèle Pelicot | 2027 | |

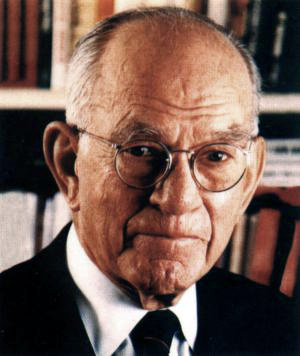
W. Fulbright 1989

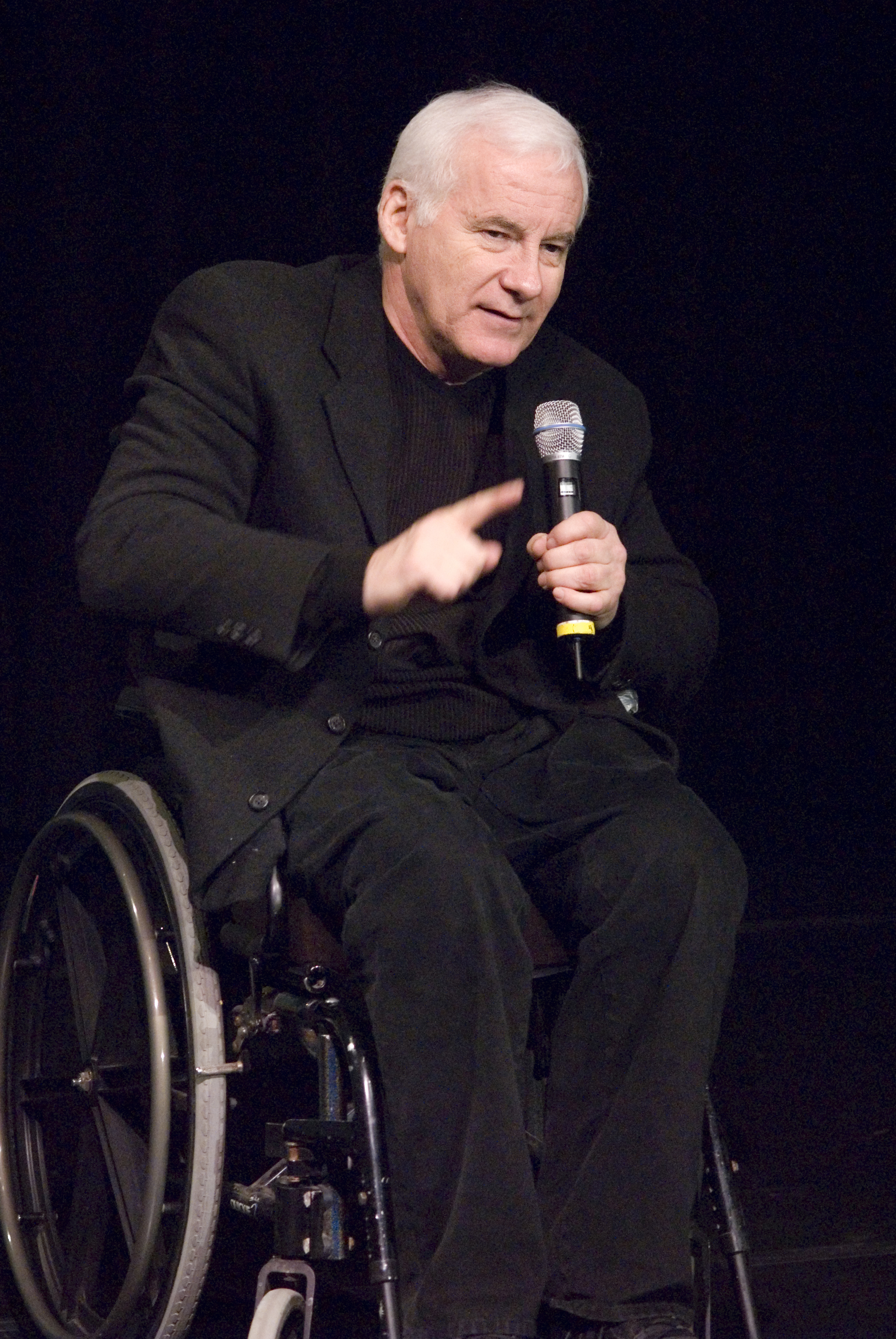
B. Muller 1999

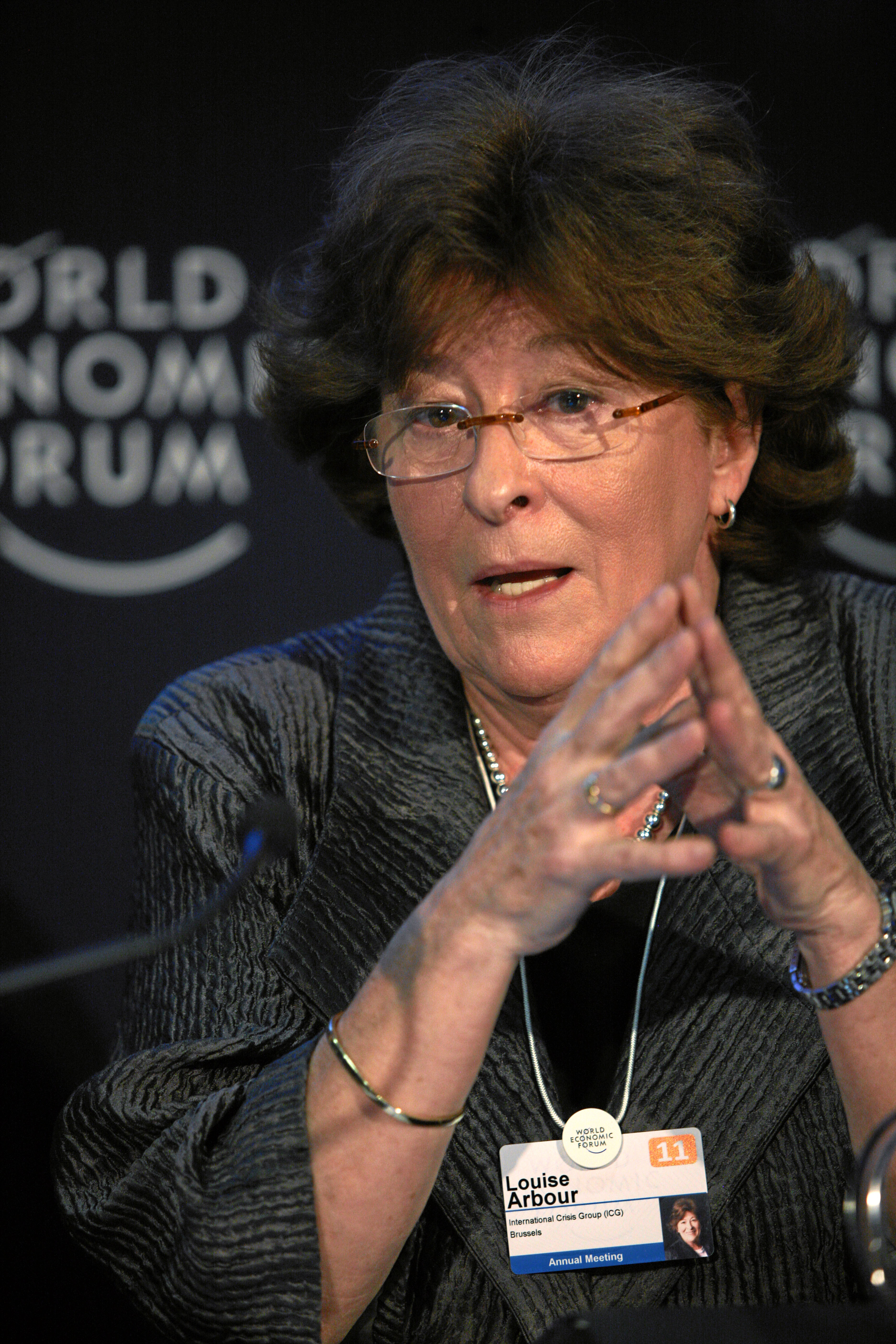
L. Arbour 2000

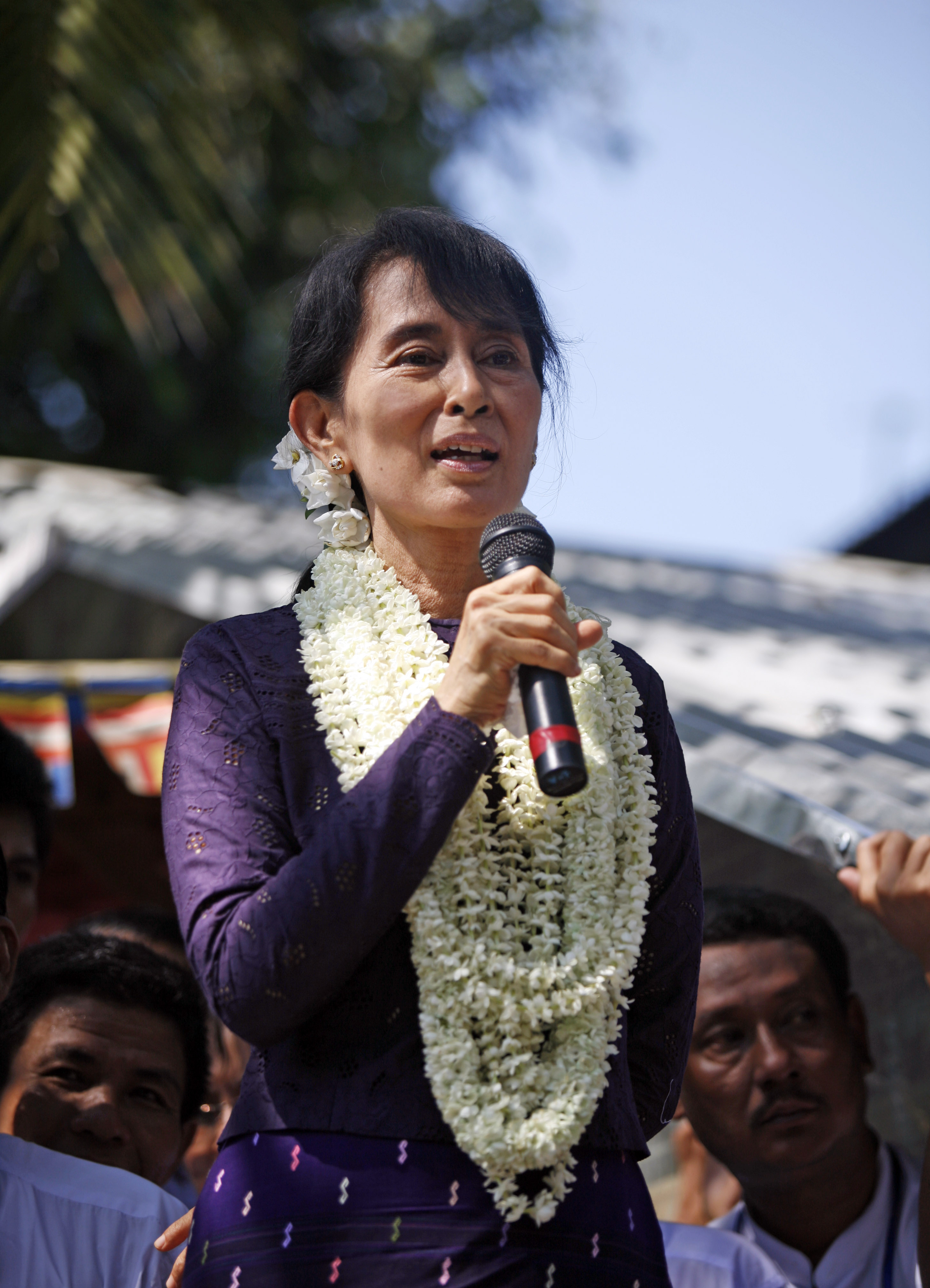
Aung San S. 2006

=== Special presentations ===
| 1984 | Simone Veil (Centennial Award) | 2002 | William vanden Heuvel | 2005 | BBC World Service |
| 1990 | Mikhail Gorbachev | 2003 | Arthur Schlesinger Jr. | 2005 | Mary Soames |
| 1995 | Jonas Salk | 2004 | Anton Rupert | 2006 | Mike Wallace |
| 1995 | Ruud Lubbers | 2004 | Bob Dole | 2008 | Forrest Church |

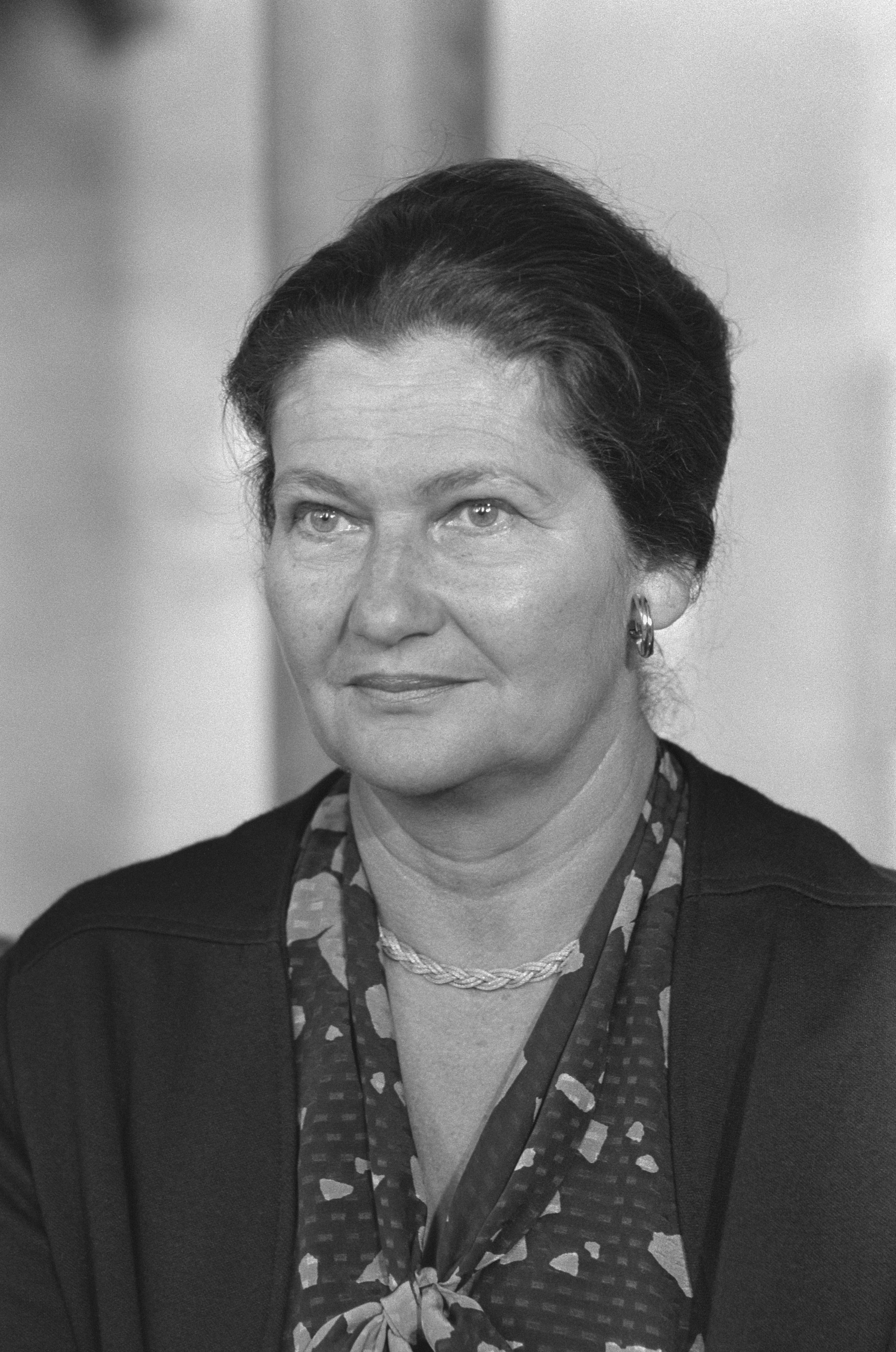
Simone Veil 1984

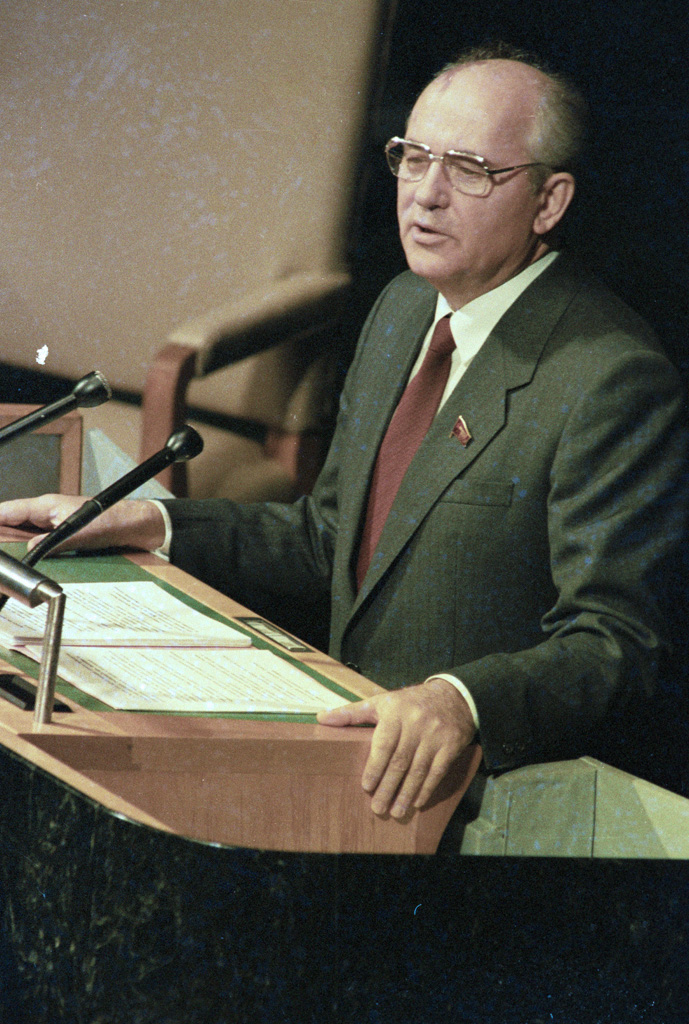
M. Gorbachev 1990

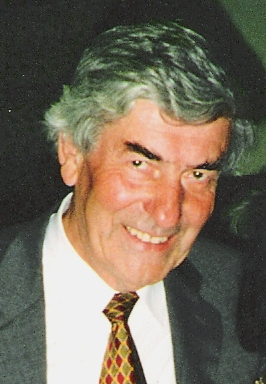
R. Lubbers 1995

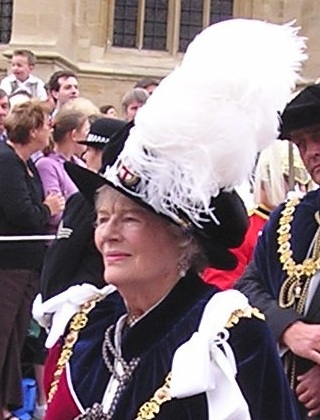
M. Soames 2005

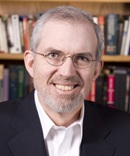
F. Church 2008

== See also ==
- Four Freedoms Monument
- William O. Douglas Prize
- List of religion-related awards
