= Pasquale J. D'Amuro =

Pat D'Amuro

Director of FBI New York
- In office 2003–2005

Personal details
- Born: Pasquale J. D'Amuro
- Education: Niagara University
- Occupation: FBI director Businessman
- Awards: Four Freedoms Award in the category Freedom from fear

Pasquale J. (Pat) D'Amuro is an American terrorism authority, former intelligence agent and television analyst. In a career of 26 years he rose to the third position of the FBI. Since then he continues his career in business and education.

== Life ==
D'Amuro grew up in upstate New York. He attended Mercy College and Niagara University from where he obtained his bachelor's degree.

Since May 1979 he worked for the FBI. Here he got experienced in research of bank robberies, fraud, organized crime, drug traffic and comparable matters.

After the 1993 World Trade Center bombing took place, his research area changed to terrorist attacks. In the following years he was involved with the research of the 1998 United States embassy bombings in Tanzania and Kenya, the 2000 USS Cole bombing in Aden, Yemen, and the destructive attacks of September 11, 2001, on the World Trade Center and The Pentagon. In course of the years he therefore became an expert on al-Qaeda.

After the attacks of September 11, D'Amuro was appointed assistant director of the counterterrorism division of the FBI. Here he led thousands of agents and implemented policy that resulted in a better exchange of data between the FBI, CIA, the Department of Homeland Security, and the Department of Defense. He also ordered the composition of a centralized Terrorism Watch List that combined all the former registers into a single and comprehensive database.

In August 2003 he was promoted to director of the office of New York, which is the largest office with the highest profile. At this stage he went out to give public lectures regularly on the changes that had been effectuated at the bureau since September 11. In March 2005 he left the FBI after a service of 26 years.

Afterwards he became director of Nine Thirty Capital Management and chairman of the board of Giuliani Security & Safety. In March 2006 he became a commissary of Mercy College and since April 2008 he is also the director of American Defense Systems.

Regularly he makes his appearances as senior analyst at the television network CNN.

== Honor ==
D'Amuro received several rewards, like the Presidential Rank Award of the FBI. In 2004 he was honored with an honorary doctorate in law from Mercy College in Dobbs Ferry, New York. In 2009 D'Amuro obtained a Four Freedoms Award in the category Freedom from fear.
