= Robert Eugene Bush =

United States Navy Medal of Honor recipient (1926–2005)

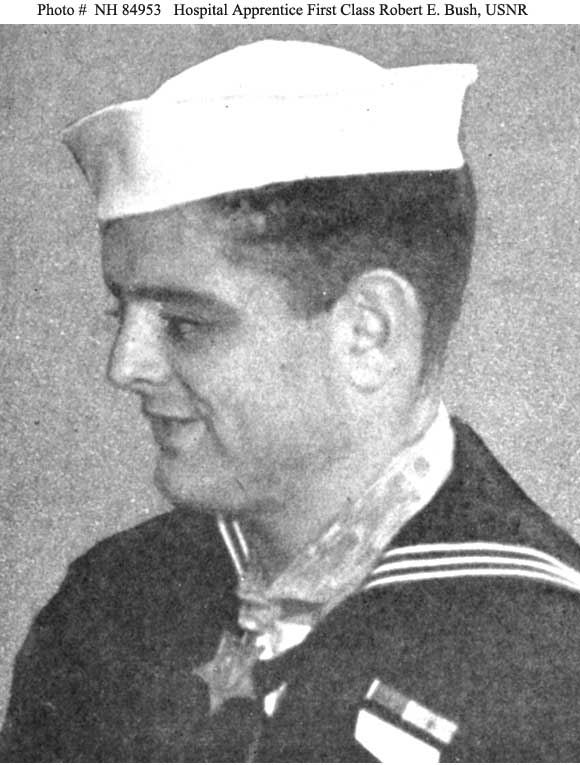
- Robert Eugene Bush
- Born: October 4, 1926; Tacoma, Washington
- Died: November 8, 2005 (aged 79); Olympia, Washington
- Burial place: Fern Hill Cemetery, Menlo, Washington
- Spouse: Wanda Spooner (m. 1945; died 1999)
- Military career
- Allegiance: United States of America
- Branch: United States Navy
- Service years: 1944 – 1945
- Rank: Hospital Apprentice First Class
- Units: G Company, 2nd Battalion 5th Marines, 1st Marine Division
- Conflicts: World War II: Battle of Okinawa
- Awards: Medal of Honor; Purple Heart; Four Freedoms Award

Robert Eugene Bush (October 4, 1926 – November 8, 2005), at age 18, was the youngest member of the United States Navy in World War II to receive the nation's highest military decoration for valor, the Medal of Honor. He was awarded the medal for heroic actions "above and beyond the call of duty" while serving as hospital corpsman attached to a Marine Corps rifle company on May 2, 1945, during the Battle of Okinawa.

== Biography ==
Bush was born in Tacoma, Washington to Carl and Estelle Bush. His father worked as a sawmill logger and his mother was a nurse. After his parents divorced when he was four, he was raised by his mother in Raymond, Washington. He worked in a sawmill with some friends and dropped out of school in 1943.

Bush joined the United States Naval Reserve (United States Navy Reserve) at age 17 on January 5, 1944, as an apprentice seaman, Class V-6, at Navy Recruiting Station, Seattle, Washington. After completing recruit training at the Farragut Naval Training Station, at Farragut, Idaho, he was sent to and graduated from the Naval Hospital Corps Schools in Farragut. He was assigned to the Naval Hospital, Seattle, before completing further training at the Field Medical Service School, Fleet Marine Force Training Center, Camp Pendleton, California. During his training, he was advanced to seaman second class then to hospital apprentice second class. On March 1, he was temporarily advanced to hospital apprentice first class.

On February 10, 1945, he was assigned to Headquarters Company, 2nd Battalion, 5th Marines, 1st Marine Division. Afterwards, he was assigned to G Company, 2nd Battalion, 5th Marines during the invasion of Okinawa which began on April 1, 1945. On May 2, he was wounded in action by shrapnel from three enemy hand grenades while attending to his wounded platoon commander and at the same time, firing the lieutenant's rifle to protect the lieutenant, himself, and rest of the platoon during an enemy attack. He was honorably discharged on July 26, 1945. He then finished high school, and married Wanda Spooner of South Bend, Washington.

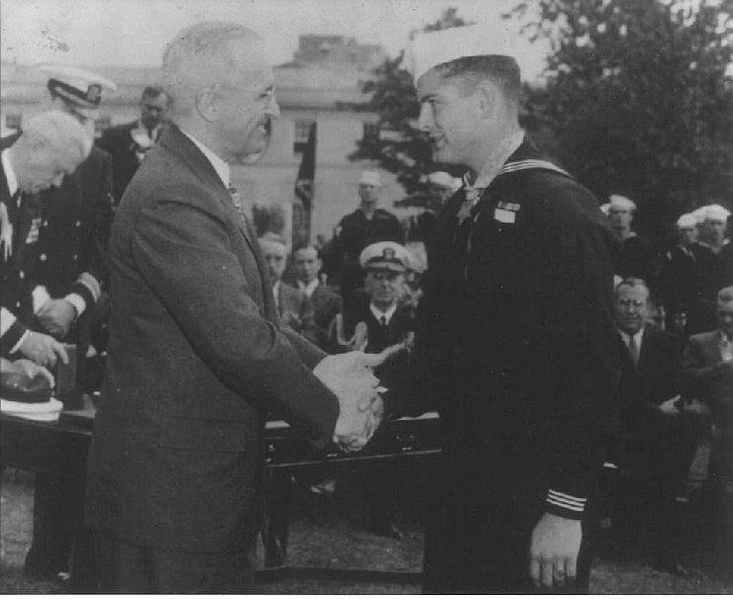
President Truman presenting the Medal of Honor to Robert E. Bush

Bush was presented the Medal of Honor by President Harry S. Truman on October 5, 1945, for his heroic actions on May 2, 1945 on Okinawa, during a ceremony on the South Lawn at the White House. In total, 18 hospital corpsmen received the medal of honor for their service with the Marine Corps in wartime including seven corpsmen during World War II.

He later studied business administration at the University of Washington. He founded the Bayview Lumber Company at South Bend in 1951 and Bayview Redi-Mix at Elma, WA, building both into multimillion-dollar businesses. Former NBC News anchor Tom Brokaw wrote a chapter about Bush in his book about World War II, The Greatest Generation (1998). As well as his business affairs, Bush was active in championing veterans' causes, and served for two years as President of the Congressional Medal of Honor Society (1971-1973). He attended the inaugurations of every president since Dwight D. Eisenhower, excepting that of Lyndon B. Johnson, who didn't invite any Medal of Honor recipient. He is not related to either President Bush.

Robert and Wanda Bush were the parents of three sons and a daughter. He died from kidney cancer on November 8, 2005, in Olympia, Washington, aged 79. His wife predeceased him in 1999, and a son, Larry, died in 1986. At the time of his death he was survived by three children, eight grandchildren, and two great-grandchildren. He was buried in Fern Hill Cemetery, Menlo, Washington.

== Medal of Honor citation ==
Bush's citation reads:

The President of the United States in the name of The Congress takes pleasure in presenting the MEDAL OF HONOR to

HOSPITAL APPRENTICE FIRST CLASS ROBERT EUGENE BUSH
UNITED STATES NAVY RESERVE

for service as set forth in the following

CITATION:

For conspicuous gallantry and intrepidity at the risk of his life above and beyond the call of duty while serving as Medical Corpsman with a rifle company, in action against enemy Japanese forces on Okinawa Jima, Ryukyu Islands, 2 May 1945. Fearlessly braving the fury of artillery, mortar, and machinegun fire from strongly entrenched hostile positions, Bush constantly and unhesitatingly moved from one casualty to another to attend the wounded falling under the enemy's murderous barrages. As the attack passed over a ridge top, Bush was advancing to administer blood plasma to a marine officer lying wounded on the skyline when the Japanese launched a savage counterattack. In this perilously exposed position, he resolutely maintained the flow of life-giving plasma. With the bottle held high in one hand, Bush drew his pistol with the other and fired into the enemy's ranks until his ammunition was expended. Quickly seizing a discarded carbine, he trained his fire on the Japanese charging pointblank over the hill, accounting for six of the enemy despite his own serious wounds and the loss of one eye suffered during his desperate battle in defense of the helpless man. With the hostile force finally routed, he calmly disregarded his own critical condition to complete his mission, valiantly refusing medical treatment for himself until his officer patient had been evacuated, and collapsing only after attempting to walk to the battle aid station. His daring initiative, great personal valor, and heroic spirit of self-sacrifice in service of others reflect great credit upon Bush and enhance the finest traditions of the U.S. Naval Service. Harry S. Truman

== Other honors ==
The Robert E. Bush Naval Hospital in Twentynine Palms, California was named in his honor, as was the Bush Health Care Clinic, located at Camp Courtney, Okinawa, Japan. In 1998, a monument depicting his actions on Okinawa was erected in a park named for him in his hometown of South Bend, Washington, which named a street after him as well.

A Golden Palm Star on the Palm Springs Walk of Stars was dedicated to Bush for Veterans Day in 1999, recognizing him as one of five Medal of Honor recipients from the Southern California desert area.

In 2001 he received the Freedom medal.

In 1998 a water front park in South Bend WA was dedicated. Inscription reads "Donated and erected by the grateful citizens of Pacific County Washington to the honor of Robert E. Bush Recipient of the Congressional Medal of Honor, Native Son, Patriot and Distinguished American."

== See also ==
- List of Medal of Honor recipients
- List of Medal of Honor recipients for World War II
