= Willemijn Verloop =

Peace activist

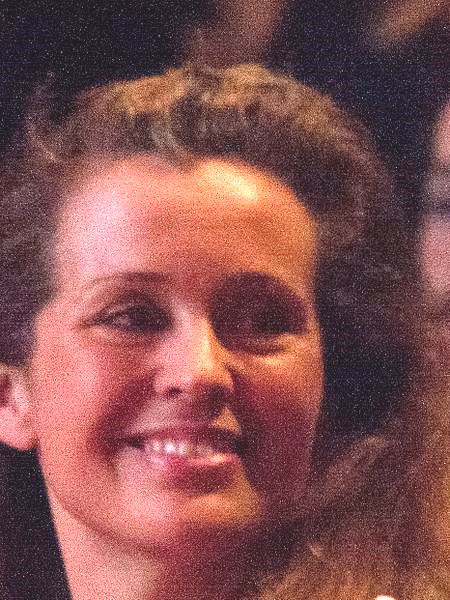
- Born: February 14, 1970 (age 56); Utrecht, The Netherlands
- Education: University of Leiden and University of Amsterdam. History and International Relations.
- Known for: Founder of War Child

Willemijn Verloop (Utrecht, 14 February 1970) is a Dutch peace activist dedicated to children affected by war, and also the founder of War Child. In 2012, she founded Social Enterprise NL, a platform for growing the social enterprise sector in The Netherlands. In 2013, she founded impact investment fund Rubio Impact Ventures.

== Education and career ==
Verloop grew up in Bilthoven and studied history and international relations at Leiden University and the University of Amsterdam.

She worked on short projects in the Political Affairs Department (Centre Against Apartheid) at the United Nations in New York City and at the Political Affairs Department of the Council of Europe in Strasbourg.

She worked for three years as a program manager at the European Action Council for Peace in the Balkans, a non-governmental organization that was committed to peace in the Balkans.

=== War Child Netherlands ===
In 1994 Willemijn Verloop visited the war zone of Bosnia and Herzegovina and met an English professor of Music Therapy, Nigel Osborne, who gave creative workshops to children traumatized by war in the shelters of Sarajevo and Mostar. Excited by his activities she founded the Dutch War Child organization in 1994 and started to engage politicians, musicians, artists and people from the media- and entertainment sector for the War Child cause. Under her leadership War Child Holland grew from a very small organisation in 1994 to one of the best known non-profit organisations in the Dutch market.

She developed War Child Holland's programmes in the field to provide psycho-social aid for many traumatised children in war. Before War Child, there were no organizations that were specifically focussed on children in war, nor on psychosocial aid. Through War Child, she pioneered corporate social responsibility in the Netherlands, such as by starting innovative partnerships and sponsorships with the commercial sector (for example, Ben & Jerry's). From the mid-1990s she was seen as a frontrunner within the sector for low overheads and transparency in financial and operational reporting. Under her management War Child won the Dutch Transparency Award three times. What is stated in many interviews with her, is the innovative way the brand War Child was launched in the market, the business approach, low overhead, with innovative marketing, positive messages, catchy videos & clips, the use of music and entertainment industry as well as new spectacular fund-raising events such as the Friends for War Child concert. In her fifteen years as Director of War Child, she was a familiar guest in many television programs in which she stood up for human rights, culture and social development.

Since 1994 Willemijn Verloop co-produced many television documentaries about the problems in war zones. Many documentaries were made together with War Child ambassador Marco Borsato. From August 2007 she took on a different function as co-director, responsible for external relations and special projects. In the subsequent period she initiated several War Child media projects - among other things, she was the initiator and co-producer of the film The Silent Army that won the Un Certain Regard award at the Cannes Film Festival. In 2010 after 15 years directorship of War Child, she resigned to become the (unpaid) Vice Chairman of the Supervisory Board of War Child Holland.

=== Social Enterprise NL ===
In 2012 Verloop became the director of the Dutch national platform for social entrepreneurs Social Enterprise NL, which she founded together with Mark Hillen. Social Enterprise NL aims to connect social enterprises, to enhance, grow and support the Social enterprise sector in the Netherlands. Social enterprises are businesses that primarily pursue a social purpose. By strengthening the sector, the overall social impact of these companies will be largely increased. According to a report by the NOS, there is a huge growth potential for Social Enterprises in the Netherlands.

In 2013 Verloop also started Rubio Impact Ventures, formerly known as Social Impact Ventures, together with Machteld Groothuis, an equity fund for Dutch social entrepreneurs in which she is a partner.

=== Other roles ===
Verloop is or was a board member of the ECCP (European Centre for Conflict Prevention), Stadsschouwburg Amsterdam, Eureko Achmea Foundation, Foundation for Child Soldier and Movies that Matter filmfestival, commissioner of the Amsterdam School of the Arts, Natuur & Milieu Foundation, Mundial Productions, Tony's Chocolonely, and V-Ventures. Besides that, she's the chairwoman of the Dutch National Advisory Board on Impact Investing. She also sits on various advice committees.

== Awards ==
- In 2003, she was awarded the Helene de Montigny-prize for "an immense contribution to combating the consequences of war and violence involving children in war-affected areas, the most innocent and vulnerable victims." This award was previously presented to Prince Bernhard and Max van der Stoel.
- On 12 January 2007 she was bestowed with the high honour of Officer of the Order of Orange-Nassau for her "boundless commitment to peace and for her work for children affected by war". She received the honour from Mayor Cohen of Amsterdam on behalf of the Queen.
- On 24 May 2008, on behalf of War Child Netherlands, she received the Roosevelt Institute award "Freedom from Fear" of the International Four Freedoms Award 2008, for her work helping millions of children in war zones.

== Publications ==
- Willemijn Verloop (2011). Opportunities for the Dutch social enterprise sector - Overview, challenges and support network for Dutch social enterprises (Report). McKinsey.
- Mark Hillen; Willemijn Verloop (2013). Verbeter de wereld. Begin een bedrijf. ISBN 9047006585.
- Mark Hillen; Willemijn Verloop (2014). Social Enterprise Unraveled - Best practice from the Netherlands. ISBN 9492004054.
