= Treddy Ketcham =

American Marine Corps officer and sports director

- Born: William Tredwell Ketcham, Jr. August 6, 1919; Cedarhurst, Long Island, New York
- Died: July 18, 2006 (aged 86); Lawrence, Long Island, New York
- Military career
- Allegiance: United States of America
- Branch: U.S. Marine Corps (Reserve)
- Service years: 1941–1946
- Nickname: Treddy
- Unit: 3rd Battalion 24th Marines
- Conflicts: World War II: Battle of Iwo Jima
- Awards: Navy Cross; Purple Heart; Four Freedoms Award
- Other work: Sports director

William Tredwell "Treddy" Ketcham, Jr. (August 6, 1919 – July 18, 2006) was a United States Marine Corps officer in World War II and a sports director in tennis and squash afterwards.

== Life ==
At the beginning of 1945, he commanded the 1st Company 3rd Battalion of the 24th Regiment of the United States Marine Corps in the Pacific War. During the Battle of Iwo Jima he was wounded by a bullet in his arm and shrapnel in his leg. Despite his wounds and loss of blood he refused to be evacuated. With the risk of losing his own life, he led his troops off the strand and launched a successful counterattack against some twenty Japanese soldiers that had been firing upon them.

After the war he graduated from Yale Law School, and worked for the American Secretary of State in London, as a special assistant to the chairman of NATO. Upon returning to New York City he served for the law firm Davis Polk & Wardwell. He was subsequently hired as a special counsel for IBM until his pension in 1984.

Outside his career, Ketcham was a passionate tennis and squash player. For these sports he worked on the highest administrative ranks. As such he was president of the United States Squash Racquets Association, and for many years director of the International Lawn Tennis Club (USIC).

He donated money to fund the Yale Squash Center which was named for him. The Treddy Ketcham Yale Club Invitational tournament is held there each year.

Ketcham also served as a long-standing president of the Rockaway Hunting Club, which included golf, tennis and squash as major activities. Next to that he participated in many other boards, like the Saint Nicholas Society in the City of New York (President), the Riot Relief Fund and the Society of Colonial Wars of the state of New York (Governor). Ketcham was from an old New York family. He was a direct descendant of Cornelius Vanderbilt.

He died on July 18, 2006, in Lawrence (Long Island).

== Recognition ==
For his heroic action at Iwo Jima Beach at the beginning of 1945 he was distinguished with the Navy Cross. Furthermore, he was mentioned as an exemplary marine at the presentation of the Freedom medal as well as in the category of Freedom from fear of the Four Freedoms Awards.

=== Navy Cross citation ===
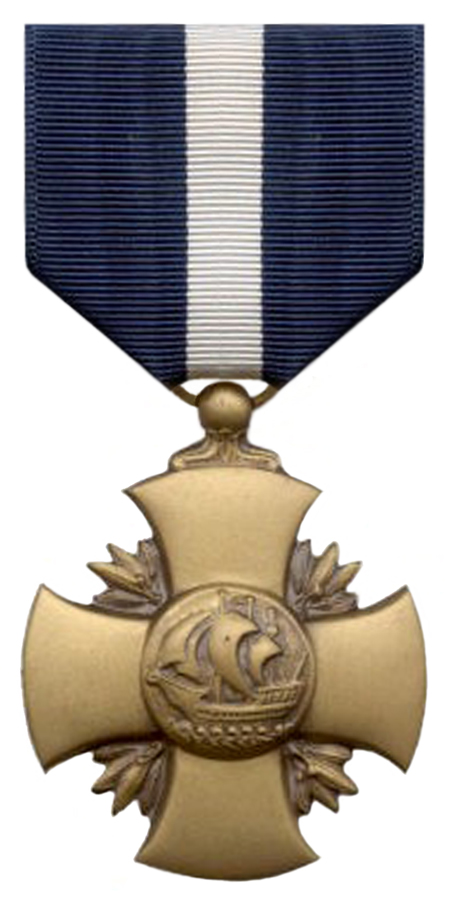

The President of the United States takes pleasure in presenting the Navy Cross to William T. Ketcham, Jr. (0-9679), Captain, U.S. Marine Corps (Reserve), for extraordinary heroism as Commanding Officer of Company I, Third Battalion, Twenty- Fourth Marines, FOURTH Marine Division, in action against enemy Japanese forces on Iwo Jima, Volcano Islands, 24 February 1945. Although suffering from a bullet wound in the arm and a shrapnel wound in the leg which he received while directing an attack against a heavily fortified position, Captain Ketcham refused to be evacuated and, despite the shock and the loss of blood from his wounds, returned to his company and led another attack against this well-defended position. Moving to a rocky crest forward of his right flank platoon in the face of heavy mortar and small-arms fire, he directed accurate 60-mm. mortar and artillery fire on four pillboxes and, after destroying these, moved his company on to commanding ground, reorganized and successfully repulsed a counterattack of some twenty Japanese. His skill, initiative and courageous devotion to duty in the face of enemy fire were in keeping with the highest traditions of the United States Naval Service.
