= Ellen Buckley =

American military nurse

Elizabeth Ann Buckley
- Born: October 21, 1913; Grand Rapids, Michigan, US
- Died: January 25, 2003 (aged 89); Muskegon, Michigan, US
- Military career
- Branch: United States Navy Nurse Corps
- Rank: Lieutenant Commander
- Awards: Four Freedoms Award

Elizabeth Ann (Ellen) Buckley (21 October 1913 – 25 January 2003) was a United States military nurse. She served for the United States Navy Nurse Corps during two wars. She advanced until the rank of Lieutenant Commander.

== Life ==
She was the daughter of the late John and Nellie Dempsey Greene.

She was a graduate of St. Luke's Nursing School in New York City.

From 1942 to 1946 during World War II, she served in the United States Navy Nurse Corps. She was stationed at the United States Naval Hospital San Diego, California, Great Lakes Naval Hospital, Illinois, United States Naval Technical Air Corps, Oklahoma and the United States Naval Dispensary, Texas.

On June 29, 1952 in South Amenia, New York. she married Horton Buckley who died in 1973.

== Recognition ==
In 2001 she was mentioned as an exemplary military nurse at the presentation of the Freedom medal as well as in the category of Freedom from fear of the Four Freedoms Awards.
