= Lian Gogali =

Indonesian human rights activist (born 1978)

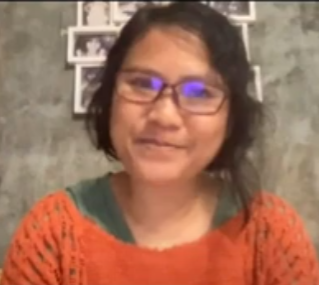
- In a 2021 interview
- Born: Merlian Gogali; 28 April 1978 (age 47); Taliwan, Poso Regency, Indonesia
- Occupation: Activist

Merlian "Lian" Gogali (born 28 April 1978) is an Indonesian human rights activist. She is known for her peacebuilding efforts and interfaith work in Poso Regency.

== Biography ==
Gogali was born on 28 April 1978 in Taliwan, Poso Regency, Central Sulawesi, Indonesia. She studied theology at Duta Wacana Christian University in Yogyakarta.

Between 1998 and 2001, the Poso riots occurred in Poso Regency between its Christian and Muslim communities, resulting in the deaths of at least 1000 people before the signing of the Malino I Declaration which formally ended the conflict. At the time, Gogali was studying for a master's degree in cultural studies at Sanata Dharma University in Yogyakarta. When she returned to Poso, she noted the "bitterness" that the conflict had left in the area, and decided to complete her dissertation on its causes. Between 2003 and 2004, Gogali completed interviews with hundreds of women, including refugees, and came to believe that the cause of the conflict was not religion, as reported in the media, but rather political and economic interests in the area causing division. Gogali's completed dissertation was entitled Politik Ingatan Perempuan dan Anak dalam Konflik Poso (lit. 'The Politics of Memory of the Women and Children during Poso Conflicts'). In 2009, Gogali published a book based on her research entitled The Poso Conflict: Voices of Women and Children Towards Reconciliation and Remembrance.

While Gogali initially considering remaining in Yogyakarta following the completion of her studies, after a refugee in Silanca asked her "how is [your research] going to change our lives?", she decided to return to Poso. In 2009, Gogsali founded the Mosintuwu Institute (Indonesian: Institut Mosintuwu), an organisation that aimed to support women in Poso from different communities to access their economic, social, political and cultural rights. Mosintuwu initially operated from the porch of Gogali's home; the word mosintuwu being the Pamona term for "to work together". Gogali initially found it difficulty to operate the organisation due to Poso's feudal and patriarchal culture, in addition to her status as an unmarried mother.

By 2015, Mosintuwu had expanded to 37 villages in Poso. It developed the Women's School (Sekolah Perempuan), which gave female conflict survivors from different religions a space to come together to discuss daily life, personal narratives, and their position in society. The Women's School promoted interfaith dialogue including with Muslim, Christian and Hindu women, and provides assistance to help women from different communities to create and maintain peace in Poso, as well as to prevent violence.

In 2017, Gogali established the Village Reformer School (Sekolah Pembaharu Desa) for graduates of the Women's School who wished to complete advocacy work in their village including for children and victims of violence. Mosintuwu supported local businesses and established its own media outlet, Mosintuwu Radio.

Gogali also established Project Sophia, a mobile library for children that aimed to build peace at a grassroots level through education. The library travelled to the boundaries of religiously demarcated communities so children from different backgrounds could learn together. Gogali later established the permanent Sophia Library in Tentena.

In 2019, Gogali expanded Mosintuwu's scope to include environmental issues, leading the Poso Expedition, a biodiversity tracking trip in Poso. She also implemented through Mosintuwu's schools and libraries a programme on developing solidarity between villagers and nature to develop sustainable community development plans guided by climate justice.

== Recognition ==
Gogali was a participant in the International Higher Education Interfaith Leadership Forum.

In 2021, she received the Coexist Prize from the Coexist for "developing peace and dialogue between religions and beliefs". In 2015, Gogali was nominated by the United States embassy in Jakarta to be among five women given the Indonesian Women of Change Award in recognition of their efforts to improve gender equality in Indonesia.

Gogali received the 2022 Four Freedoms Award for Freedom of Worship.
