= Bill Leeson =

British filmmaker (born 1943)

- Born: William Edward Gregory-Leeson; 13 October 1943 (age 81); Salford, Lancashire, England
- Occupation(s): Filmmaker, humanitarian

William Edward Gregory-Leeson (born 13 October 1943) is an English filmmaker who was one of the founders of the charity War Child, which particularly focuses on help for children in war situations.

In 1993, when Leeson was producing an arts documentary on Croatian national artist Ivan Rabuzin directed Laurance Boulting, he was exposed to the unfolding stages of the war in former Yugoslavia. It was at this stage that Lesson met David Wilson. What they saw so deeply shocked them that they established War Child, which today is a network of independent non-governmental organisations (NGOs) operating across the world to help children affected by war.

In early 1999, Leeson stepped down as CEO to prevent the organization being dragged into accusations of corruption. The UK charity commission later found no basis for these accusations, in response to which its board at that time was forced to step down. Leeson and others implicated chose not to pursue compensation that risked further financial or reputational damage to War Child. Today, Leeson and the current War Child management and board enjoy a good relationship, with Leeson invited to advise War Child as it goes from strength to strength.

Collaborating with others from War Child, Leeson later co-founded GardenAfrica (2002-2022), an organisation dedicated to supporting traditional knowledge for food and medicinal plant production - working with civil society organisations and community groups to reclaim knowledge and transform derelict land adjacent to schools, hospitals, and clinics for the collective production of nutrient-dense foods.
