= War Child (charity) =

Non-governmental organisation

War Child International
- Formation: 1993; 33 years ago
- Founded: UK: 1994; NL: 1995; Canada: 1999
- Founder: Bill Leeson; David Wilson; Willemijn Verloop; Samantha Nutt; Eric Hoskins
- Type: NGO
- Registration no.: United Kingdom (1071659); The Netherlands; Canada
- Location(s): War Child UK: Studio 320, Highgate Studios, 53 -79 Highgate Road, London, NW5 1TL War Child Holland; Helmholtzstraat 61-G, 1098 LE Amsterdam, The Netherlands
- Origins: London, England UK; Amsterdam, the Netherlands; Canada
- Region served: Worldwide
- Website: www.warchild.org.uk www.warchildholland.org www.warchild.ca www.warchild.nl

War Child International is an independent non-government organization founded in 1993 by film-makers Bill Leeson, David Wilson, and peace activist Willemijn Verloop. The organization works with parents, caregivers, community members, NGOs, governments, corporations, and other partners worldwide to ensure that children have access to protection, education and psychosocial support. War Child's work is rooted in the United Nations Convention on the Rights of the Child.

The organization established War Child UK in 1994, War Child Holland in 1995, War Child Canada in 1999, and War Child Australia in 2002.

== History ==
War Child was established by the filmmakers Bill Leeson and David Wilson and Willemijn Verloop, a social entrepreneur and peace activist, in response to violence and ethnic cleansing they witnessed in war-torn former Yugoslavia in 1993, in the midst of the Bosnian War. The trio were deeply shocked by the children's experiences of conflict but were inspired by the positive impact music therapy workshops run by Music Therapy professor Nigel Osborne in air raid shelters in Mostar and Sarajevo were having on the children's well-being. In 1993, the first convoy with equipment and food to run a mobile bakery travelled to former Yugoslavia.

After leaving Bosnia, Leeson and Wilson went on to establish War Child UK in 1994 and Verloop returned to the Netherlands where she organised fundraising events in support of children in conflict zones, setting up Stichting War Child (known as War Child Holland) on 9 October 1995. The organisation grew rapidly and within three years was present in Sudan, Ingushetia, and Pakistan.

== War Child Holland ==
War Child Holland works on strengthening the resilience and well-being of children living in war-affected countries, acting in partnership with children and their communities to deliver interventions. Its specific focus is providing relevant mental health and psychosocial support, protection and education, as well as rapid assistance in emergency situations.

It is made up of three entities: War Child Netherlands, War Child Sweden (established in 2016) and War Child Germany (established in 2019). Its work is supported by 487 national and international staff as well as volunteers and advocates. The organization works in 16 countries, including:

- Middle East: Lebanon, Syria, Jordan, Palestinian territories
- Africa: Sudan, South Sudan, Chad, Burundi, Democratic Republic of Congo, Uganda
- Asia: Bangladesh, Sri Lanka
- Latin America: Colombia
- Europe: The Netherlands, Germany, Sweden

In the Middle East, it provides children from both refugee and marginalized host communities with vital education and psychosocial support. In Africa, its work is intended to help children cope with the immediate and long-term consequences of conflict and build life skills. In Latin America, it promotes conflict resolution and boosting wellbeing and resilience of local children.

In 2021, War Child Holland raised €50.3 million in funds and was financially supported by 51 institutions and foundations and 95,000 structural donors. The organization works with an estimated 164 partner organizations to implement its projects, helping it meet the needs of 48,477 children and adults (2021). It has 5,556 full time members of staff. Because of the large numbers of children in war and conflict, War Child Holland seeks to offer its methods to other organizations. It is currently building a global network to share knowledge with partners around the world in an effort to give as many children as possible the right support. Can't Wait to Learn, one of the organization's flagship projects, has been being carried out in collaboration with partners around the world since 2015. This is an educational programme in which children receive an education using tablets. With the help of educational games, children are given the ability to catch up with school lessons and learn basic skills such as reading and counting. In 2019, War Child received a prize from UNESCO for its education programme.

A number of high-profile goodwill ambassadors support War Child Holland's work. In 2015, War Child Holland launched its own research and development programme which critically evaluates War Child's methods, substantiates them scientifically, and shares them with other organisations. In this way, War Child believes more children can be reached ("upscaling").

== War Child Canada ==
Founded by medical doctors Samantha Nutt and Eric Hoskins in 1999, War Child Canada has active partnerships in Darfur, the Democratic Republic of Congo, Uganda, South Sudan, Afghanistan, and with Syrian refugees in Jordan.

Samantha Nutt founded War Child Canada after working as a young doctor with children facing the violence and despair of war. She saw how long it takes for communities to recover from conflict after the guns fall silent. For twenty years, the organisation has advocated for children and families in war-torn areas around the world.

== War Child UK ==
War Child UK helps war child victims to recover, by working with local communities, their organisations and local authorities in both conflict and post-conflict areas to support children and the people they depend upon. War Child UK currently works in Democratic Republic of Congo, Central African Republic, Uganda, Afghanistan, Iraq and with Syrian refugees in Jordan.

=== War Child UK benefit concerts, albums, Real War is Not a Game campaign ===
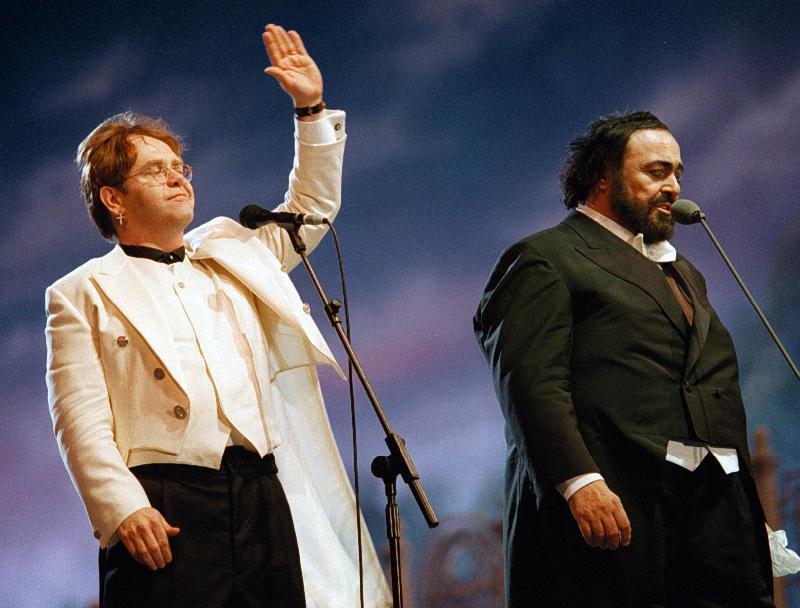
Elton John with Luciano Pavarotti during the 1996 Pavarotti & Friends concert for War Child in Modena, Italy

During the war in the Balkan, War Child worked together with the media, music and entertainment industries to raise funds and public awareness of the daily struggle for survival facing children in war zones. Artists including Brian Eno, David Bowie, Bono, Luciano Pavarotti, and Tom Stoppard backed the War Child UK cause at the start-up of the organisation. In 1995, the record-breaking release of The Help Album made it possible for War Child UK to start major projects in the Yugoslavia. Since 1993, artists including Paul McCartney, Paul Weller, Oasis and Radiohead have joined the War Child cause.

In 2005, to mark the 10th anniversary of The Help Album, War Child UK launched Help!: A Day in the Life. In addition to Radiohead and Manic Street Preachers, the new album featured artists such as Coldplay, Bloc Party, Gorillaz, Elbow, and Kaiser Chiefs, along with Keane who are current patrons of War Child UK. Another album, Heroes, was released in February 2009.

The video game This War of Mine was released on November 14, 2014, by 11 bit studios in partnership with War Child as part of the "Real War is Not a Game" campaign. The goal of the campaign is to halt the perpetuation of war crimes, such as hostage taking or other breaches of the Geneva Conventions, in video games. On March 9, 2015, downloadable content for the game was released on Steam, titled "War Child Charity DLC", the proceeds of which were donated to War Child. A bundle of 12 games called HELP: THE GAME, also available on Steam, donates all of its proceeds to War Child as well. Released on July 28, 2016, this bundle is the result of various well-known game developers taking part in a 6-day-long game jam. Creative Assembly said it would donate 25 percent of pre-order profit from Total War Saga: Thrones of Britannia sales on Steam.

On December 4, 2020, Arctic Monkeys released a live album, Live at the Royal Albert Hall, with all sales from the album being donated to War Child UK. The original concert, in 2018, was also a fundraiser, with all money from tickets sold being donated to War Child UK.

On January 22, 2026, War Child UK announced Help(2), an album inspired from The Help Album, which was released on March 6, 2026. This album featured artists such as Arctic Monkeys, as well as Olivia Rodrigo, Depeche Mode, Black Country, New Road and Beabadoobee. This album was recorded in November 2025.

=== War Child UK patrons ===
War Child has historically been supported and endorsed by numerous influential patrons. However, it lost support from Luciano Pavarotti, Brian Eno, and three other celebrity patrons, along with 11 trustees, after it was discovered that in 1995 co-founder Bill Leeson took a bribe from contractors building a music centre in Bosnia. In 2001 when the story broke, War Child said that any financial mismanagement in the charity occurred "years ago" and they are "dealing properly with these historical charges". The UK Charity watchdog, the Charity Commission for England and Wales stated that they had been involved with the trustees regarding the matter since 1998. Bill Leeson is now a director at GardenAfrica, a charity he co-founded in 2002.

In 2018, Lady Amelia Windsor donated twenty percent of the proceeds from her shoe line collaboration with Penelope Chilvers to War Child UK.

== War Child Australia ==
War Child Australia was established in July 2002. Since that time, it has been committed to providing aid to young victims of war all around the world. Historically, funds have been primarily obtained through royalties paid from publications produced by War Child including the anthologies ‘Big Night Out’, ‘Girls' Night In’ (Volumes 1–3) and ‘Kids Night In’ (Volumes 1 and 2). These publications have had the dual purpose of raising funds to be used in field work and raising public awareness of the plight of children in war zones.

A first Australian-artist album Forever Young is scheduled for release on 20 November 2026.
