= Maryam Durani =

Women's rights activist

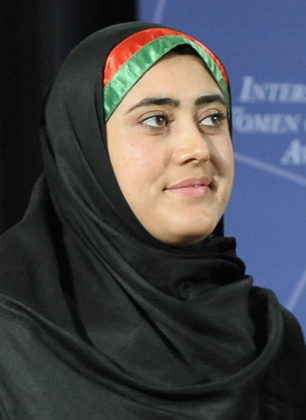
Durani receiving the 2012 International Women of Courage Award

Maryam Durani (Dari: مریم درانی; born 1987) is an Afghan activist and women's advocate. In 2012 she received the International Women of Courage Award.

== Life and career ==
Maryam Durani is the daughter of Haji Mohammad Eisa Durani, and a member of the Pashtun Durrani tribe. She graduated from the Payam Noor and American University of Afghanistan. She has a degree in Law and Political Science and business. Despite the area's extremely conservative view toward women, Durani serves as a leader, role model, and advocate for women in Kandahar. First elected as a Kandahar Provincial Council Member in 2005 at the age of 21 and for a second term in 2009, Durani served as one of only four women on the Council and has brought women's concerns and a woman's perspective to the activities and discussions of the Council.

As a leader in southern Afghanistan, Durani's courage and dedication to the women of Afghanistan are embedded in the fabric of her daily life. Durani founded and serves as the director of an association focused on empowerment of women, and she manages Merman Radio, a radio station in Kandahar City focused on women's issues. She is an advocate for the peace and rights of women and girls in Afghan society, as well as for basic civil rights for all Afghan citizens, and she is determined to change the culture and perception of women's roles in Afghanistan.

Durani understands and accepts the risks of being a visible woman in such powerful and meaningful roles, and receives strong support from her immediate and extended family who also face these dangers. Four years ago she was injured in an attempted assassination with a bomb that nearly took her life. The position she holds in the Kandahar Provincial Government is for a woman, extremely unusual, given the conservative values in southern Afghanistan, which continue to be influenced by Taliban views. Durani defies stereotypes and cultural norms and has become a strong role model for women who want to change their circumstances, both for themselves and for their families. She uses her position to foster justice, peace, human rights, and overall basic freedoms for Kandahari women.

In Afghanistan, Durani has dedicated her life to educating those on the fringes of society and to pursuing equality for women and universal human rights. She believes that the greatest investment that can be made in Afghanistan's future is in its teachers, and that investing in their professional development will ensure that they have access to knowledge and information that will stimulate their own learning. This, in turn, will contribute to the critical task of providing a high-quality education to the youth of Afghanistan. Durani believes that to promote peace in Afghanistan, there must be expanded equal access to quality community-based education, as well as support programs that increase girls' and boys' attendance at school. Durani has served in different positions, Maryam was Kandahar people's representative in the provincial council, and director of A Nonprofit women development organization registered in Afghanistan in 2004 seeks to improve women conditions in war-torn Kandahar province. Khadija Kubra has 5 sections. She is Founder and the owner of Merman Radio of Kandahar, a special women's, was established in 2010 to address gender inequalities in Kandahar province and bring women's voices to the forefront. Merman Radio is empowering Kandahar's youth especially women and media professionals to explore sensitive issues of gender, human rights, good governance, rule of law, in addition to economic, and social issues, Durani says "It's very difficult to gather men and women in the same place at the same time for any activity or discussion in Kandahar," she says. "That's why I started the station, to convey a message to the maximum number of people at the same time." founded the Kandahar women's advocacy network, Kandahar Women's Network is an advocacy platform functioning for women's empowerment since 2013. Kandahar women's Network has 25 women led organizations as its members. Founder of the Malalai Maiwandi Internet cafe, Malalai Maiwandi the first women's internet café in the Afghanistan, to connect more women to the world in a safe and comfortable space! She opened Malalai Maiwandi women's Internet Cafe on 25-Sep-2013 which is the first of its kind in Afghanistan. The girls could use the café for getting information about current affairs and obtain educational material, which is the main reason why she established the Café. Founder of House of learning (Institute of Modern studies for girls in Kandahar/Afghanistan). House of learning provides more than 600 women with the opportunity to receive education in Business Management, Information Technology, English and Communications. The House of learning programs provides students with the skills needed to obtain employment to support themselves and their families, improve their communities and participate in the reconstruction of Kandahar. Founder of women's library Bebe Aisha, The first women library for the very first time in AFGHANISTAN. There are more than 4000 books in this library, and it's the first of its kind in Afghanistan. The main purpose of making this library is to provide a peaceful space for girls and women to read books and have direct access to different kinds of books in different subjects. As commonly girls and women can't go to public libraries easily and read peacefully, so this library has provided girls and women the best, peaceful and calm space for reading with plenty of useful books. Briefly we can say that this library provides equal access to information and place for reading to improve that level of girls and women information and education. On Sep 2020 rights activist Maryam Durani has found a fresh outlet for her decades of advocacy, a new fitness centre for women. Maryam who has survived two suicide bombings, an assassination attempt and countless death threats — not to mention harsh public condemnation for opening the club. The gym has survived, tucked away in a windowless basement inside a locked compound, shielded from prying eyes. It is the latest addition to the Khadija Kubra Women’s Association, run by Ms. Durani with her father’s and her brother’s Mustafa Durani help since 2004. It includes a radio station, English and literacy classes for women, an Islamic school and a seamstress center that sells clothing made by women.“The reaction of the ladies was very positive because they needed it,” she said, shortly after working out with a group of clients. “What bothered me was the reaction of the men...who reacted negatively to our club and even insulted me because they thought our club was in opposition to Sharia.”

Current duties/job:

- Assistant of women advising board of Kandahar.
- Assistant of Peace dialogue board of UNAMA in Kandahar.
- Assistant of combating corruption board of UNAMA in Kandahar.
- Director, Khadija Kubra Women’s Association for Culture
- Director of Merman (Women’s Radio)
- Head of Kandahar women's Network.
- Head of house of learning women’s center.

== Awards ==
- In March 2012, she received the U.S. Secretary of State's International Women of Courage Award.
- In the same year, Time Magazine chose Maryam as one of "The 100 Most Influential People in the World". According to Time, "As the owner and operator of a radio station (Merman Radio) that focuses on women's issues and as a member of the Kandahar provincial council, Durani stands up for the region's women with remarkable bravery."
- In July 2013, Maryam selected as one of 30 young activists by National Endowment for Democracy.
- In May 2014, Maryam received the Roosevelt Four Freedoms Award in Middelburg, Netherlands.
- In November 2015, Maryam, received the International Peace Generation Award from UN, America.
- In December 2015, Maryam received the Simorgh International Peace Prize were awarded on Human Rights Day (10 December 2015) in the context of the Human Rights Week and simultaneously with the 19th anniversary of Armanshahr's establishment.

== See also ==
- Malalai of Maiwand
- Afghan Girl
