= 53rd Street Library =

Library in Manhattan, New York

Coordinates: 40.7608°N 73.9774°W

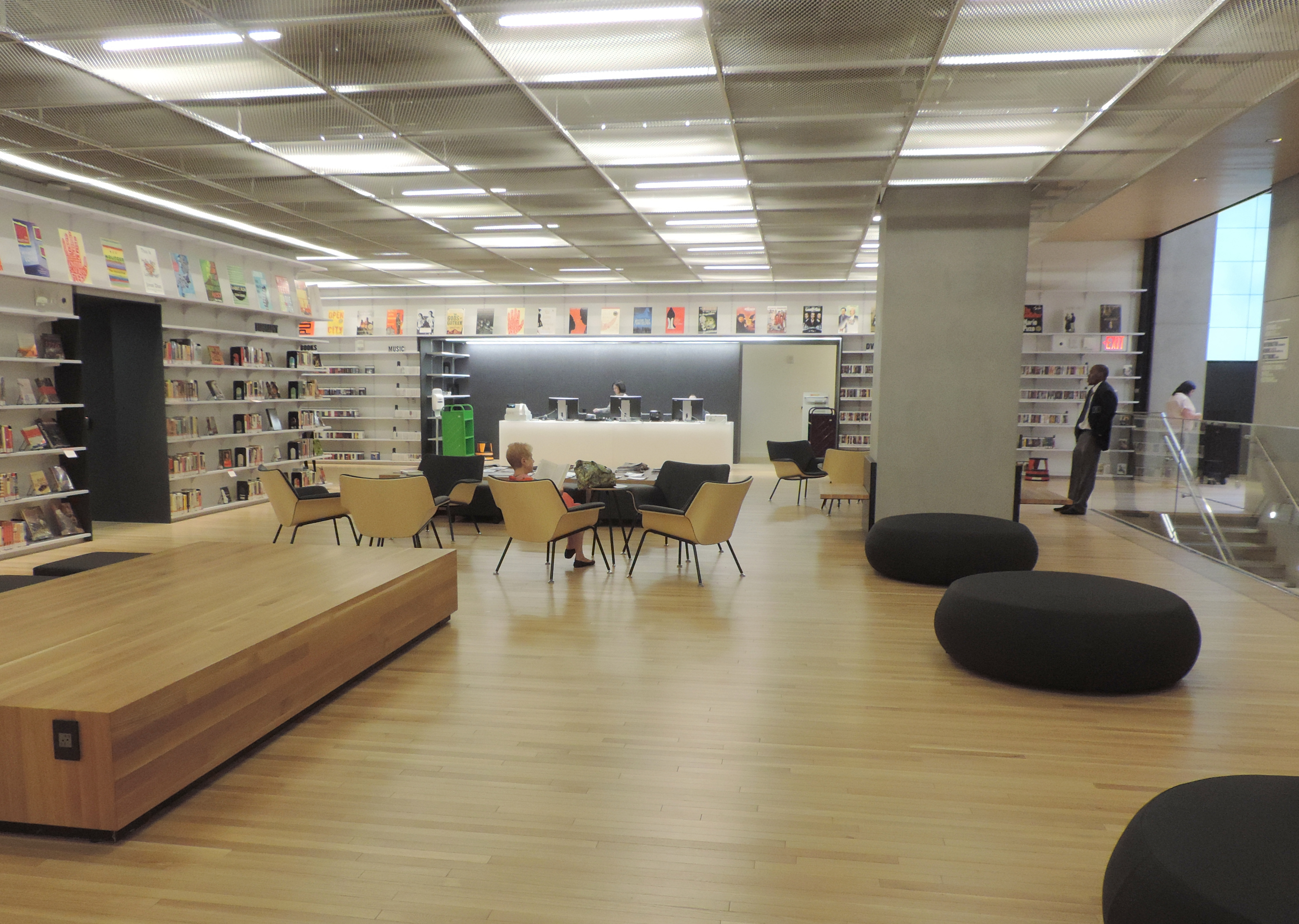
Reading room at the 53rd Street Library

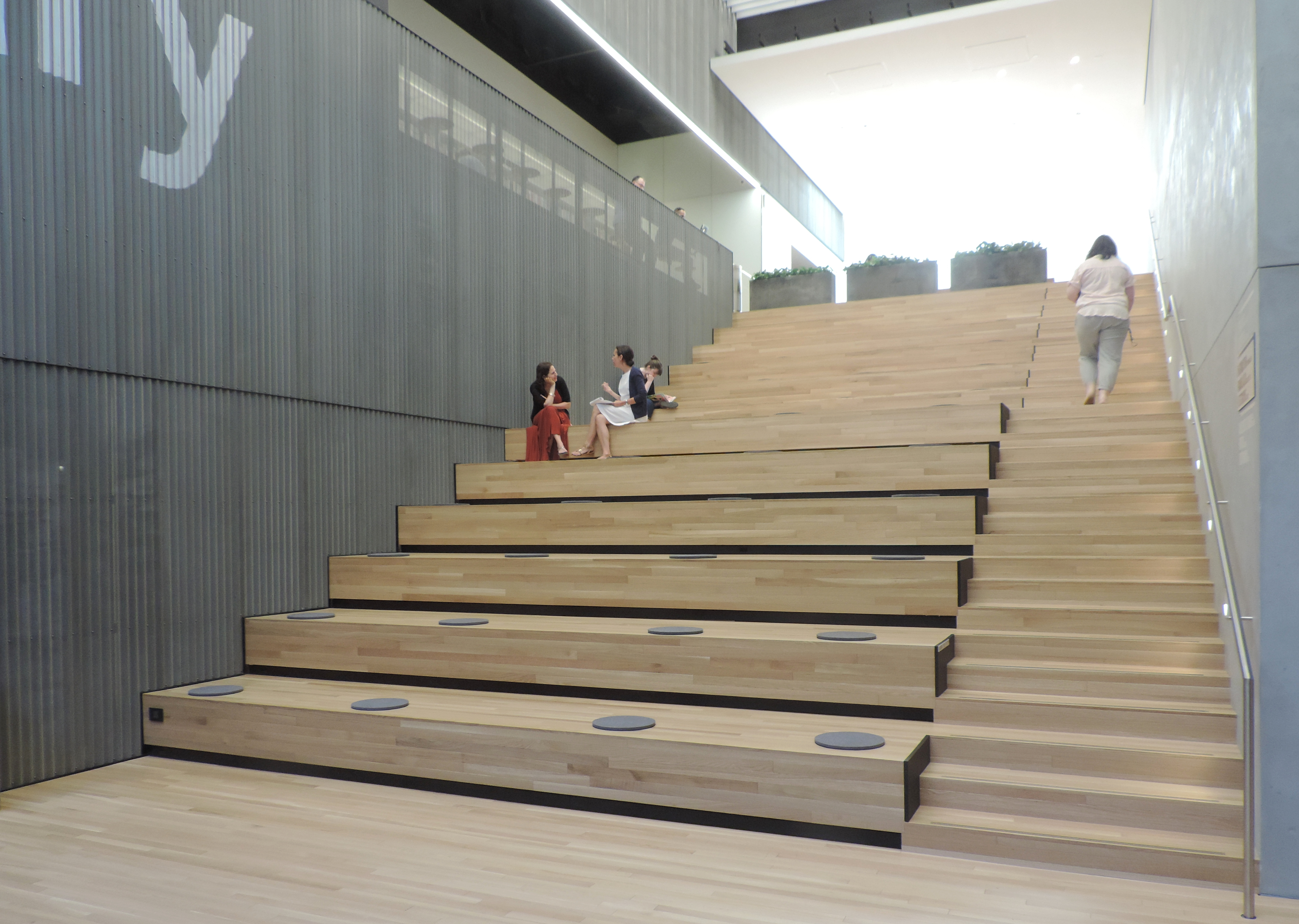
Grand staircase

The 53rd Street Library is a branch of the New York Public Library at 18 West 53rd Street, just west of Fifth Avenue in Midtown Manhattan, New York City. The building is located on the south side of 53rd Street, across from the Museum of Modern Art, and adjacent to 660 Fifth Avenue to the east. The library occupies the ground story and two basement levels of a 46-story hotel and residential building.

It opened in 2016 as a replacement for the Donnell Library Center, which occupied a building at 20 West 53rd Street. The Donnell Library Center operated from 1955 until 2008, when it was replaced by the current 46-story building.

== History ==
=== Original building ===
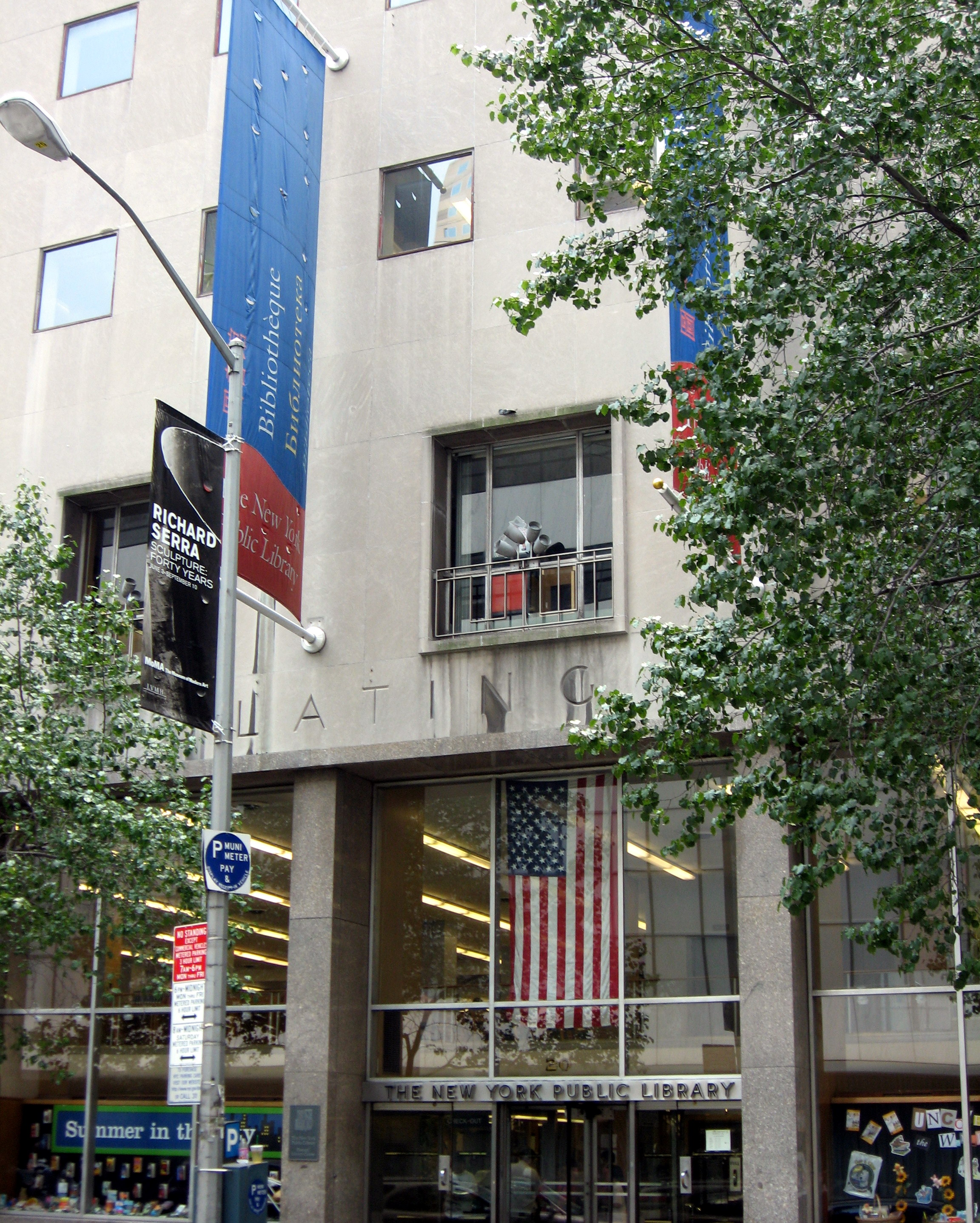
Entrance to the old library

Cotton merchant Ezekiel J. Donnell (1822–1896) was an early patron of the New York Free Circulating Library, a predecessor to the New York Public Library (NYPL). His will had specified that the Free Circulating Library or its successors would receive the remainder of his estate after his wife's and daughter's deaths, to be used to fund a lending library. The will further stipulated that there be a teenagers' reading room, open to the public every day of the week, in any library funded by the bequest. Although both his wife and daughter had died by 1924, his estate was the subject of protracted legal disputes until the early 1940s, when the NYPL received the bequest. At the time, Donnell's gift was valued at $2 million. Following a delay caused by World War II, the NYPL first announced plans to construct a library branch on 53rd Street in Midtown Manhattan in 1944. This library, planned to cost $900,000, was to be funded by Donnell's gift.

The NYPL acquired the land in 1943 from the Rockefeller family, which had owned much of the land on the block in anticipation of a never-built expansion of Rockefeller Center. The NYPL also conducted a five-year-long study into the proposed branch. Early plans called for the Donnell Library to be six stories high, and the NYPL considered designating the Donnell structure as the library system's main building, taking over the functions of the Main Branch. In 1946, Edgar I. Williams and Aymar Embury II submitted plans to the New York City Department of Buildings for a seven-story building costing $1.5 million, which was to house the Main Branch's circulating collection. Williams and Embury submitted revised plans in 1950 for a four-story branch library building at 20–30 West 53rd Street, to be named for Donnell.

The library opened in December 1955 and cost $2.5 million, including the books. Although the branch was initially closed on Thursdays and Sundays, the teenagers' reading room was open every day of the week, as per the terms of Donnell's will. Because the branch was so close to many Midtown firms, it attracted patrons such as authors John Kieran and William Saroyan; advertising agents; and employees of Rockefeller Center, local magazines, and nearby theaters. When the Donnell Library opened, it owned 10,000 LP records, which were popular among employees of nearby arts, publishing, and advertising firms and the nearby Museum of Modern Art (MoMA). Cookbooks were also popular among patrons, and actors such as Basil Langton and Nancy Wickwire read to patrons weekly. By the early 2000s, the library was one of the few NYPL branches open seven days a week.

=== Redevelopment ===
Orient-Express Hotels Ltd., owner of the 21 Club directly south of the library on 52nd Street, bought the library for $59 million in 2007. That November, Orient-Express announced an agreement to raze the library and replace it with an 11-story hotel. The hotel was to contain a downsized library branch on its ground floor and in two basements. As part of the agreement, the library and hotel would have separate entrances. At that time, the library was unable to afford the expense of needed repairs to its elevator and air conditioning systems. The sale was also intended to raise money for a restoration of the Main Branch; this was part of a trend where New York City public agencies were selling properties to raise money. Paul LeClerc, NYPL's president, indirectly derided the old building's architecture by saying, "We're not going to be the poor, shabby neighbor anymore".

The World Languages Collection moved to the Mid-Manhattan Library on 40th Street. Most of the library closed the week of May 30, 2008, except for the circulating collection, which shuttered on August 30. The hotel chain was supposed to finalize its purchase in November 2008, upon the payment of the full amount, but later negotiated to delay its acquisition to mid-2009; the chain later defaulted on payments. In February 2009, after the 2008 financial crisis, Orient Express backed out. Preservationists attempted to prevent the development by having the library designated as a landmark. The New York City Landmarks Preservation Commission had no plans to grant such a designation. The plans were revived that July, but no action was taken for two years.

In March 2011, Orient-Express Hotels sold its purchase contract to Tribeca Associates and Starwood Capital for $67.4 million; the purchase was finalized that June. Skidmore, Owings and Merrill designed the Baccarat Hotel & Residences, a glass building rising 605 feet (184 m), on the site. After the old library building was demolished, work on the new building began in March 2012. Originally supposed to open by June 30, 2014, it opened in March 2015 initially without a library. It was planned to be the flagship of the new Baccarat Hotels and Resorts luxury brand. The hotel was sold to Chinese insurer Sunshine Insurance Group for $230 million in February 2015; this deal covered only the 114 hotel rooms on the lower floors of the building.

The formal design by Enrique Norten of TEN Arquitectos of the new library was unveiled in May 2013. NYPL president Anthony Marx said at the time that the branch would be "not only beautiful, but designed with flexibility to maximize public space, and serve all members of the community for decades to come". The new library opened June 27, 2016. The buildout of the library space cost $23 million, about the same amount as one of the condominiums in the new building. The World Languages collection was not restored to the new library.

== Architecture ==
=== Donnell Library Center ===
Williams and Embury's five-story library, two blocks north of Rockefeller Center, was located across 53rd Street from MoMA. The building occupied a site with a frontage of 175 feet (53 m) and a depth of 100 feet (30 m). Its exterior was clad in Indiana Limestone. The ground-floor facade was made of granite. The branch's formal name was carved in the limestone above the entrance, and was repeated in larger letters running above the ground floor. On the second and higher stories, the limestone was arranged in square slabs flanking the windows. The slabs flanking the second-story windows measured two high and two across, while the slabs on the upper stories measured one high and two across. A curved cornice flared outward at the top of the building.

A teenagers' reading room was incorporated into the design. The branch had the largest circulating non-English collection of any NYPL branch. By the 1990s, it also had the largest children's collection of any circulating library citywide (including the Brooklyn and Queens Public Library systems). The children's collection items were housed in the Nathan Straus Young Adult Center, on the balcony, when the branch closed. The auditorium in the basement offered concerts and other cultural events. The Donnell Library had 300,000 volumes in its collection at the time of closure, along with a collection of Winnie-the-Pooh dolls.

=== 53rd Street Library ===
The new library is 28,000 square feet (2,600 m^{2}), as opposed to the original 97,000-square-foot (9,000 m^{2}) space, on part of the main floor and two lower floors. A two-story glass facade overlooks the interior, measuring 50 feet (15 m) wide. Due to the reduced size, it could accommodate only 7% of the Donnell building's collection.

Much of the main floor space is a massive airy staircase with an amphitheater consisting of 11 "bleacher steps". The bleachers descend 17 feet (5.2 m), facing a 20-by-9-foot (6.1 by 2.7 m) screen below the windows at the bottom. Circular cushions are placed on the bleachers. When the new library opened, visitors were allowed to eat on the bleachers, and performances were also hosted in the amphitheater. The atrium has a ceiling measuring 34 feet (10 m) high. The rest of the main floor space is a laptop bar with 10 stools, as well as elevators on the rear wall leaving to the lower steps.

The two lower floors are underground and include a 11,000-square-foot (1,000 m^{2}) reading room, where the 20,000-volume circulating collection is located. The second basement has the children's reading room, directly under the bleachers, with a slanted ceiling. A glass staircase connects the first and second basement levels. The new library has a 141-seat auditorium (smaller than the old) and a technology hub. When opened, the technology hub had 68 computers. There is also a 120-seat community room. The spaces on the lower levels surround the tower's core.

== Winnie the Pooh dolls ==
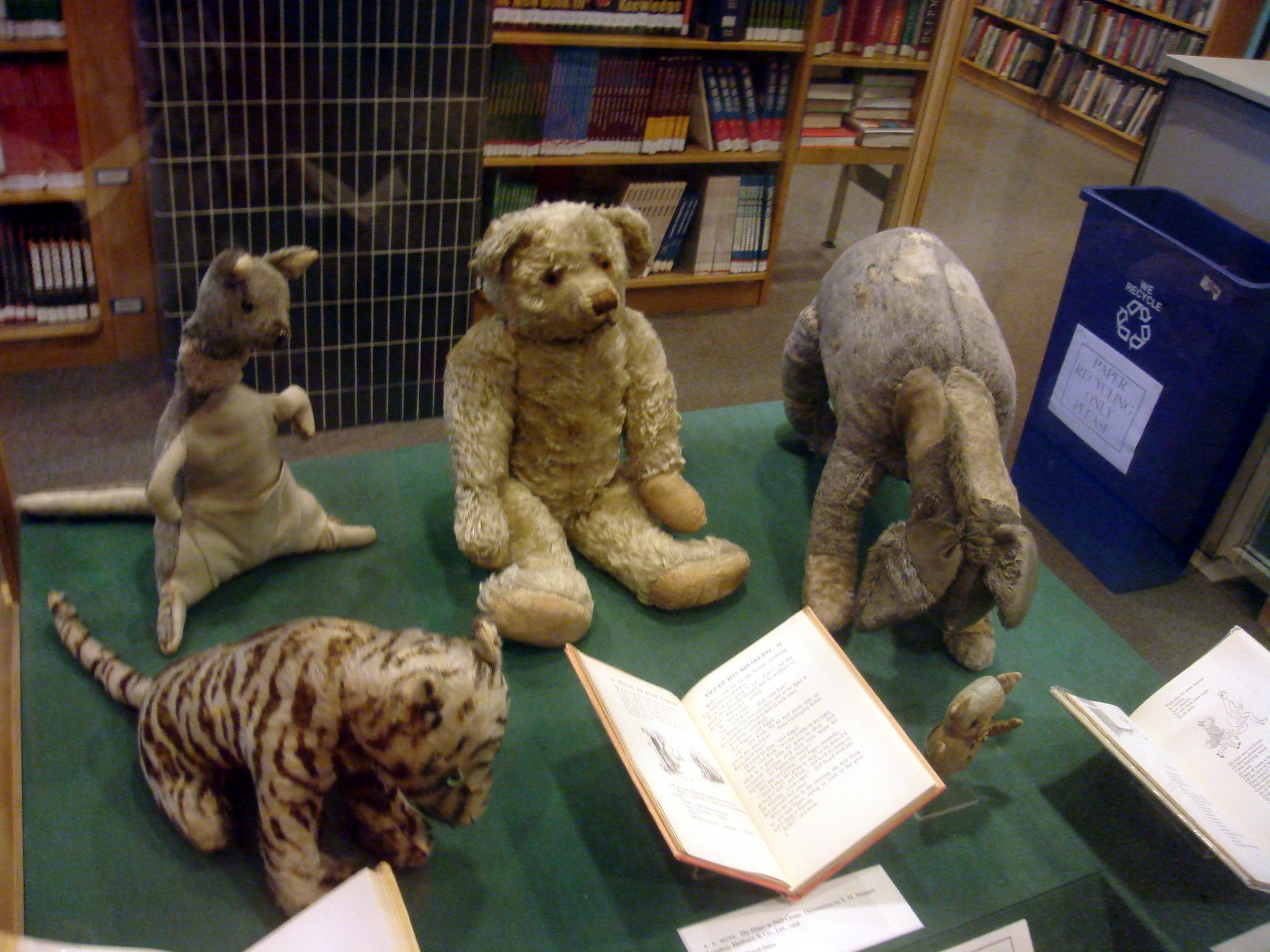
Winnie the Pooh and friends in the Children's Reading Room

In 1947, Winnie-the-Pooh author A. A. Milne donated his original Winnie the Pooh dolls to American publisher E. P. Dutton. The dolls were then donated to the library in 1987, where they were housed in a glass case. Milne's son, bookseller Christopher Milne, had allowed E. P. Dutton's donation on the condition that the dolls be displayed publicly.

In 1998 British Member of Parliament Gwyneth Dunwoody urged that the dolls be returned to the British Parliament. Mayor Rudy Giuliani came to their defense. The mayor, after visiting the library, and holding the bear with a group of children proclaimed in a "leaked" conversation that the bear told him "I want everyone in Britain and America to know that we're very, very happy here in New York City" and that it had also lauded the city's drop in crime and thought New York "capital of the world." Congresswoman Nita M. Lowey said "The Brits have their head in a honey jar if they think they are taking Pooh out of New York City." Mike McCurry, spokesman for US president Bill Clinton, said: "As the President indicated to some of us, the notion that the United States would lose Winnie is utterly unbearable."

According to the New York Public Library's web site, the dolls were relocated to "grand new quarters in the History and Social Science Library" at the Main Branch, where they were shown in the Children's Room.

== Reception and architectural commentary ==
When the original building opened, The New York Times called it "a real showpiece of a great library system". Lewis Mumford wrote that the building was a palazzo-style building "cleansed of ornament", which he felt gave the building a cheerless, nondescript character. In 1996, Robert A. M. Stern cited the Donnell Library as one of 35 modern-style buildings that he thought should be designated as city landmarks. Christopher Gray wrote in 2009 that the building "has otherwise escaped commentary, an architectural black hole opposite the lively modernism of MoMA's marble facade". After the new library was built, Justin Davidson wrote that the Donnell building had been a "shabby wonderland" with what he called a near-endless collection, while Suzanne Stephens of Architectural Record said the shabby interiors "will not be missed".

Critics spoke highly of the new design but disapproved of the smaller size. David W. Dunlap wrote for The New York Times: "Every time you think there must be no library left, a new space opens up." Davidson said the new branch was more akin to a "community center, a public hangout, a computer café", saying it was nice to everyone except people who wanted to read. Among Davidson's specific complaints were that the seating area "suffers from atrium-itis", that the stacks were relatively small and unsatisfying, and that the general design gave the impression that the library's inclusion was an afterthought in the tower's construction. Stephens, who had little attachment to the older building, agreed that the new building was more akin to a community center but called it "sleekly crisp and smartly detailed".

== Sources ==
- Stern, Robert A. M.; Mellins, Thomas; Fishman, David (1995). New York 1960: Architecture and Urbanism Between the Second World War and the Bicentennial (1960 ed.). New York: Monacelli Press. pp. 455–456. ISBN 1-885254-02-4.
- Stern, Robert A. M.; Fishman, David; Tilove, Jacob (2025). New York 2020: Architecture and Urbanism at the Beginning of a New Century (2020 ed.). New York: Monacelli Press. pp. 714–717. ISBN 978-1-58093-694-1.
