= Anthony Marx =

American academic (born 1959)

Anthony W. Marx
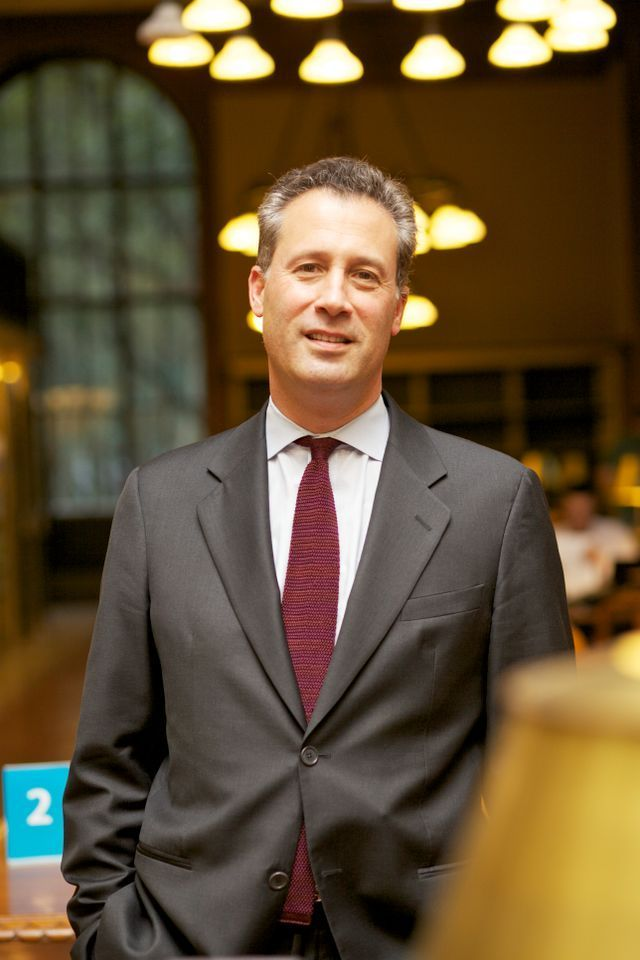
- Marx in 2014

12th President and CEO of the New York Public Library
- Incumbent
- Assumed office July 1, 2011
- Mayor: Michael Bloomberg; Bill de Blasio; Eric Adams; Zohran Mamdani
- Preceded by: Paul LeClerc

18th President of Amherst College
- In office July 1, 2003 – June 30, 2011
- Preceded by: Tom Gerety
- Succeeded by: Carolyn Martin

Personal details
- Born: February 28, 1959 (age 67) New York City, U.S.
- Education: Yale University (BS); Princeton University (MPA, MA, PhD)

Anthony William "Tony" Marx (born February 28, 1959) is an American academic. He became the president and CEO of the New York Public Library in July 2011, succeeding Paul LeClerc. Marx is the former president of Amherst College, in Amherst, Massachusetts. Since joining the New York Public Library, Marx has focused on expanding the library’s education programs and on increasing public access to library e-books. He has also prioritized services for researchers and bringing library materials to public schools.

== Biography ==
After graduating from the Bronx High School of Science, Marx attended Wesleyan University and transferred to Yale University, where he received a B.S., magna cum laude, in 1981. He then obtained an M.P.A. from the Woodrow Wilson School of Public and International Affairs at Princeton University in 1986, followed by M.A. and Ph.D. degrees in politics from Princeton in 1987 and 1990. His dissertation was titled, "Lessons of struggle: South African internal opposition movements, 1960-1990."

After graduating from Yale, Marx spent a year in South Africa participating in the anti-apartheid movement. Even after returning to the U.S. for graduate school at Princeton, he returned frequently to participate in the founding of Khanya College, a post-secondary college which prepared black students for university.

According to BusinessWeek, one reason the Amherst Board of Trustees chose Marx as president was his support for socioeconomic diversity on college campuses. One of Marx's goals was to make Amherst more accessible to qualified students from lower income families. Marx supported the 'QuestBridge College Match' program at Amherst, an alternative college admission and financial aid process.

Marx was arrested for drunk driving in November 2011 after crashing a library-owned vehicle into a parked car and subsequently pleaded guilty to a criminal misdemeanor for driving while intoxicated.

As a board member of the National Book Foundation, Marx was responsible for awarding W. Paul Coates (the father of Ta-Nehisi Coates) a 'lifetime achievement' Literarian Award for outstanding service to the literary community. Coates Senior, as founder of Black Classic Press, has controversially republished antisemitic and homophobic screeds from a range of African-American writers. Marx declined to comment on the board's decision, according to The Free Press.

== Personal life ==
Marx is the father of two children, Josh and Anna-Claire, with his former wife Karen Barkey.

In 2012, one year after he left the college, he received an honorary degree from Amherst College.

== Published works ==
Marx has written three books on nation-building, concentrating on South Africa.

- Lessons of Struggle: South African Internal Opposition, 1960–1990 (1992)
- Making Race and Nation: A Comparison of South Africa, the United States, and Brazil (1998)
- Faith in Nation: Exclusionary Origins of Nationalism (2005)

== See also ==
- John William Ward (professor)

== Notes ==
Academic offices
| Preceded by Tom Gerety | President of Amherst College; 2003–2011 | Succeeded by Carolyn Martin |
