= List of presidents of the New York Public Library =

President of the New York Public Library
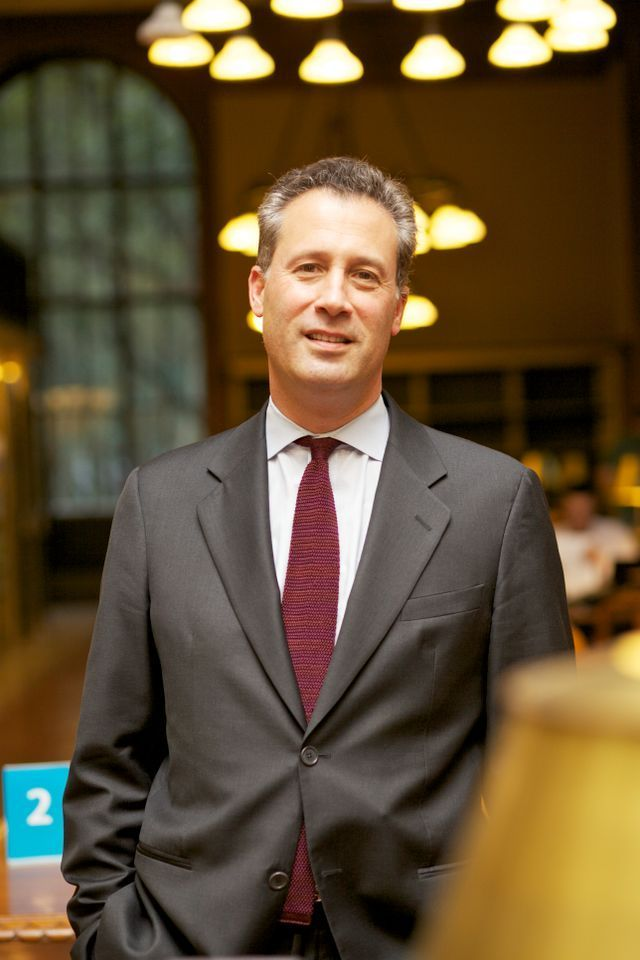
- Incumbent; Anthony Marx since July 11, 2011
- New York Public Library
- Appointer: The New York Public Library Board of Trustees
- Formation: 1895
- First holder: John Bigelow
- Salary: $781,000 (as of 2011)

The president of the New York Public Library is the chief executive officer of the New York Public Library (NYPL) and exercises general supervision over its affairs. The president is elected yearly by the New York Public Library Board of Trustees. John Bigelow was the first president from the library's founding in 1895 to his death in 1911. Anthony Marx has been the president since 2011. The president (as of 2011) received a salary of $781,000.

Upon the urging of Bigelow, an executor of Samuel J. Tilden's will, the NYPL was formed when the Lenox and Astor libraries merged in 1895. Both the Astor and the Lenox maintained presidents for the duration of their existence. The three libraries have had a total of twenty presidents. Historically, presidents of the libraries have been both wealthy and prominent individuals, such as author and diplomat Washington Irving; Governor of New York, United States Secretary of State, and United States Senator Hamilton Fish; and businessman John Stewart Kennedy. Additionally, several prominent lawyers were president, including John Lambert Cadwalader, George L. Rives, Lewis Cass Ledyard, and Frank Polk. It was customary for presidents to serve until their deaths until Morris Hadley resigned in 1958. Subsequently, all presidents have resigned before their deaths, with the exception of Timothy S. Healy.

The Lenox Library was founded in 1870 by James Lenox, who served as its president until his death in 1880. After Lenox's death, his son Robert Lenox Kennedy succeeded him and served for seven years before being replaced by John S. Kennedy, who would serve until the merging of the libraries in 1895. The Astor Library was founded in 1848, at the behest of Joseph Cogswell. Its prime benefactor was John Jacob Astor, who left $400,000 to the library. On February 14, 1849, the trustees of the library met and elected their first president, Washington Irving, who would serve until his death in 1859. After Irving, William Blackhouse Astor was elected, and subsequently Alexander Hamilton Jr., Hamilton Fish, and Thomas M. Markoe (the last of whom served until the merging of the Astor into NYPL). The NYPL has since had twelve presidents.

== Astor Library ==
Presidents of the Astor Library
| No. | Image | President | Term | Term length | Ref |
|---|---|---|---|---|---|
| 1 | | Washington Irving | 1849–1859 | 10 years | |
| 2 | | William Astor | 1860–1875 | 15 years | |
| 3 | | Alexander Hamilton Jr. | 1876–1889 | 13 years | |
| 4 | | Hamilton Fish | Acting, 1890–1891 | 1 year | |
| 5 | – | Thomas Markoe | 1891–1895 | 4 years | |

== Lenox Library ==
Presidents of the Lenox Library
| No. | Image | President | Term | Term length | Ref |
|---|---|---|---|---|---|
| 1 | | James Lenox | 1870–1880 | 10 years | |
| 2 | | Robert Lenox Kennedy | 1880–1887 | 7 years | |
| 3 | | John Stewart Kennedy | 1887–1895 | 8 years | |

== New York Public Library ==
Presidents of the NYPL
| No. | Image | President | Term | Term length | Ref(s) |
|---|---|---|---|---|---|
| 1 | | John Bigelow | May 27, 1895 – December 19, 1911 | 16 years, 6 months, 22 days | |
| 2 | | John Lambert Cadwalader | December 19, 1911 – March 11, 1914 | 2 years, 2 months, 20 days | |
| 3 | A black and white photo of an older white man with a beard in academic robes and a graduation cap | George L. Rives | May 13, 1914 – August 18, 1917 | 3 years, 5 months, 4 days | |
| 4 | | Lewis Cass Ledyard | December 12, 1917 – January 12, 1932 | 14 years, 1 month, 0 days | |
| 5 | | Frank Polk | April 13, 1932 – February 7, 1943 | 10 years, 9 months, 25 days | |
| 6 | | Morris Hadley | February 8, 1943 – January 8, 1958 | 14 years, 11 months, 0 days | |
| 7 | – | Gilbert W. Chapman | January 8, 1959 – February 1, 1971 | 12 years, 1 month, 0 days | |
| 8 | – | Richard W. Couper | February 1, 1971 – July 1, 1981 | 10 years, 5 months, 0 days | |
| 9 | An older short-haired white man with a white goatee in a suit and tie stands before a podium. | Vartan Gregorian | July 1, 1981 – December 1, 1989 | 8 years, 5 months, 0 days | |
| 10 | A black-and-white photo of a middle-aged, short-haired white man with large wire-frame glasses wearing black robes and a clerical collar speaking into a microphone | Timothy S. Healy | December 1, 1989 – December 30, 1992 | 3 years, 0 months, 29 days | |
| 11 | A photo of a young white man in a light-colored suit at bust length | Paul LeClerc | December 1, 1993 – July 1, 2011 | 17 years, 7 months, 0 days | |
| 12 | | Anthony Marx | July 1, 2011 – Present | 15 years, 2 months and 6 days | |
