= Donna Shalala =

American politician and academic (born 1941)

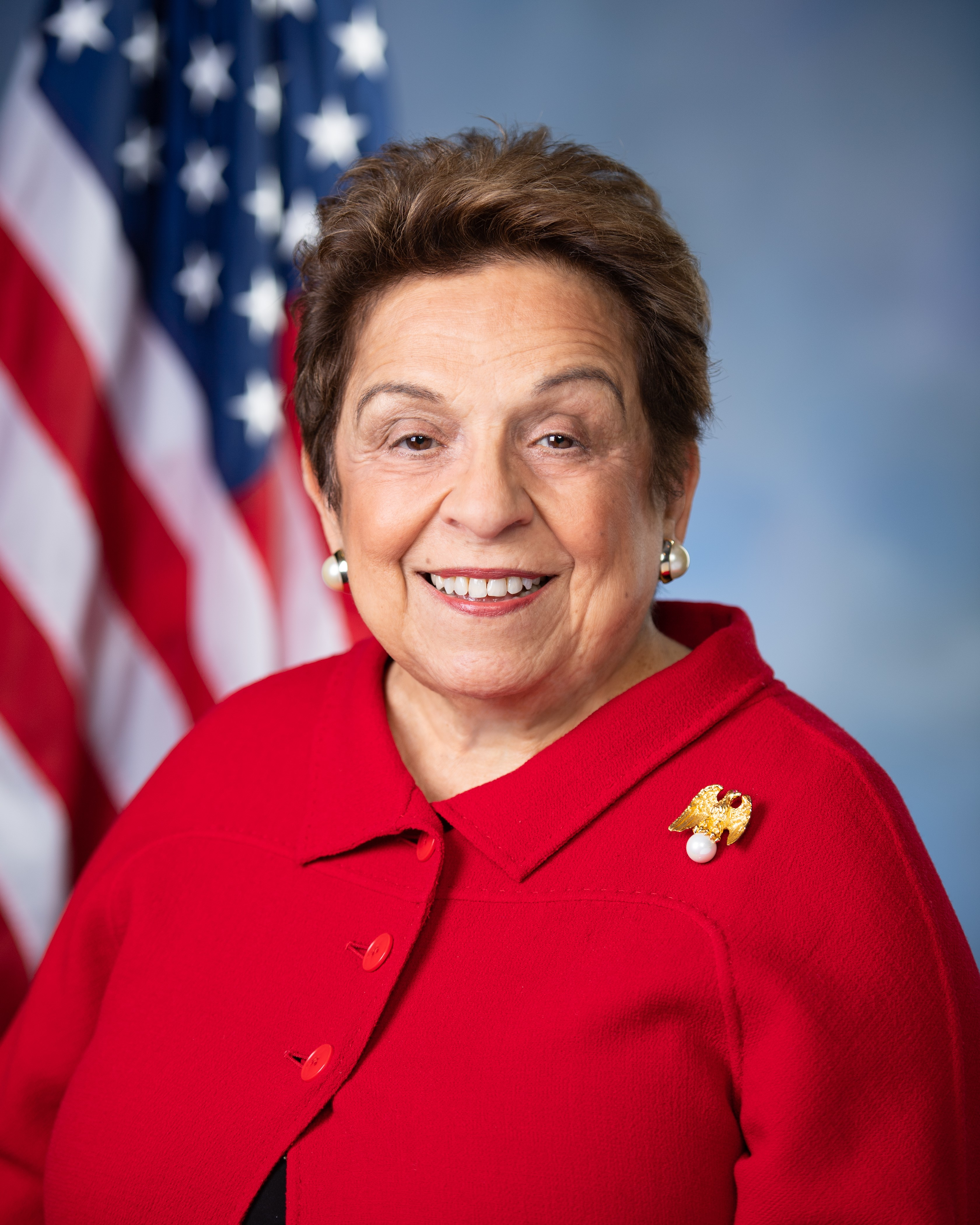
- Official portrait, 2019

President of The New School
- Acting
- In office August 16, 2023 – July 31, 2024
- Preceded by: Dwight A. McBride
- Succeeded by: Joel Towers

Member of the U.S. House of Representatives from Florida's 27th district
- In office January 3, 2019 – January 3, 2021
- Preceded by: Ileana Ros-Lehtinen
- Succeeded by: María Elvira Salazar

President of the Clinton Foundation
- In office March 6, 2015 – April 25, 2017
- Preceded by: Eric Braverman
- Succeeded by: Kevin Thurm

5th President of the University of Miami
- In office June 1, 2001 – August 16, 2015
- Preceded by: Edward T. Foote II
- Succeeded by: Julio Frenk

18th United States Secretary of Health and Human Services
- In office January 22, 1993 – January 20, 2001
- President: Bill Clinton
- Deputy: Walter Broadnax; Kevin Thurm
- Preceded by: Louis Wade Sullivan
- Succeeded by: Tommy Thompson

5th Chancellor of the University of Wisconsin, Madison
- In office January 1, 1988 – January 22, 1993
- Preceded by: Bernard Cecil Cohen
- Succeeded by: David Ward

10th President of Hunter College
- In office October 8, 1980 – January 1, 1988
- Preceded by: Jacqueline Wexler
- Succeeded by: Paul LeClerc

Assistant Secretary of Housing and Urban Development for Policy Development and Research
- In office April 1977 – October 8, 1980
- President: Jimmy Carter
- Preceded by: Jerry Fitts (acting)
- Succeeded by: Emanuel Savas

Personal details
- Born: Donna Edna Shalala; February 14, 1941 (age 85) Cleveland, Ohio, U.S.
- Party: Democratic
- Education: Western College (BA); Syracuse University (MA, PhD)
- Shalala's voice Shalala testifying on Bill Clinton's Medicare reform proposal. Recorded July 22, 1999

Donna Edna Shalala (/ʃəˈleɪlə/ shə-LAY-lə; born February 14, 1941) is an American former politician and academic who served as the U.S. representative for Florida's 27th congressional district from 2019 to 2021. She was the U.S. secretary of health and human services during the Clinton administration and served as assistant secretary of housing and urban development for policy development and research under Jimmy Carter. She is a member of the Democratic Party.

Shalala received a bachelor's degree in 1962 and served in the Peace Corps before earning a PhD from Syracuse University in 1970. She subsequently held faculty positions at Baruch College and Columbia University, and was appointed Assistant Secretary at the Department of Housing and Urban Development under President Jimmy Carter. She served as president of Hunter College from 1980 to 1988, then as chancellor of the University of Wisconsin–Madison. From 1993 to 2001, she served as U.S. Secretary of Health and Human Services under President Bill Clinton—the longest tenure in that role—and was the first Lebanese-American to hold a Cabinet position. She subsequently served as president of the University of Miami (2001–2015) and the Clinton Foundation (2015–2017). In 2008, she was awarded the Presidential Medal of Freedom.

Shalala was first elected to Congress in 2018. She served one term before losing re-election in 2020 to María Elvira Salazar in an upset. Shalala was interim president of The New School in New York City from 2023 to 2024.

== Early life and education ==
Shalala was born in Cleveland, Ohio, of Maronite Catholic Lebanese descent. Her father sold real estate; and her mother, one of the first Lebanese-Americans to graduate from Ohio State University, was a teacher who worked two jobs and attended law school at night. She has a twin sister, Diane Fritel.

Shalala attended West Technical High School where she was the editor of the school newspaper. She received a bachelor's degree in 1962 from Western College for Women. (Note: In 1976, Western College for Women merged with Miami University in Oxford, Ohio.) From 1962 to 1964, she was among the first volunteers to serve in the Peace Corps. Her placement took her to a rural farming village in southern Iran where she worked with other volunteers to construct an agricultural college. In 1970, she earned a Ph.D. from the Maxwell School of Citizenship and Public Affairs at Syracuse University in Syracuse, New York.

== Career ==
=== Teaching and Carter administration (1970–1988) ===
Shalala began her teaching career as a political science professor at Baruch College, part of the City University of New York, where she also was a member of the American Federation of Teachers union.

In 1972, Shalala became a professor of politics and education at Teachers College, Columbia University, a post she held until 1979. Shalala became the only woman on the Municipal Assistance Corporation, a group tasked with saving the city during the 1975 New York City fiscal crisis. Concurrently, from 1977 to 1980, she served as the assistant secretary for policy development and research at the U.S. Department of Housing and Urban Development during the Carter administration.

Shalala's first experience with academic administration came on October 8, 1980, when she became the tenth president of Hunter College, serving in this capacity until 1988.

=== University of Wisconsin–Madison chancellorship (1988–1993) ===
Shalala served as chancellor of the University of Wisconsin–Madison from 1988 to 1993. At the time of her chancellorship, the university included 42,000 students, employed 16,500 people, and had an annual budget of $1 billion. She was the first woman to lead a Big Ten Conference school and only the second woman in the country to head a major research university.

Under Shalala's chancellorship and with her support, the university adopted a broad speech code subjecting students to disciplinary action for communications that were perceived as hate speech. That speech code was later found unconstitutional by a federal judge. Also while chancellor, Shalala supported passage of a revised faculty speech code broadly restricting "harmful" speech in both "noninstructional" and "instructional" settings. The faculty speech code was abolished ten years later, after a number of professors were investigated for alleged or suspected violations.

=== U.S. Secretary of Health and Human Services (1993–2001) ===
Shalala with President Bill Clinton in April 1993

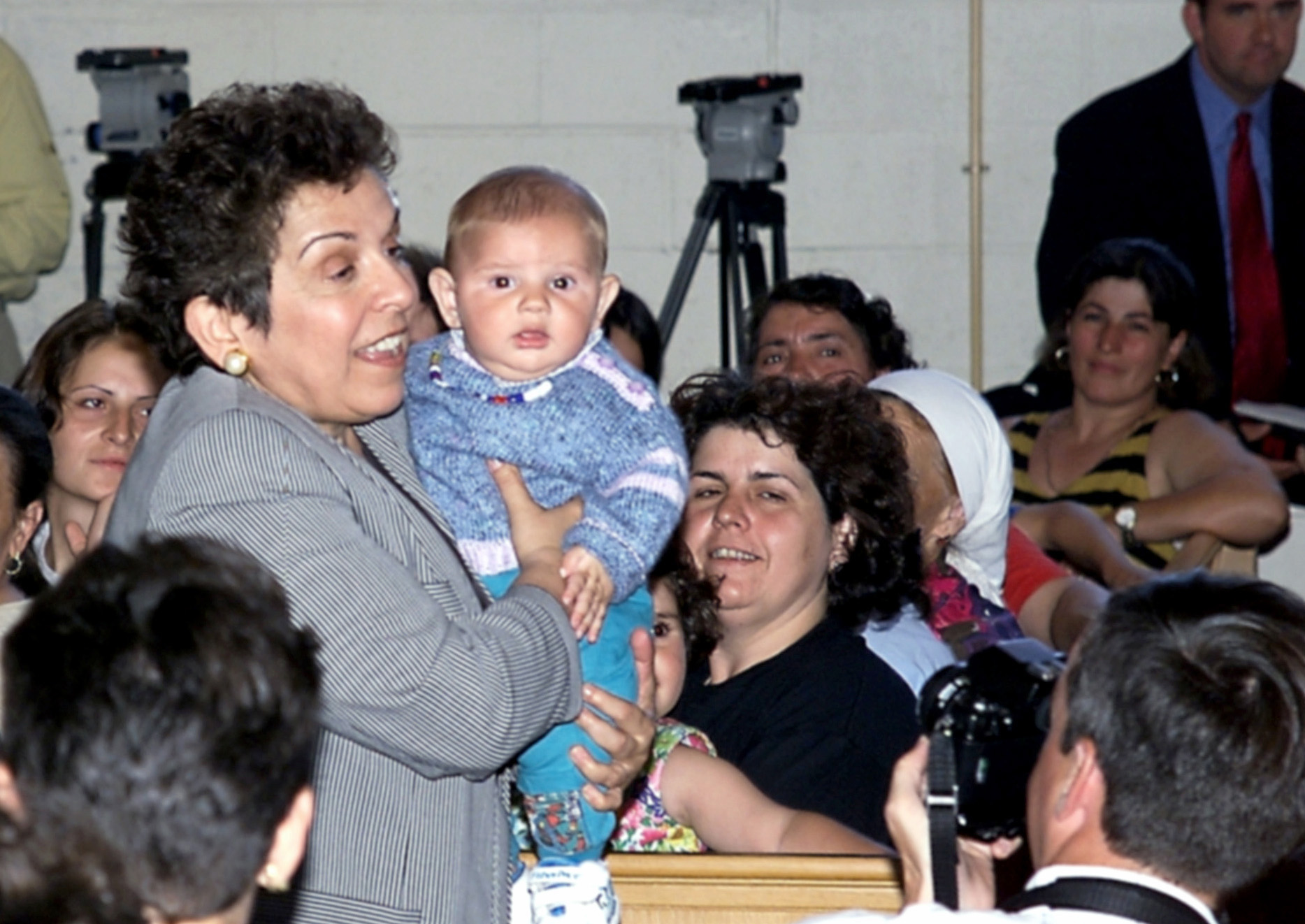
Shalala with Kosovo War refugees in 1999

Following a year serving as chair of the Children's Defense Fund (1992–1993), Shalala was nominated in 1992 by then President-elect Bill Clinton for the position of United States Secretary of Health and Human Services. The Washington Post labeled her "one of the most controversial Clinton Cabinet nominees". Her nomination went before the Senate Finance Committee in January 1993, and the Senate voted to confirm her on January 22, 1993. At the start of Shalala's tenure, the Department of Health and Human Services employed 125,000 people and had a budget of $539 billion.

Shalala served as HHS secretary for eight years during the Clinton administration, becoming the nation's longest-serving HHS secretary. In 1996, Shalala was the designated survivor during Clinton's State of the Union address. She is the first Lebanese-American to serve in a cabinet position.

=== Corporate boards (2001–2012) ===
In 2001, Shalala joined the boards of UnitedHealth and Lennar, where over the following decade she earned millions of dollars. Shalala was paid almost a half-million dollars in 2010 to serve on the boards of three companies, two of which were run by University of Miami trustees.

When she left Lennar in 2012, the company reported it was to avoid a "conflict of interest". Lennar's CEO, Stuart Miller, had joined the University of Miami Board of Trustees in 2002. Shalala rejoined Lennar in 2017 after she was no longer President of the University. She has also been member of the advisory board of the Peter G. Peterson Foundation.

=== University of Miami presidency (2001–2015) ===
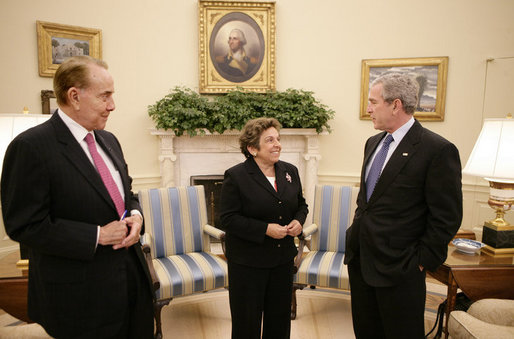
Shalala with President George W. Bush and former Senator Bob Dole prior to co-chairing the President's Commission on Care for America's Returning Wounded Warriors, 2007

In 2001, Shalala became president of the University of Miami. She created a University of Miami fundraising campaign, Momentum, designed to raise the university's endowment from approximately $750 million to $1 billion; the goal was later increased to $1.25 billion by the end of 2007.

Shalala faced criticism for her response to a nationally publicized custodial workers' strike at the University of Miami, which lasted from February 28, 2006, until May 1, 2006. Critics called the University of Miami's custodial workers among the lowest paid university-based custodians in the nation and alleged they were not earning a living wage. The strike prompted Shalala to raise wages. Shalala was also criticized for living in luxury while the custodians did not have health insurance. Shalala criticized union organizer's tactics, including a sit-in that she said prevented students from attending classes.

In 2013, the University of Miami sold 88 acres of undeveloped Pine Rocklands, one of the last remnants of the imperiled habitat in Miami-Dade County outside of Everglades National Park, to Ram Realty Services, for $22 million. Miami New Times described this amount as "a complete steal for the developer in light of the relative worth of nearby property." Also in 2013, Ram Realty and Lennar Corp worked on at least one project together in North Carolina. When Shalala ran for the US Congress in 2018, her candidacy was opposed by local environmentalists for her part in the sale of the University of Miami pine rocklands site.

On September 8, 2014, Shalala announced that she would be stepping down at the end of the 2014–2015 academic year.

=== Clinton Foundation (2015–2017) ===
In 2015, Shalala took a leave of absence from her tenured professorship at the University of Miami to volunteer for the Clinton Foundation. She followed her tenure as president of the University of Miami by being named chief executive officer of the Foundation, serving in that capacity from 2015 to 2017.

According to The New York Times, Chelsea Clinton helped persuade Shalala to leave the University of Miami, move to New York and head the foundation. Shalala maintained a home in Miami and taught part-time at the University of Miami while heading the foundation in New York.

Shalala led the Clinton Foundation during the 2016 presidential election, in which Hillary Clinton was a leading candidate and the propriety of the foundation's activity came under scrutiny. In a September 14, 2016, interview on MSNBC, Shalala admitted that there was "no question" that donors to the Clinton Foundation had been given "courtesy appointments" in the State Department while Hillary Clinton ran that department. Shalala oversaw the termination of the Clinton Global Initiative during her tenure as CEO, as well as other reductions in operations intended to avoid conflicts of interest if Clinton won the election. She resisted calls by The Washington Post and USA Today to shut down the foundation entirely, arguing that "there are human beings around the world who would be affected by these decisions." Shalala left the Clinton Foundation in April 2017 and returned to her full-time teaching position at the University of Miami, replacing her former HHS deputy Kevin Thurm.

Following a September 2015 Clinton Global Initiative event held at the Sheraton New York Hotel, Shalala fell ill. It was subsequently reported in a Clinton Foundation statement that she had suffered a stroke. In early 2018, she said she had recovered.

=== U.S. House of Representatives (2019–2021) ===
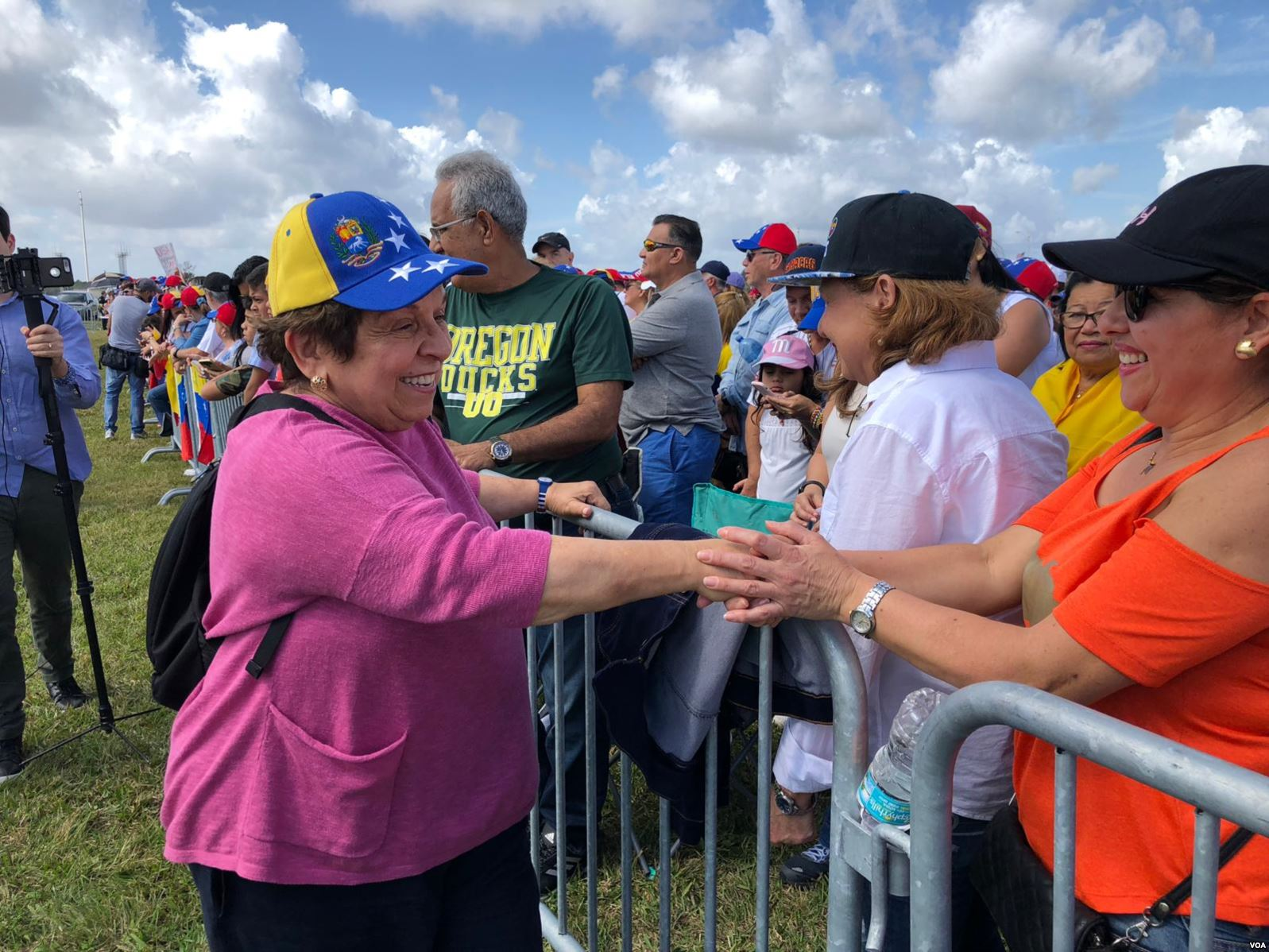
Shalala meeting Juan Guaidó supporters in Miami, 2019

==== Elections ====
In March 2018, Shalala declared her candidacy in the Democratic primary for Florida's 27th congressional district. The district included just over half of Miami as well as some of its eastern suburbs. The district voted for Clinton by a comfortable margin in the 2016 presidential election, but its House seat was held by 30-year incumbent Republican Ileana Ros-Lehtinen, who had announced that she would retire at the conclusion of her term.

In an interview with WFOR-TV, Shalala stated that she supported universal healthcare coverage, but opposed a Medicare For All single-payer healthcare system because she believed that individuals who liked their current employment-based healthcare plans should be able to keep them. On August 28, 2018, Shalala won the Democratic five-candidate primary over state Representative David Richardson. The outcome of the race was substantially closer than polling predicted, which had her leading consistently by double digits. She won with 31.9 percent of the vote, vs. 27.5% for Richardson.

Shalala ran against Republican candidate María Elvira Salazar, an anchorwoman for Miami Telemundo outlet WSCV, in the general election. Shalala's campaign emphasized her experience and sought to tie Salazar to President Donald Trump, who was unpopular in the district. As late as a month before the election, polls showed Shalala either behind or practically tied with Salazar. However, Shalala won the election at the age of 77, making her the third-oldest freshman Representative in history after William Lewis of Kentucky who was elected at the age of 79 in 1948 and James B. Bowler of Illinois who was elected at the age of 78 in 1953.

In the 2020 general election, Shalala ran against Republican Salazar again. On November 3, 2020, Shalala was defeated by Salazar. Salazar received 51.4% (176,141 votes) of the vote to Shalala's 48.6% (166,758 votes).

==== Tenure ====
Shalala was sworn in as a member of the 116th United States Congress on January 3, 2019.

On December 18, 2019, Shalala voted to impeach President Donald Trump.

On April 17, 2020, Shalala was appointed by House Speaker Nancy Pelosi to serve on the COVID-19 Congressional Oversight Commission to oversee the implementation of the CARES Act. The appointment was met with criticism; the Miami Herald reported that Shalala had violated the STOCK Act by failing to disclose more than 500 stock trades, but Shalala remained on the commission and paid a $1,200 fine to the United States House Committee on Ethics.

On September 28, 2020, the Miami Herald reported that Shalala failed to publicly report two additional stock trades in violation of the STOCK Act disclosure rules.

Shalala was named a vice-chair of the 2020 Democratic National Convention.

==== Committee assignments ====
- Committee on Education and Labor
  - Subcommittee on Early Childhood, Elementary and Secondary Education
  - United States House Education Subcommittee on Health, Employment, Labor, and Pensions
- Committee on Rules

==== Caucus memberships ====
- Congressional LGBT Equality Caucus
- Congressional Solar Caucus

=== Interim presidency at the New School (2023–2024) ===
Following the departure of Dwight A. McBride, Shalala was appointed as interim president of the New School, becoming the first female president of the university. Following student demands, Shalala's administration listed the property assigned to the president for $20 million. On October 9, 2023, Shalala came under harsh criticism from pro-Palestinian faculty and student groups after emailing a statement about the October 7 attacks that did not acknowledge lives lost in Gaza. The following morning, she issued another statement that included Palestinian recognition as well as an apology for her previous exclusion. The New School, like other universities, continue to be protested for connections to the Israeli occupation, including its 14-year association with the Center for Jazz Studies at the Israel Conservatory of Music.

=== Board memberships ===
Shalala served on the board of directors of the United States Soccer Federation. Shalala served as a member of the board of directors of Lennar. She served on the board of directors of Gannett Company from 2001 to 2011, retiring because of age limits.

In January 2012, the Chronicle of Higher Education reported on a potential conflict of interest involving Shalala's service on the boards of property development companies.

Shalala is a board member of CareSource, a managed care health insurance company based in Dayton, Ohio.

=== Civic activities ===
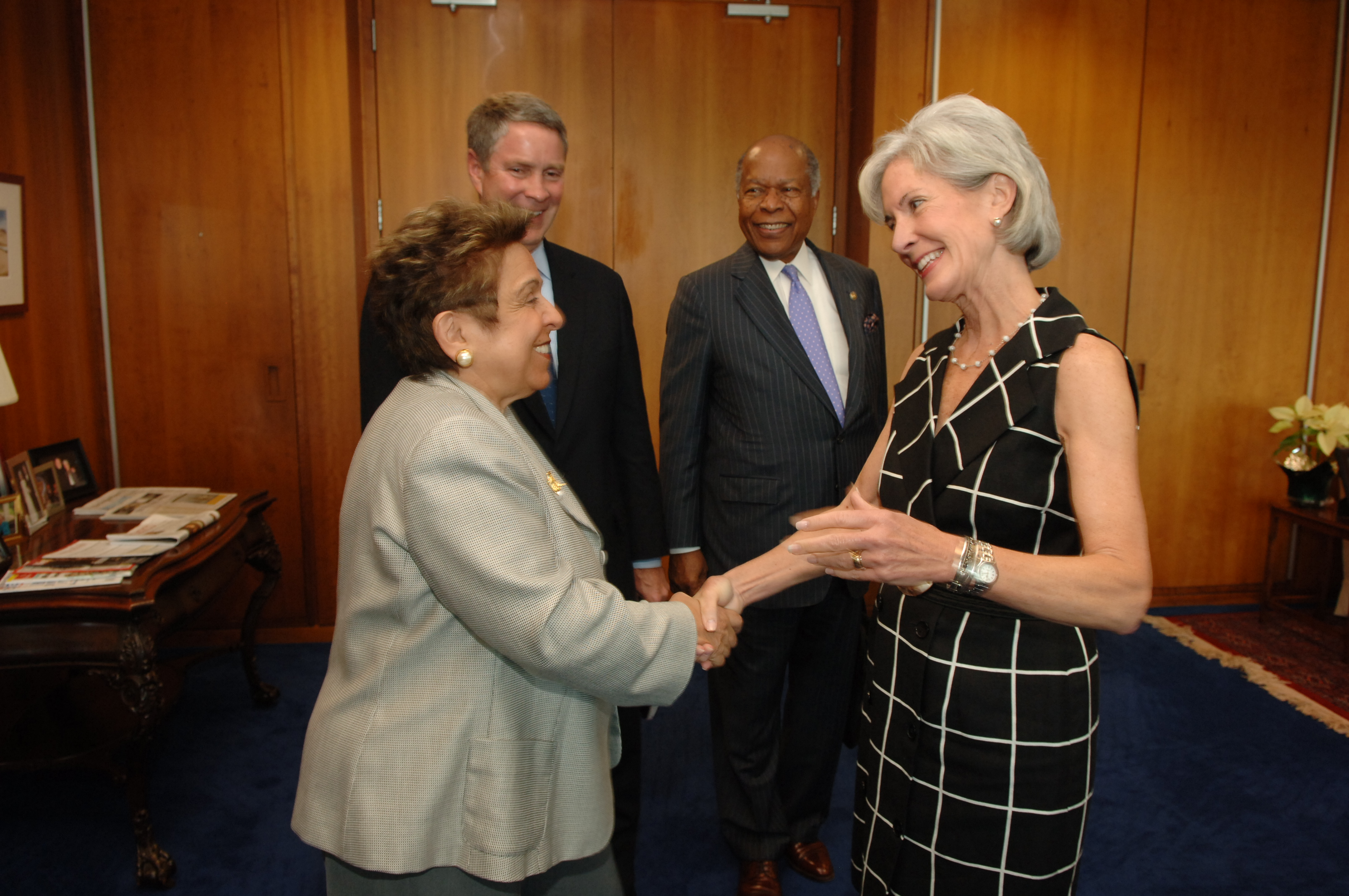
U.S. Secretary of Health and Human Services Kathleen Sebelius (right), Shalala (left), former Senate Majority Leader Bill Frist and former HHS Secretary Louis Wade Sullivan (background) in June 2010

In 1985, Shalala became a founding member of EMILY's List, a political action committee that seeks to elect pro-choice Democratic women to office. Shalala served from 2001 to 2007 on the board of the Albert Shanker Institute, a small, three-member staff organization named for the former head of the American Federation of Teachers. She is an honorary board member of the American Iranian Council, an organization that seeks to improve Iran–United States relations.

Shalala serves as a co-leader of the Nutrition and Physical Activity Initiative at the Bipartisan Policy Center. She serves as a distinguished senior fellow in the Economic Studies Program and the Engelberg Center for Health Care Reform at the Brookings Institution. She is also a member of Inter-American Dialogue, a Washington D.C.–based think tank.

Shalala also served as a panelist on the Blue Ribbon Study Panel on Biodefense, a working group of former high-ranking government officials and academic experts that put together a set of recommendations regarding the United States' defense capabilities against biological threats.

=== Honors and awards ===
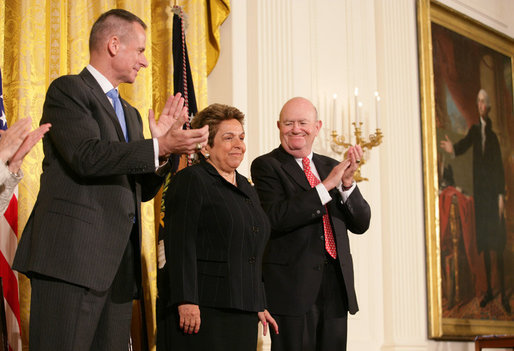
Shalala receiving the Presidential Medal of Freedom in 2008

At the University of Miami, Shalala was inducted the Iron Arrow Honor Society, the highest honor bestowed by the University of Miami. In 2002, she was inducted into Omicron Delta Kappa.

On June 19, 2008, Shalala was awarded the Presidential Medal of Freedom by President George W. Bush. In 2010, she received the Nelson Mandela Award for Health and Human Rights. She was inducted into the National Women's Hall of Fame in Seneca Falls, New York in 2011. In 2014, she was recognized by the Harry S Truman Library and Museum with the Harry S Truman Legacy of Leadership Award. In 2019, Shalala was announced as one of the members of the inaugural class of the Government Hall of Fame.

Shalala has been awarded more than 50 honorary degrees.

In July 2026, Shalala received the Education Legacy Award by the Coral Gables Community Education Foundation to commemorate her work in higher education and philanthropy.

== See also ==
- List of Arab and Middle Eastern Americans in the United States Congress
- List of female United States Cabinet members
- Women in the United States House of Representatives

== Notes ==
Academic offices
Preceded by Jacqueline Wexler	President of Hunter College; 1980–1988	Succeeded by Paul LeClerc
Preceded by Bernard Cecil Cohen	Chancellor of the University of Wisconsin, Madison; 1988–1993	Succeeded by David Ward
Preceded by Edward Foote	President of the University of Miami; 2001–2015	Succeeded by Julio Frenk
Preceded by Dwight A. McBride	President of The New School; Acting; 2023–2024	Succeeded by Joel Towers
Political offices
Preceded by Louis Wade Sullivan	United States Secretary of Health and Human Services; 1993–2001	Succeeded by Tommy Thompson
Non-profit organization positions
Preceded by Eric Braverman	President of the Clinton Foundation; 2015–2017	Succeeded by Kevin Thurm
U.S. House of Representatives
Preceded by Ileana Ros-Lehtinen	Member of the U.S. House of Representatives from Florida's 27th congressional district 2019–2021	Succeeded by Maria Elvira Salazar
U.S. order of precedence (ceremonial)
Preceded by Mike Espy as Former U.S. Cabinet Member	Order of precedence of the United States as Former U.S. Cabinet Member	Succeeded by Henry Cisneros as Former U.S. Cabinet Member
