= Timothy S. Healy =

American Jesuit academic administrator (1923–1992)

The Reverend Timothy S. Healy SJ
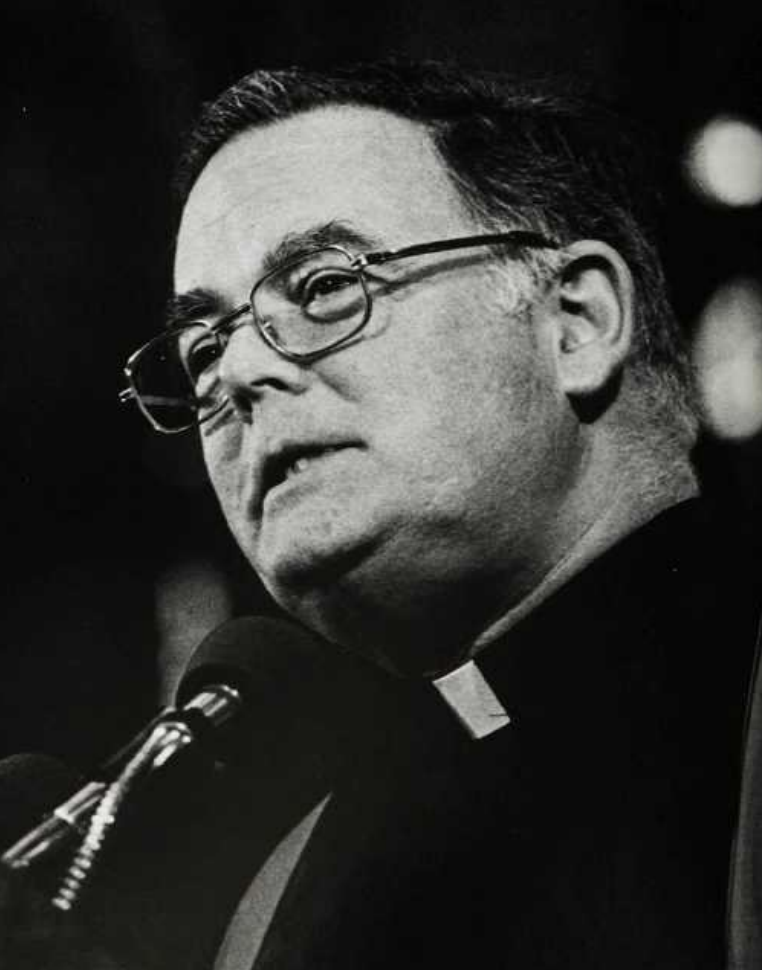
- Healy in 1977

10th President of the New York Public Library
- In office 1989–1992
- Preceded by: Vartan Gregorian
- Succeeded by: Paul LeClerc

46th President of Georgetown University
- In office 1976–1989
- Preceded by: Robert J. Henle
- Succeeded by: Leo J. O'Donovan

Personal details
- Born: April 25, 1923 New York City, U.S.
- Died: December 30, 1992 (aged 69) Elizabeth, New Jersey, U.S.
- Resting place: Jesuit Community Cemetery
- Education: Woodstock College (BA); Catholic University of Leuven (STL); Fordham University (MA); University of Oxford (DPhil)

Academic background
- Thesis: John Donne's Ignatius His Conclave: An Edition of the Latin and English Texts with Introduction and Commentary (1965)

Orders
- Ordination: 1953

Timothy Stafford Healy SJ (April 25, 1923 – December 30, 1992) was an American Catholic priest and Jesuit who straddled the religious and secular life, serving as the vice chancellor of the City University of New York, the president of Georgetown University, and the president of the New York Public Library.

Born in New York City, Healy entered the Society of Jesus and began teaching. He eventually became the executive vice president at Fordham University, before being named the vice chancellor for academic affairs of CUNY in 1969. It was highly unusual for a Catholic priest to hold a senior administrative role at an American public university. Entering the job during a time of intense student protests, Healy was responsible for implementing the university system's open admissions policy.

In 1976, Healy left CUNY to become the president of Georgetown University. During his tenure, Georgetown rose to a position of national prominence, especially its law school, medical center, and School of Foreign Service. The number and quality of applicants increased, and admission became much more selective. Healy undertook an extensive building campaign and increased the size of the university's endowment sixfold. This prominence was furthered by the men's basketball team's 1984 NCAA Championship. However, facing declining admissions, the School of Dentistry closed in 1990.

Healy became the president of the New York Public Library in 1989. The appointment of a Catholic priest to the position drew criticism by some, while others rejected such criticism as being motivated by anti-Catholicism. Healy nearly doubled the library's endowment, opened the Science, Industry and Business Library, and sought to improve access to the local branches by poor children.

== Early life ==
Timothy Stafford Healy was born on April 25, 1923, in the borough of Manhattan in New York City. His father, Reginald Healy, was an Australian who emigrated to the United States to study petroleum engineering in Texas, after serving in the Australian Army during World War I, including in the Gallipoli campaign. His mother, Margaret Healy née Vaeth, was a schoolteacher in Gainesville, Texas. Reginald and Margaret moved to New York City, where Reginald managed the finances of a small oil company. He took on various jobs after the company's collapse in 1929, during the Great Depression.

=== Education ===
Healy graduated from Regis High School in 1939, and entered the Society of Jesus the following year, despite his parents' initial misgivings. He began his higher studies at Woodstock College in Maryland, where he received degrees in English literature and philosophy. He spent four years at the Catholic University of Louvain in Belgium, receiving a Licentiate of Sacred Theology. He then completed a year of postgraduate work at the University of Valencia in Spain. Healy returned to the United States and taught English at Fordham Preparatory School in the Bronx. In 1953, he was ordained a priest, and he received his Master of Arts in English literature from Fordham University. He then completed his education in 1965 at the University of Oxford, earning a Doctor of Philosophy in English literature. His doctoral thesis, titled John Donne's Ignatius His Conclave: An Edition of the Latin and English Texts with Introduction and Commentary, was published by Oxford University Press.

Healy returned to Fordham University, where he began teaching. Shortly thereafter, the Jesuit superiors at Fordham noticed his potential as an administrator. First named the director of alumni relations, he rose to become the executive vice president of the university. In this office, he was responsible for increasing the number of minority students at Fordham. In 1968, Healy attempted to establish a new liberal arts college for poor students in the Bedford–Stuyvesant neighborhood of Brooklyn; this project did not materialize for lack of funds.

== City University of New York ==
In 1969, Healy was appointed the vice chancellor for academic affairs of the City University of New York. The arrangement of a Catholic priest occupying a senior administrative role at an American public university was highly atypical; Healy donated the salary he drew from CUNY to the Jesuits and lived at America House, the Jesuit residence in Manhattan.

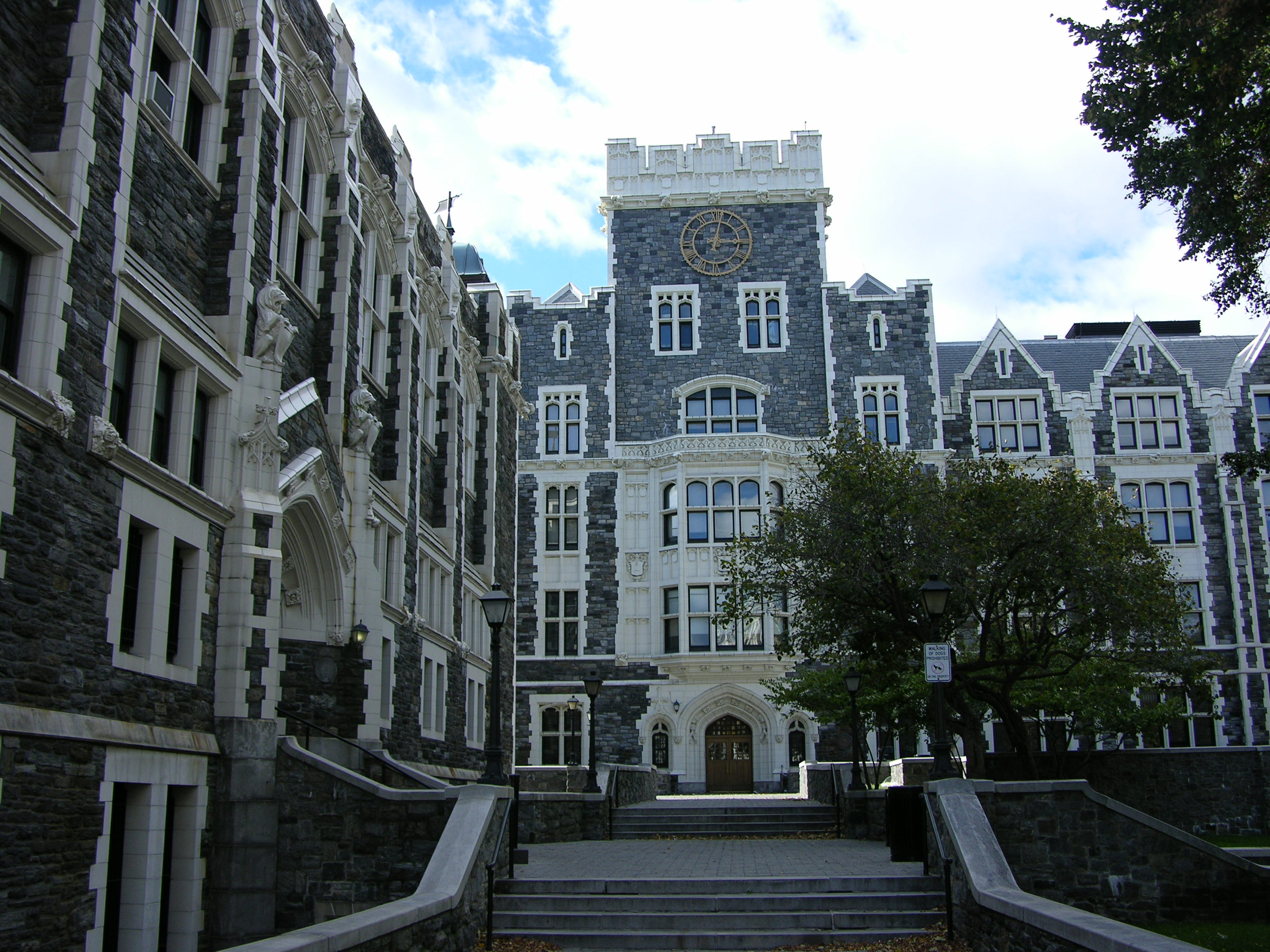
The City College of New York, one of CUNY's senior colleges, was occupied for weeks in 1969.

Healy saw as his primary mission the return of CUNY to its founding purpose: the education of the poor. At the time he assumed office, there was an ongoing controversy over whether to implement an open admissions plan, which would guarantee every graduate of a New York City high school admission to a CUNY college, regardless of their academic performance. That year, CUNY, as well as the entire city government, faced a budgetary crisis so severe that the chancellor, Albert H. Bowker, announced that without outside funding from New York State, no freshman class could be admitted in 1969. At the same time, black and Puerto Rican students increasingly protested what they considered inadequate representation at CUNY colleges. The significant majority of students at the City College of New York and CUNY's other senior colleges at that time were Jewish.

Tensions came to a head on April 22, 1969, when black and Puerto Rican students took over the City College campus, demanding, among other things, the creation of a separate CUNY school for black and Puerto Rican studies, separate orientation programs for these two groups, and admission of the same percentage of black and Puerto Rican students as comprised the New York City public schools. As the occupation continued for weeks, the subject became a politically contentious issue in the mayor's and governor's offices, as well as among the city's congressional representatives. In July, CUNY's board of trustees voted to introduce an open admissions policy. Healy was charged with implementing this policy.

The open admissions policy came to be considered largely a failure, as low retention rates of black and Puerto Rican students resulted in minimal racial integration of CUNY, a significant portion of the student body required remedial education, and applications from the top students at New York high schools declined precipitously, all of which resulted in diminished academic quality. Nonetheless, by the end of Healy's tenure in 1976, the percentage of minority students at CUNY rose from 5% to 30%. In 1973, Healy again sought to establish a new college. A part of the State University of New York, it would educate prison inmates. However, this proposal never came to fruition.

== Georgetown University ==
On April 14, 1976, Healy was named the president of Georgetown University, succeeding Robert J. Henle. The committee's ambitious desire for their new president was someone who would create a long-term vision for the university, dramatically expand its fundraising, and became a national spokesman for Georgetown and private higher education more generally.

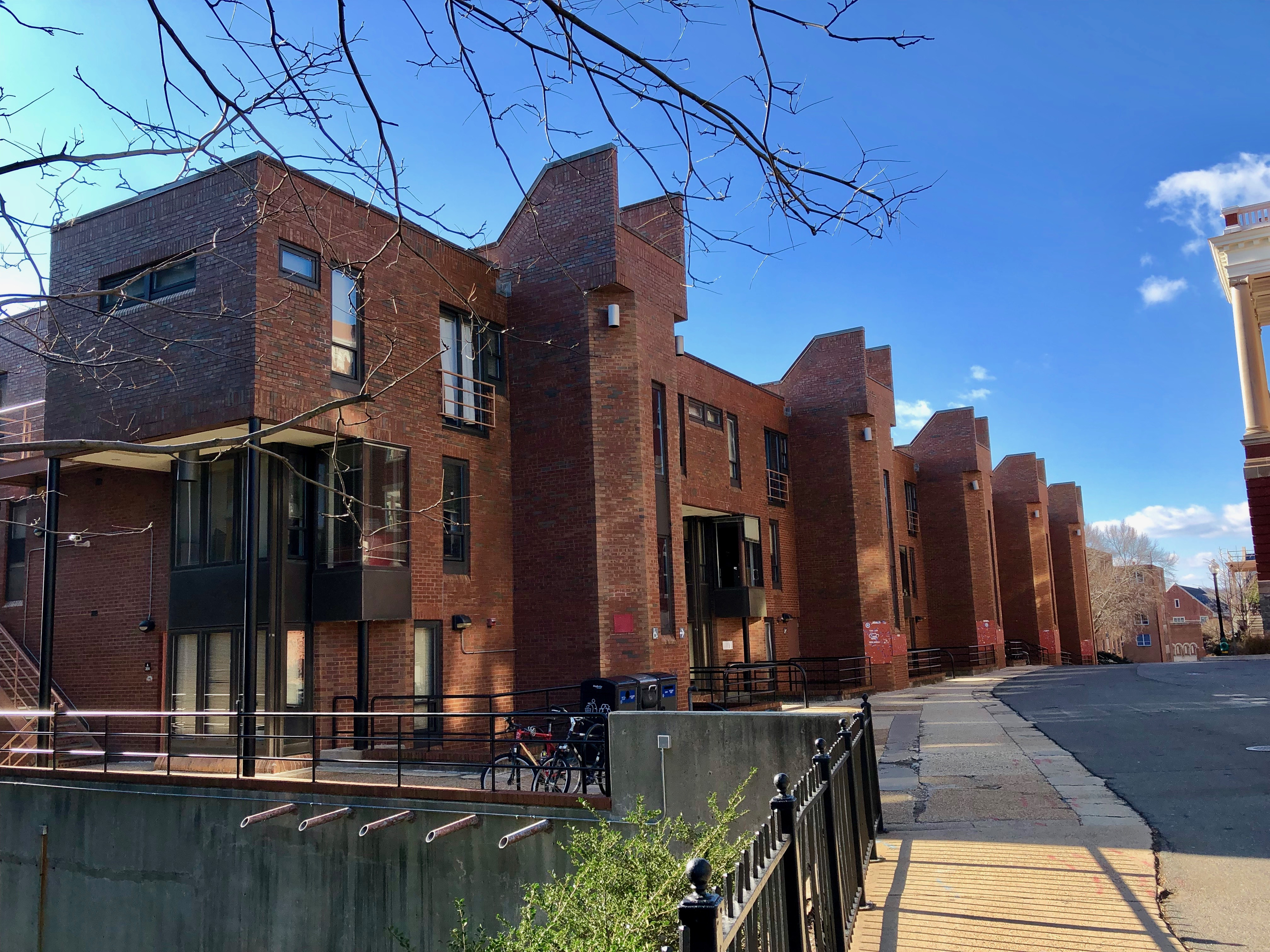
Healy oversaw construction of Village A and two other student housing complexes.

During his 13-year tenure, Georgetown emerged into the national spotlight as a top institution. Upon entering office, he determined that the two areas in which the university lagged behind peer institutions were the physical development of the main campus and the university's endowment. Therefore, an ambitious building campaign during his tenure resulted in 12 new buildings. Among these were Yates Field House, an athletic center for the general student body; the Bunn Intercultural Center, a new home for many academic departments and the School of Foreign Service; three new students housing complexes, Villages A, B, and C; and the Leavey Center, a university center that included a hotel. Despite the rapid development of the physical campus, Georgetown's growth soon resulted in a campus without room for additional physical expansion.

To support this era of expansion, Healy promoted aggressive growth of the university's endowment, which stood at $37 million when he took office. Within two years, the endowment had tripled, and Georgetown had outpaced every other university in the country in its financial growth. By the end of his term, the endowment had increased to $230 million. Healy became well-connected with The Washington Post and The Washington Star, sat on numerous U.S. presidential commissions, and assumed prominent leadership roles in national collegiate organizations. Healy delivered the invocation at the second presidential inauguration of Ronald Reagan in 1985. In 1986, he was named one of the five most-effective university presidents in the United States.

=== Rise to prominence ===
With the rise of Georgetown's academic caliber came a rapid increase in the selectivity of its admissions. The number of applicants increased by 2.5 times during Healy's presidency, and the acceptance rate dropped from 44% in 1975 to 20% in 1986, making it one of the most selective universities in the country. The average SAT scores of admitted students increased, which together with a concerted effort to broaden geographic recruitment, resulted in a student body that was increasingly drawn from around the country and the world. The religious and ethnic diversity of the school increased as well. Healy adamantly opposed racism and instituted a campaign to recruit black students, particularly from Washington, D.C. During Healy's presidency, the university saw great athletic success as well, particularly in basketball, track, and rowing. In 1984, the Georgetown Hoyas men's basketball team won the NCAA tournament, under the leadership of coach John Thompson. A secret society, the Society of Stewards, was founded in 1982, composed of prominent student leaders on campus.

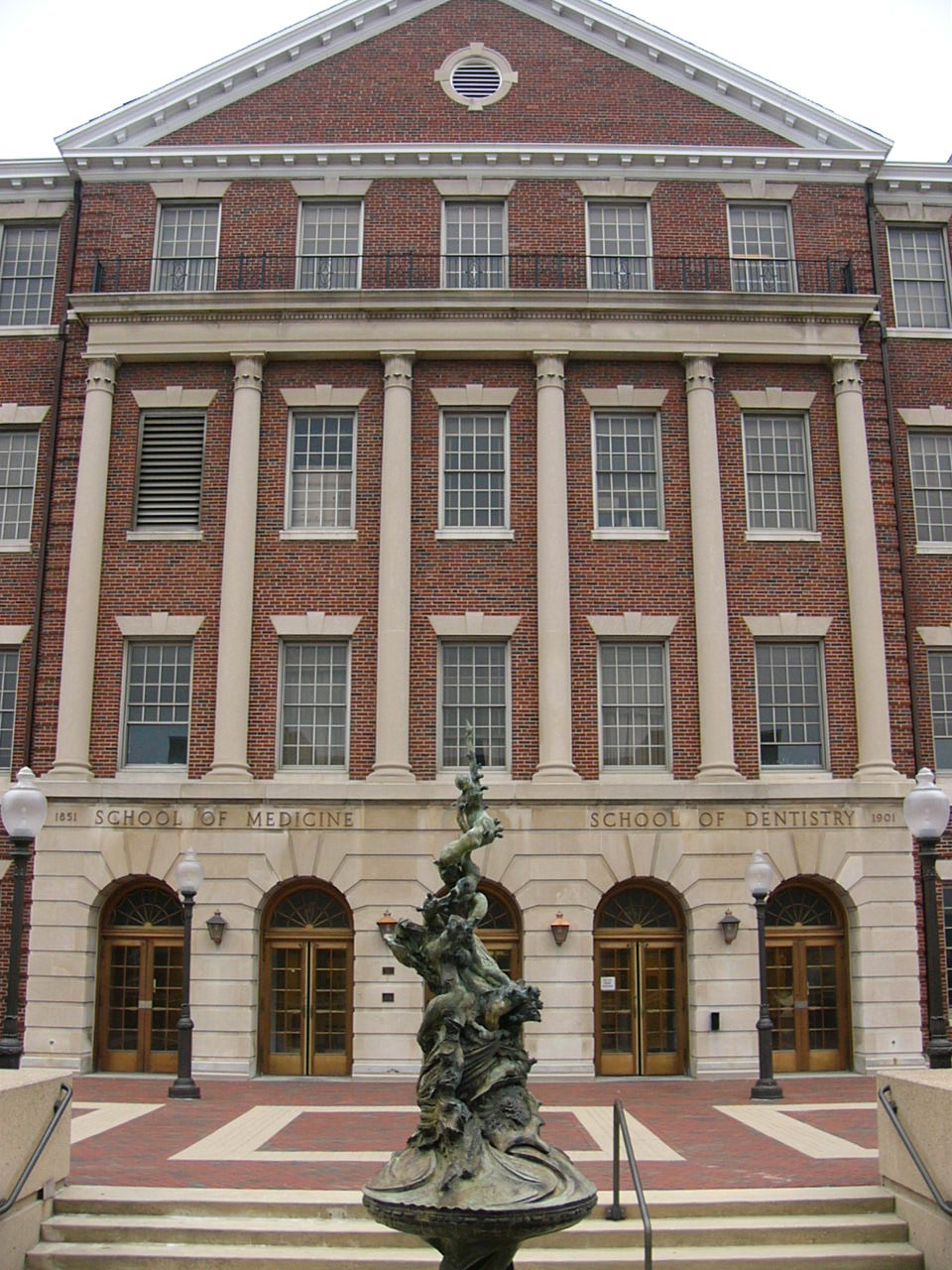
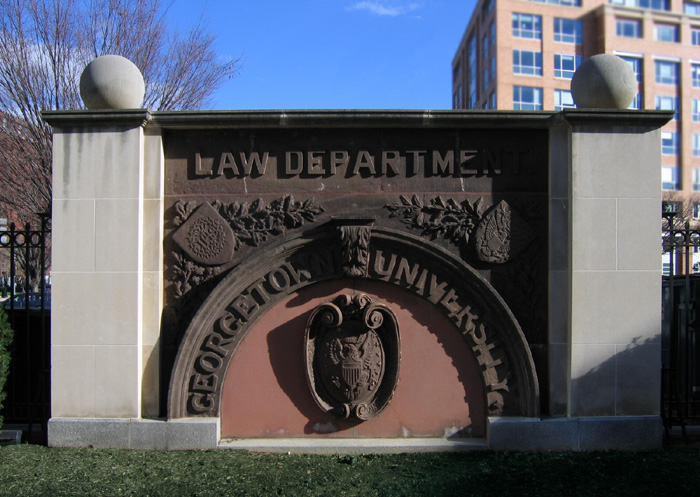
Both the medical center and law school saw significant growth.

With the increase in the caliber of students came an uptick in the number of graduates receiving prestigious awards, such as the Rhodes and Marshall scholarships. Even more so than the university generally, the national reputations of the School of Foreign Service and the School of Business improved dramatically. The Georgetown University Law Center became one of the most-prominent law schools in the nation, and the Georgetown University Medical Center, particularly the Lombardi Cancer Center, became a leading research institution. At the same time, the School of Dentistry was part of a nationwide trend of a diminishing number and quality of applicants. The problem became so severe that Healy decided to close the school in 1987, and it graduated its final class in 1990.

One contentious issue during Healy's presidency was the sale of the university's radio station, WGTB, to the University of the District of Columbia for $1. Prior to Healy's term, the station, though owned by the university, had been effectively operated by people unaffiliated with the university, who broadcast content that was deemed offensive by Georgetown's board of directors and the Federal Communications Commission. As a result, the FCC was considering denying the renewal of WGTB's license. With the board's authorization, Healy sold the license in 1979, despite protests of students and the faculty senate. Though a lifelong Democrat who offered prayers at party meetings and frequently criticized President Ronald Reagan, Healy was criticized by the left. Adhering to Catholic doctrine, he refused official university recognition and subsidization of a gay student group, which prompted a lawsuit. After seven years of litigation, the District of Columbia Court of Appeals ruled that the group must receive the same material benefits as other students groups, but that the university could not be compelled to give it official endorsement. Contrary to the wishes of the Archdiocese of Washington, Healy declined to appeal the case to the U.S Supreme Court, stating that he desired to "pull the community back together." Healy's tenure as president came to an end in 1989, and he was succeeded by Leo J. O'Donavan.

== New York Public Library ==
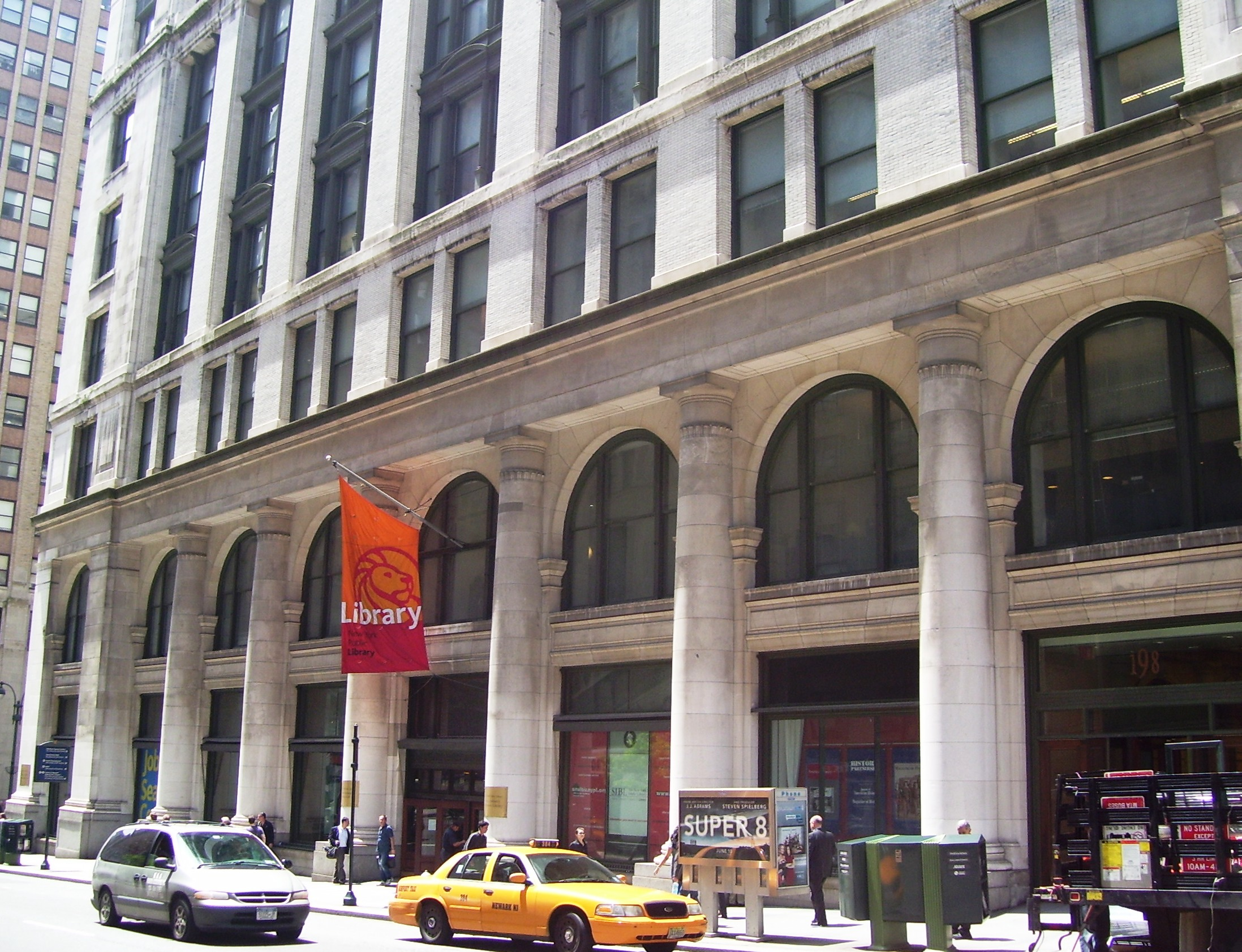
Healy's plan included the establishment of the Science, Industry and Business Library.

In February 1989, Healy resigned as president of Georgetown to become the president of the New York Public Library. A gregarious personality, he was recruited to the position in part because of his success in lobbying while at Georgetown. Succeeding the popular Vartan Gregorian, Healy's appointment generated controversy. Some prominent writers, such as Gay Talese and Joseph Heller, opposed his appointment to head the library, alleging that a Catholic priest could not commit to upholding free expression, while Craig Davidson, the executive director of the Gay & Lesbian Alliance Against Defamation, said Healy's involvement in the lawsuit concerning gay student groups at Georgetown should preclude him from holding the office. Others, such as the chancellor of CUNY, Joseph S. Murphy, argued these critics were motivated by anti-Catholicism. Healy himself stated that he opposed censorship and that he was not bound by any ecclesiastical authority in his capacity as head of the library.

Rather than his clerical attire, Healy wore a business suit, as he had done at CUNY. He donated most of his $150,000 salary to the Jesuits, retaining a small amount for his living expenses. He also forwent the ample apartment on the Upper East Side that the library provided for its president, preferring to live in a more modest one in Midtown also owned by the library; he often spent time at America House. In correspondence, he adopted the style "Dr. Healy", rather than "Fr. Healy".

As president of the library, Healy frequented traveled to Washington to lobby for additional federal funding of libraries in general and of the New York Public Library in particular. During his tenure, he increased the library's endowment from $170 million to $220 million. Like at CUNY, he sought to improve the library's service of the poor. Therefore, one of his main focuses was on the improvement of the library system's local branches (rather than the grand Main Branch), which were plagued by crime and open drug use, and on improving poor children's access to them. He also put into place a five-year plan for expanding the library system, which included establishing a new research branch, the Science, Industry and Business Library.

In addition to his role at the public library, Healy continued to teach at Georgetown for the rest of his life and was an avid Latinist, particularly interested in Virgil. He also remained fluent in French and Spanish from his studies in Europe. In 1983, he underwent open-heart surgery. On December 30, 1992, Healy suffered a heart attack in Newark Liberty International Airport while returning from a vacation in Scottsdale, Arizona. He was taken to Elizabeth General Medical Center in Elizabeth, New Jersey, where he was pronounced dead. His funeral was held at the Church of St. Ignatius Loyola in Manhattan, and his body was returned to Georgetown, where he was buried in the Jesuit Community Cemetery. He was succeeded as president of the public library by Paul LeClerc.

Academic offices
Preceded by –	Vice Chancellor for Academic Affairs of the City University of New York; 1969–1976	Succeeded by –
Preceded by Robert J. Henle	46th President of Georgetown University; 1976–1989	Succeeded by Leo J. O'Donovan
Cultural offices
Preceded by Vartan Gregorian	10th President of the New York Public Library; 1989–1992	Succeeded by Paul LeClerc
