= President's Commission on Care for America's Returning Wounded Warriors =

History
- Other short titles: Dole-Shalala Commission
- Established by: George W. Bush on March 6, 2007
- Related Executive Order number(s): 13426

Jurisdiction
- Purpose: Examine and recommend improvements to the effectiveness and quality of transition from to return to military service or civilian society

Summary
- 1. Create comprehensive recovery plans 2. Restructure disability and compensation systems 3. Prevent and treat PTSD and TBI; 4. Strengthen support for families 5. Rapidly transfer patient information between DoD and VA; 6. Strengthen recruitment and retention of Walter Reed Army Medical Center staff

The President's Commission on Care for America's Returning Wounded Warriors, also known as the Dole-Shalala Commission, was established on March 6, 2007, when U.S. President George W. Bush signed Executive Order 13426. The Commission was established to examine and recommend improvements to the effectiveness and quality of transition from returning to military service or civilian society, health care, benefits, outreach to service members, and awareness among service members of healthcare and benefits programs.

== Work process ==
The Commissioners visited the United States Department of Defense (DoD), United States Department of Veterans Affairs (VA), and private-sector treatment facilities; interviewed injured service members and their families, health care professionals, and program managers; conducted a survey of injured service members; reviewed letters and emails from Service members, veterans, family members, and health care personnel; and analyzed recommendations of past commissions and task forces. This Commission had the unique task of evaluating the entire continuum of care instead of analyzing discrete systems and processes as similar commissions had done.

== Findings ==
The Commission found consistent reports of high-quality battlefield medicine care provided by military and VA medical staff. Many of the report's findings focused on "seriously injured" service members, as identified by receipt of the one-time payment from Traumatic Servicemembers' Group Life Insurance to severely injured service members.

The Commission found a strong correlation between the feedback received about DoD/VA health care and the feedback typically received about health care from the private sector, such as poor care coordination and continuity, ineffective information technology systems, enduring stigma threatening those who seek mental health care, and inadequate long-term rehabilitation and staff shortages.

== Recommendations ==
This Commission made six recommendations with "action steps" to implement each recommendation. Also, each "action step" directs specific action roles to the VA, DoD, United States Congress, or some combination of these three entities.

1. Immediately Create Comprehensive Recovery Plans to Provide the Right Care and Support at the Right Time in the Right Place
  - Develop integrated care teams
  - Create Recovery Plans
  - Develop corps of Recovery Coordinators (with Public Health Service)
2. Completely Restructure the Disability and Compensation Systems
  - Clarify the objectives of DoD and VA disability programs
  - Create a single, comprehensive medical exam
  - Provide lifetime TRICARE benefits for combat-injured
  - Restructure VA disability payments
  - Determine appropriate length and amounts of transition payments
  - Update and keep current the disability rating schedule
  - Develop flexibility within Vocational Rehabilitation and Education (VRE) program
3. Aggressively Prevent and Treat Post-Traumatic Stress Disorder and Traumatic Brain Injury
  - Enable all Iraq & Afghanistan veterans who need PTSD care to receive it from the VA
  - Address shortage in mental health professionals
  - Establish and expand networks of experts in PTSD and TBI
  - Expand training regarding PTSD and TBI
  - Develop or disseminate clinical practice guidelines
4. Significantly Strengthen Support for Families
  - Expand eligibility for TRICARE respite care and aide and attendant care
  - Expand caregiver training for families
  - Cover family members under the Family Medical Leave Act
5. Rapidly Transfer Patient Information Between DoD and VA
  - Make patient information available to all personnel who need it, initially in readable form
  - Continue efforts for a fully interoperable information system
  - Develop a user-friendly single web portal for service members and veterans
6. Strongly Support Walter Reed By Recruiting and Retaining First-Rate Professionals Through 2011
  - Assure adequate resources
  - Strengthen recruitment and retention of needed administrative and clinical staff

== Press coverage ==
- 25 July 2007 - Panel Calls for Changes in Military Medical Care National Public Radio coverage of final report of the President's Commission on Care for America's Returning Wounded Warriors.
