= University of Miami Justice for Janitors campaign =

Nine-week strike by custodial workers in 2006

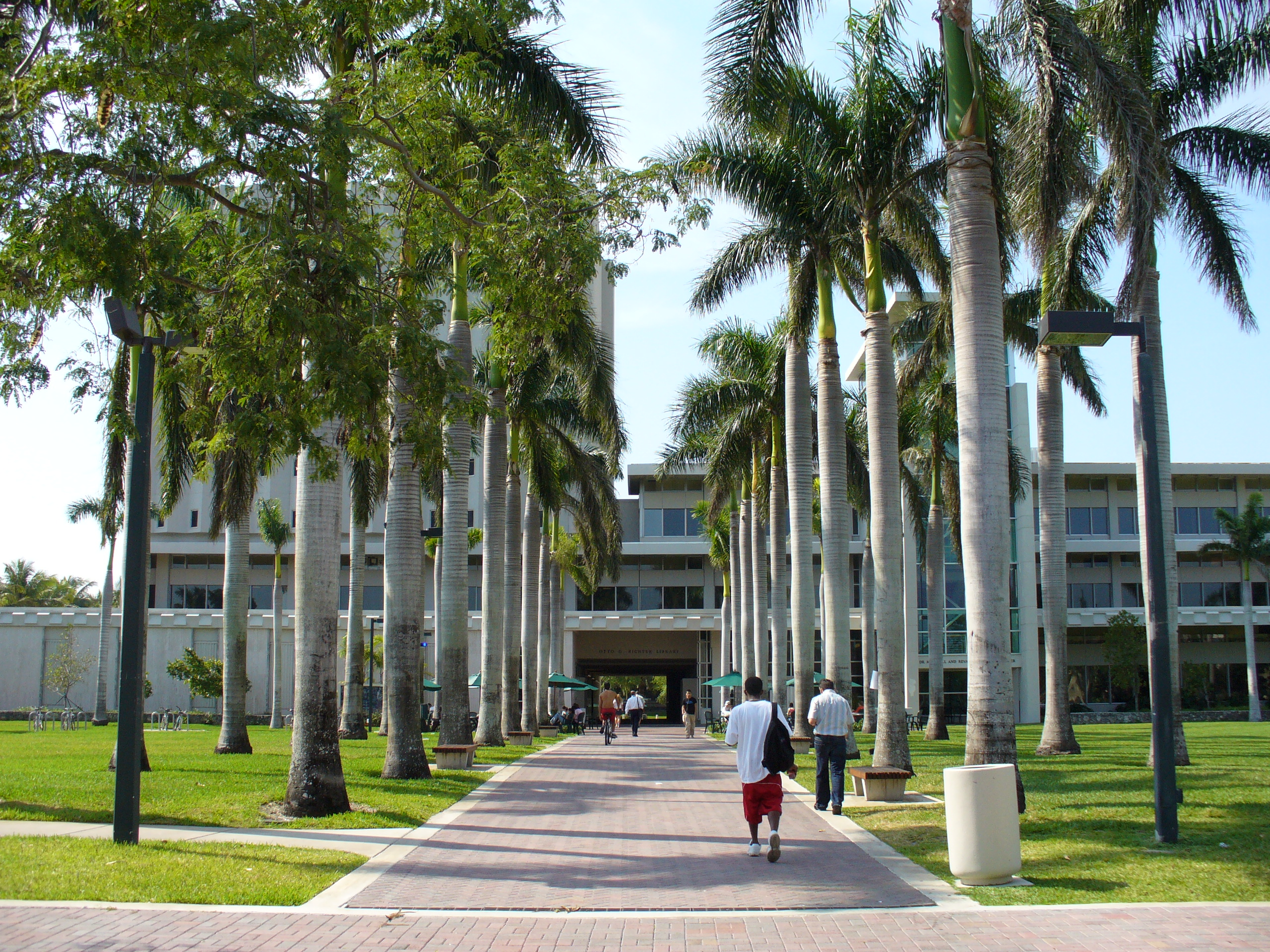
The University of Miami in Coral Gables, Florida in April 2006

The University of Miami Justice for Janitors campaign was a nine-week strike by custodial workers at the University of Miami in Coral Gables, Florida, which lasted from February 28 to May 3, 2006.

The campaign featured striking custodial workers challenging UNICCO, a company that provides maintenance, facility management, and cleaning and janitorial services for industrial, office, retail, and education facilities. The custodial workers sought a living wage, affordable health insurance, and better working conditions for Service Employees International Union (SEIU) member employees.

== Background ==
Prior to the 2006 strike at the University of Miami, UNICCO, now UGL, then a Boston-based company, had already drawn negative attention for some of its business practices. From 1999-2001, four deaths and one serious injury of UNICCO employees were reported in separate incidents. In 2003, two employees died in an incident at a workplace in Boston. Investigations of these incidents indicated that UNICCO was in violation of numerous workplace standards and resulted in the National Council for Occupational Safety and Health placing UNICCO on its "Workplace Health and Safety Dirty Dozen Report." A salary survey for 1999-2000 conducted by The Chronicle of Higher Education found University of Miami custodial workers to be the second lowest in pay ($13,120/year) and the University of Miami to be one of only 12 universities among 195 surveyed whose custodial workers' wages did not exceed the U.S. federal poverty line.

David Liberman, the senior vice president for business and finance at University of Miami at the time, stated, "we don't raise any questions about their business…[and] allow them to pay whatever they want to pay as long as they can recruit and retain workers, and still make a buck at the end of the day."

In response to this report, the University of Miami Faculty Senate began addressing the issue in October 2001. In two separate resolutions, passed on October 24 and December 12 that year, the faculty senate recommended that University of Miami president Donna Shalala change its policies for companies that provided contracted labor to the university. But The Faculty Senate recommendations went unheeded.

== Campaign ==
Formal organization of the University of Miami janitorial workers by Service Employees International Union (SEIU) began in February 2005. SEIU had been a primary organizer of the "Justice for Janitors" campaign and sought further assistance from South Florida Interfaith Worker Justice (SFIWJ), which initiated a partnership between the movement and religious organizations. During Fall 2005, a University of Miami student organization, Students Toward a New Democracy (STAND), attempted to "create an activist culture in an historically apathetic student body." In order to improve STAND's capabilities, SEIU brought in students from Harvard University, who previously conducted a successful three-week living wage campaign, and students from Georgetown University to help teach organizational tactics to University of Miami students affiliated with STAND.

=== Strike and protests ===
Following a majority of University of Miami custodial workers approving an unfair labor practice strike against UNICCO on February 26, 2006, the janitors officially went on strike. In order to show solidarity with the striking workers, over one hundred University of Miami professors and faculty held classes off campus in venues such as churches, houses, and even a park so as to not interfere with the campaign's picketing. Out of the 200 University of Miami janitors, SEIU reported that approximately half participated in the strike from the beginning. UNICCO, however, disputed this claim, asserting that SEIU was exaggerating the numbers and that 148 out of the 206 workers had reported for work the previous day. At the same time, SEIU announced that a ten-day strike notice had been issued to the University of Miami School of Medicine with the potential of adding 200 janitors to strike.

On March 28, 2006, members of the campaign launched a two-pronged action in an attempt to garner media attention. First, a group of 17 people, including union members, students, clergy, and community members, formed a human chain across U.S. Route 1 across from the University of Miami campus, blocking traffic on the heavily-trafficked highway. As police were arresting the 17 protesters, another group of 17 students and a campus chaplain occupied the Ashe Administration Building, which houses the University of Miami admissions and administrative offices. After a thirteen-hour occupation of the Ashe Administration Building, University of Miami president Donna Shalala agreed to meet with students and workers and SEIU representatives behind the strike.

=== Fasting in Freedom Village ===
Beginning April 5, the campaign introduced hunger strikes and fasting, which took place in "Freedom Village," the name given to the campaign's base of operations. The hunger strikes began with the workers, some of whom had previously participated in hunger strikes in their previous homeland of Cuba. Eight workers and seven students joined in the hunger strike. SEIU, which originally opposed this form of protest because of the health implications involved for those participating, ultimately came to support it and provided nurses at Freedom Village to monitor the safety of those fasting. After more than two weeks, some people taking part in the fasting strike were hospitalized. Leaders of the hunger strike recruited others to do the fasting, including SEIU president Andy Stern and executive vice president Eliseo Medina).

The University of Miami custodial strike attracted national attention, including visits by several out-of-town political and labor leaders in support of it, including Southern Christian Leadership Conference president John Edwards, Teamsters president James P. Hoffa, and civil rights leader Charles Steele, Jr.

== Resolution ==
On May 1, 2006, it was announced that UNICCO and the SEIU had reached an agreement that an independent third party, the American Arbitration Association, would determine whether or not a super-majority of UNICCO custodians at the University of Miami wished to unionize. UNICCO finally agreed to use of a card check vote as opposed to a secret ballot system they had originally sought. The agreement established a code of conduct governing how both the employer and the union would interact with the workers during the process. Both sides agreed not to interfere with the workers' decision on whether or not to unionize.

=== Agreement ===
SEIU secured a super-majority approval (more than 60%) to unionize from the votes of 425 UNICCO workers at the University of Miami and University of Miami's Jackson Memorial Hospital to unionize. University of Miami janitors returned to work on May 3, 2006, signifying the end of their nine-week-long strike. Following the vote, University of Miami janitor Maritza Perez, who had worked for UNICCO for eleven years, said, "I'm going to return [to work] with my head held high, protected by the name of the union, which is rare in the state of Florida."

=== University responses ===
On January 17, 2006, as the SEIU began ramped up efforts at the University of Miami, university president Donna Shalala issued a statement addressing the university's non-authorized solicitation regulations. Her letter emphasized the university's commitment to remain neutral regarding any labor issues between UNICCO and the SEIU.

But when the movement began gaining momentum in late March 2006, the University of Miami announced a new policy with higher standards for companies contracted by the university. This resulted in setting a minimum wage of $8.00 per hour, the recognition of performance and length of service in pay scales, and the offering of affordable health insurance to university employees. In an April 12, 2006 press release following the storming of the administration building by protestors, Shalala condemned the actions of the protestors, and stated: "it was the student organization STAND that delivered the message that [the outside protestors] were not welcome on campus today."

=== Responses by University governmental bodies ===
The strike was the subject of several motions by university governmental bodies, including one passed on March 28, 2006 by the University of Miami Faculty Senate, which urged the university to stipulate that its contractors provide a living wage, health insurance, and a fair workplace. The resolution further stated that should UNICCO's contract not be renewed by the university that the successful bidder be required to hire those University of Miami workers currently employed by UNICCO.

A second resolution, passed by the University of Miami student government on April 19, 2006, was a statement strongly disapproving of recent campus disruptions by several of the pro-strike organizations, and calling on these organizations to end the disruptions immediately. The actions by these groups mentioned in the resolution included harassing University of Miami students, the disrupting a class taught by Shalala, trespassing on private property, and "vandalizing the back entrance of the Ashe Building with graffiti".

== Results ==
In addition to SEIU being elected as the union for University of Miami custodial workers, the original policy changes implemented by the university in late March 2006 were maintained and included some additional improvements.

Increased wages
Position	Previous Salary	New Salary
Housekeeper	$6.40	$8.55
Groundskeeper	$6.40	$9.30
Food service	$6.40	$8.00

Pay scale
Contract Year	Pay Increase
Year 1	+$0.25
Year 2	+$0.40
Year 3 & 4	+$0.50

Health Care
Provided By	Amount/Month
Employer	$250
Worker	$13

== Disciplinary charges ==
Approximately 20 University of Miami students allegedly involved in pro-union activities received official notices to appear before a University of Miami dean on charges that they were being investigated for "major violations". SEIU representatives asked for amnesty for the students as part of the negotiated settlement on May 1, but were told the request was not negotiable.
