= Leo J. O'Donovan =

American Jesuit academic administrator and theologian

The Reverend Leo J. O'Donovan SJ
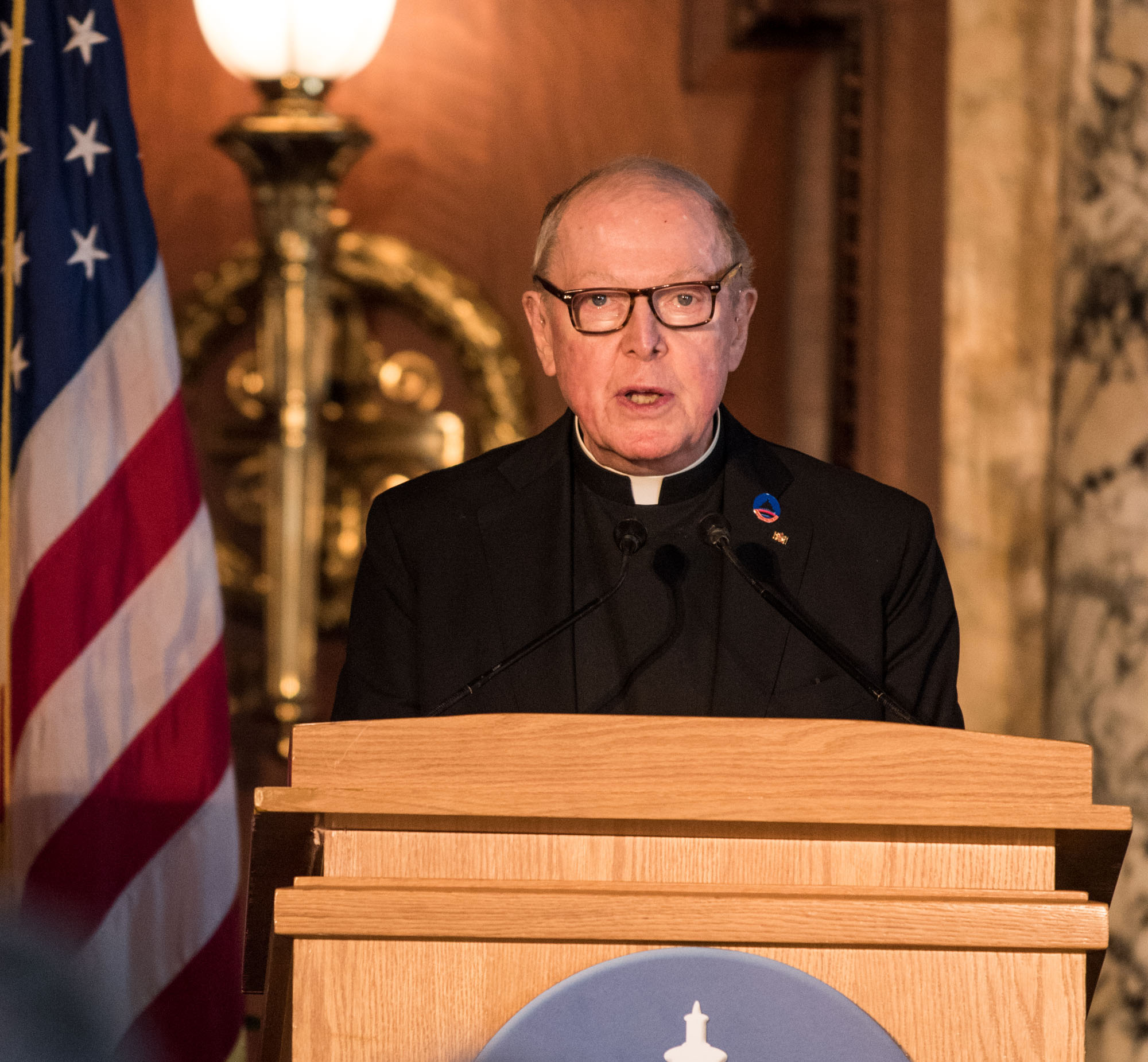
- O'Donovan speaking at the Dutch Embassy in Washington, D.C., in 2017

47th President of Georgetown University
- In office 1989–2001
- Preceded by: Timothy S. Healy
- Succeeded by: John J. DeGioia

Personal details
- Born: 1934 (age 91–92) New York City, United States
- Education: Georgetown University (BA); Fordham University (PhL); Woodstock College (STB, STL); University of Münster (ThD)
- Awards: Order of Merit of the Federal Republic of Germany (Knight Commander's Cross)

Orders
- Ordination: 1966

Leo Jeremiah O'Donovan III SJ (born 1934) is an American Jesuit priest and theologian who served as president of Georgetown University from 1989 to 2001.

Born in New York City, he graduated from Georgetown, and while studying in France, decided to enter the Society of Jesus. He went on to receive advanced degrees from Fordham University and Woodstock College, and received his doctorate in theology from the University of Münster, where he studied under Karl Rahner. Upon returning to the United States, he became a professor at Woodstock and the Weston Jesuit School of Theology before becoming the president of the Catholic Theological Society of America and a senior administrator in the Jesuits' Maryland Province.

In 1989, O'Donovan was named the president of Georgetown University. His administration saw a significant improvement of the university's finances, which included tripling its endowment and selling the university hospital, which was in substantial debt. The number of applications for admission increased, and Georgetown became among the most selective universities in the country. At the same time, the faculty, administration, and student body became increasingly diverse. His tenure was not without controversy, as he was ordered by a Vatican ecclesiastical court to withdraw funding for a student abortion rights group. He also served as a director of The Walt Disney Company from 1996 to 2007.

Following the end of his presidency in 2001, O'Donovan returned to teaching, continuing to do so until 2013. He has remained active in national higher education organizations, and in 2016, became the director of mission for the Jesuit Refugee Service USA. A longtime friend of President Joe Biden, O'Donovan delivered the invocation at Biden's 2021 presidential inauguration.

== Early life and education ==
Leo Jeremiah O'Donovan III was born in 1934 to Margaret and Leo J. O'Donovan Jr. in the Far Rockaway neighborhood of Queens, in New York City, New York. Growing up on the Upper West Side of Manhattan, his family belonged to Corpus Christi Church in Morningside Heights and O'Donovan attended the Corpus Christi School, where he was educated by the Sinsinawa Dominican Sisters. For high school, he attended Iona Preparatory School in New Rochelle, New York, graduating in 1952.

O'Donovan then enrolled at Georgetown University with the intention of becoming a psychiatrist. However, halfway through his undergraduate studies, he quit the pre-medical program, and double-majored in English and philosophy. While at Georgetown, he wrote for the student newspaper, The Hoya, and was editor-in-chief of the Georgetown College Journal. He graduated summa cum laude and first in his class in 1956. O'Donovan received a Fulbright Scholarship to study at the University of Lyon in France, where he decided to enter the Society of Jesus in 1957. He also received a Danforth Fellowship.

Upon his return to the United States, he studied at Fordham University, where he received a Licentiate of Philosophy. He then studied at Woodstock College in Maryland, earning a Bachelor of Sacred Theology and Licentiate of Sacred Theology. He was ordained a priest there in 1966. Following his ordination, he went to the University of Münster in West Germany, where he studied under the Jesuit theologian Karl Rahner and received his Doctor of Theology degree in 1971. He then spent time at the University of Chicago Divinity School as a post-doctoral scholar.

== Academic career ==
In 1971, O'Donovan became an assistant professor of theology at Woodstock College, then located in New York City. After three years, he left to become a professor of theology at the Weston Jesuit School of Theology in Cambridge, Massachusetts, specializing in systematic theology. While there, he professed his final vows in 1977. From 1981 to 1982, O'Donovan served as the president of the Catholic Theological Society of America. He took a leave of absence from Weston from 1985 to 1988, during which time he was the provincial assistant for formation for the Jesuit Maryland Province. He then returned to Weston as professor for an additional year.

== Georgetown University ==
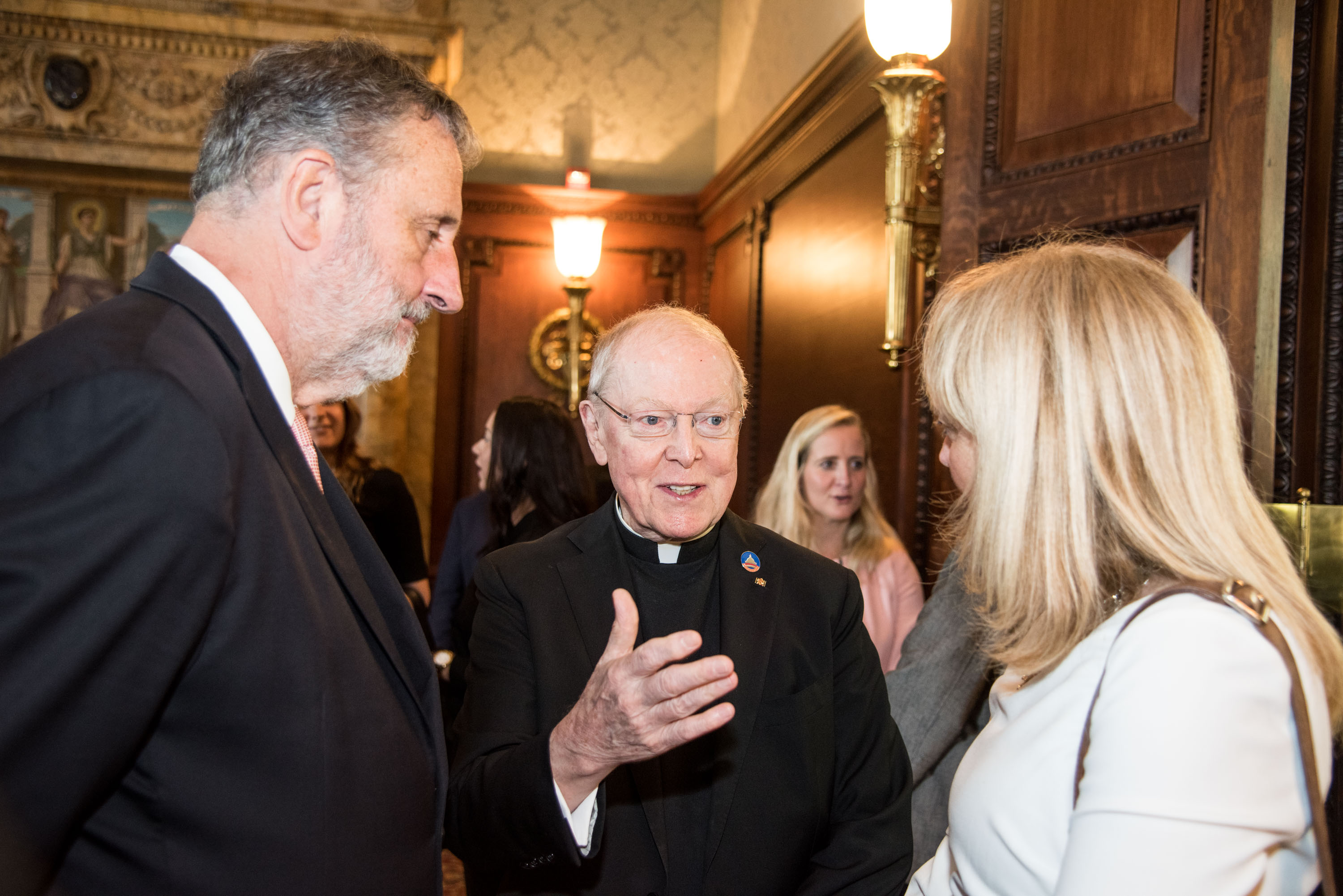
O'Donovan with Dutch Ambassador Hendrik Jan Jurriaan Schuwer and Katrina Swett

O'Donovan was appointed the president of Georgetown University, and assumed office on September 23, 1989. Succeeding Timothy S. Healy, he was the first alumnus of Georgetown to be named president since Alphonsus J. Donlon, whose presidency began in 1912. Several academic components were reorganized during O'Donovan's tenure. In 1994, under the provost's direction, the School of Languages and Linguistics was subsumed into Georgetown College, with the exception of its linguistics faculty, which became part of the Graduate School of Arts and Sciences. The departments of economics, history, and government were also relocated from the School of Foreign Service to Georgetown College.

O'Donovan devised a new master plan for the university's physical campus, which had undergone rapid and often haphazard growth during the previous two decades. The plan called for all new buildings to be architecturally cohesive with that of the historic portion of campus and the surrounding Georgetown neighborhood. While no new buildings were constructed during his presidency, planning for the construction of the Southwest Quadrangle, which included a large dormitory, dining hall, parking garage, and new Jesuit residence, began. Instead, funds were allocated to the refurbishment of existing buildings that had deteriorated from neglect of maintenance during the same 20 years. As under his predecessor, the size of the faculty continued to increase, contrary to a national trend of shrinking faculty sizes. At the same time, the percentage of faculty who were women or racial minorities increased, and women came to hold many of the university's most senior administrative positions.

=== Academic growth ===
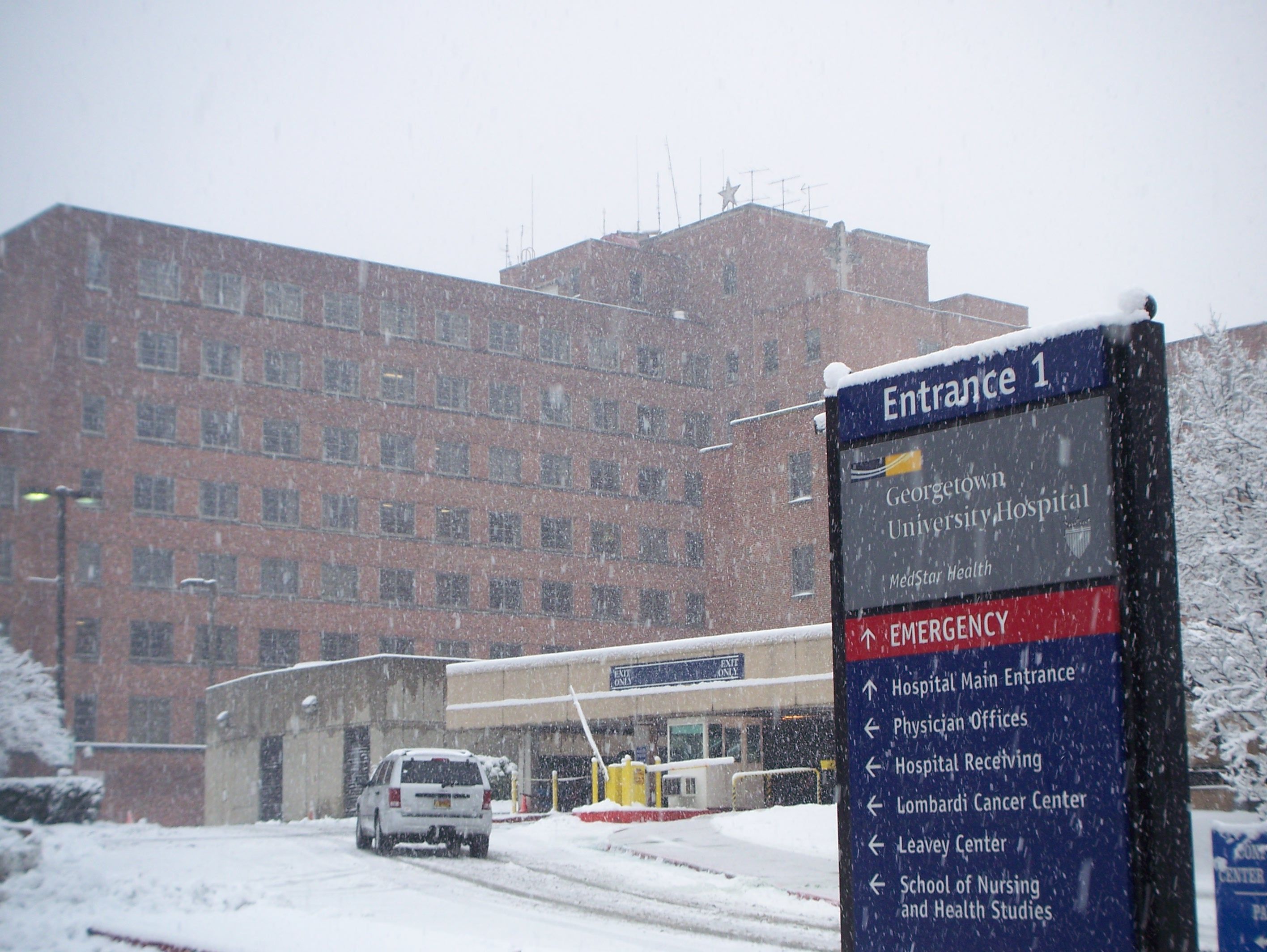
To shed its growing debt, O'Donovan sold the Georgetown University Hospital to MedStar Health in 2000.

The caliber of students admitted to Georgetown continued to increase during this time. The number of applications grew steadily, and the university's admissions rate declined from 29% in 1991 to 21% in 2001, joining the ranks of the most highly selective universities in the country. At the same time, the classes of entering students grew increasingly geographically and ethnically diverse. Having undergone unprecedented growth during the latter half of the 20th century, the university convened an exploration of its identity, particularly in regard to its Catholic and Jesuit nature. After several years, the task force resolved in 2000 that its Catholic and Jesuit heritage was core to the university's identity.

Funding for research more than doubled as the university saw increased grant awards, primarily to the medical center. In addition, numerous centers and institutes were created during O'Donovan's presidency, including the Georgetown Public Policy Institute in 1990, which would become the McCourt School of Public Policy in 2013, following a gift of $100 million from Frank McCourt, equivalent to $138 million in 2025. Another such institute was the Center for Muslim-Christian Understanding, which was founded in 1993, and renamed in 2006 for Prince Alwaleed bin Talal, in recognition of a $20 million gift from the Saudi royal, equivalent to $32 million in 2025. O'Donovan also significantly improved the university's financial situation, with the endowment tripling from $240 million to $740 million over the course of his tenure, equivalent to $623 million and $1.35 billion, respectively, in 2025. After several years of increasing deficits, O'Donovan decided to sell a controlling interest in the Georgetown University Hospital to MedStar Health in 2000. Under the agreement, MedStar assumed the hospital's $80 million in debt, in exchange for assuming control of the hospital's operations and its 4,000 employees. Georgetown retained ownership of medical and nursing schools, as well as their research programs.

=== Campus cultural conflicts ===
One controversy that arose during O'Donovan's presidency concerned the funding and official recognition of an abortion rights student group. In 1991, the university had decided to fund the group, on the grounds that it would be an informational rather than advocacy organization. This prompted strong condemnation from the Archbishop of Washington, Cardinal James Hickey, and a group of alumni, who brought a canon lawsuit against the university. In April 1992, the suit was heard at the Vatican, which ruled that the university must immediately end funding of the group. The university revoked the group's funding, and while it denied that its decision was due to the court order, a high-ranking Jesuit was soon sent to campus to ensure that O'Donovan complied with the ruling. O'Donovan also drew criticism for his decisions to allow speakers such as Larry Flynt on campus, and to permit the university to perform fetal tissue research.

In 1996, O'Donovan was appointed to the board of directors of The Walt Disney Company. The selection of a priest to be a director of a major American corporation was highly unusual. His appointment came at a time when Disney was facing criticism from religious organizations, such as the Southern Baptist Convention—for hosting gay and lesbian theme nights—and the Catholic League—for distributing a movie that sympathetically portrayed a homosexual Catholic priest. While some speculated that his appointment was a public relations move by Disney to allay the concerns of religious groups, both O'Donovan and Michael Eisner, the CEO of Disney, denied that this was the reason for his appointment. Eisner, who also served on Georgetown's board of directors and whose son was a student at Georgetown at the time, stated that he had intended to appoint O'Donovan to the board before the start of any controversy, and made the appointment once a seat opened up. He remained on the board until 2007.

O'Donovan's tenure as president came to an end in 2001, and he was succeeded by John J. DeGioia. Upon stepping down, he received the university's highest award, the John Carroll Award.

== Later career ==
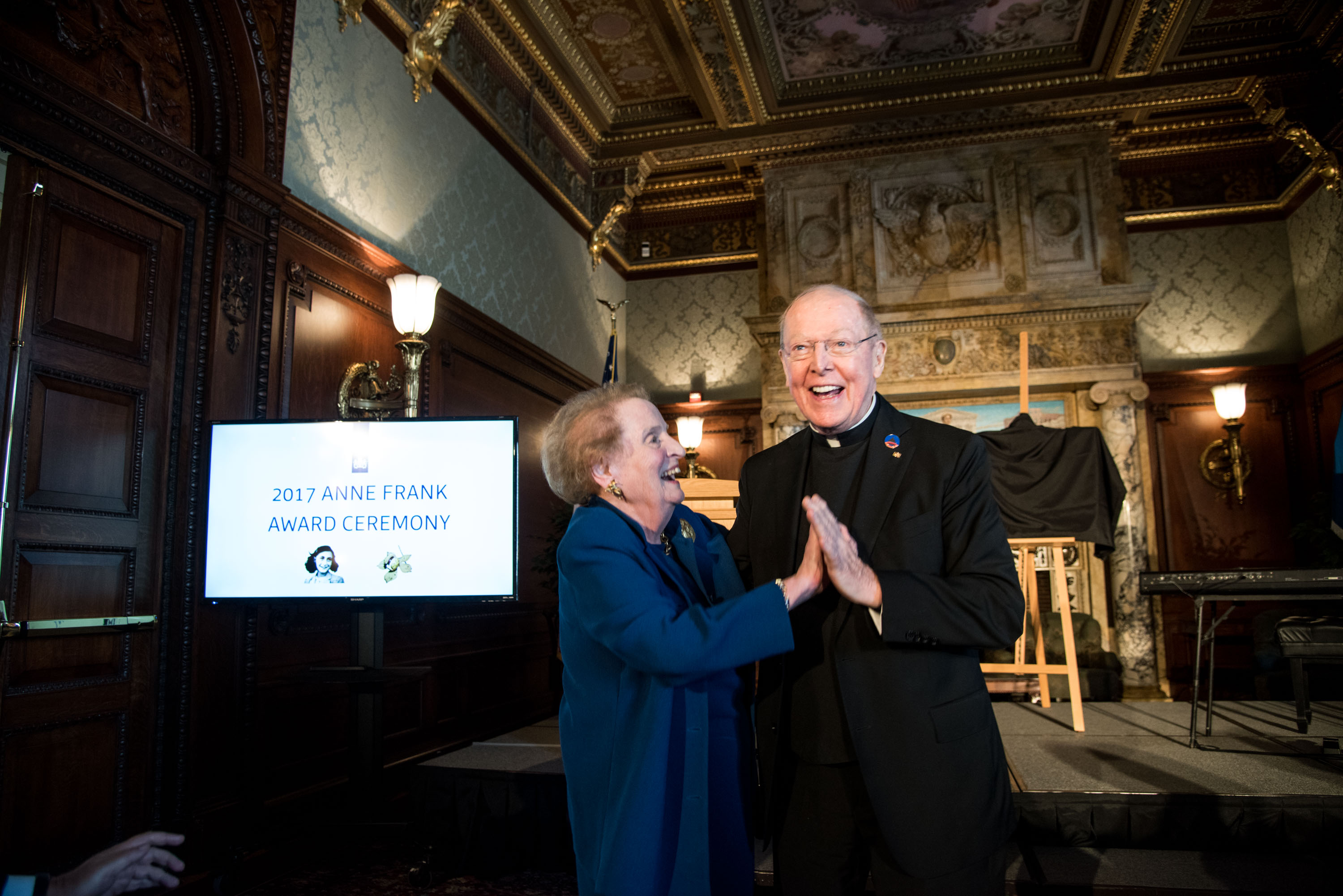
O'Donovan with former U.S. Secretary of State Madeleine Albright in 2017

After leaving Georgetown, O'Donovan returned to teaching and scholarship. In 2003, Georgetown University's new dining hall was named the Leo J. O'Donovan Dining Hall. He became a visiting professor at Fordham University and the General Theological Seminary, teaching until 2013. In 2006, he was a BMW Distinguished Visitor at the American Academy in Berlin. From 2008 to 2009, he was also a visiting professor at the Union Theological Seminary. In 2009, he became the co-chair of the St. Claude La Colombière Jesuit Community campaign. He then returned to Georgetown University as a professor of theology.

In 2016, O'Donovan became the director of mission for the Jesuit Refugee Service USA. In this capacity, he wrote about his opposition to President Donald Trump's immigration policies, particularly with regard to Muslim immigrants.

== Personal life ==
O'Donovan is a longtime friend of President Joe Biden. He presided over the funeral Mass for Biden's son, Beau Biden, at St. Anthony of Padua Church in Wilmington, Delaware, in 2015. He also delivered the invocation at Joe Biden's 2021 presidential inauguration. O'Donovan was also a friend of German Chancellor Helmut Kohl.

=== Memberships and affiliations ===
O'Donovan has been a member of numerous organizations and committees. He served on the Special Commission on the Religious Life of Undergraduates at Yale University, which was convened by Yale president Rick Levin, as well as on the Blue Ribbon Committee on the Future of the Public Library of Washington, D.C., which was convened by Mayor Anthony Williams. O'Donovan has also served on the boards of the College of New Rochelle, Fidelis Health Care New York, Jesuit Volunteers International, and was chairman of the Corpus Christi School. He has also been a member of the Association of Catholic Colleges and Universities, a member of the steering committee of presidents for the America Reads Initiative, the chair of the Consortium on Financing Higher Education, and was a member of the National Council on the Arts of the National Endowment for the Arts. For a period of time, he was also the chaplain to the New York Athletic Club.

O'Donovan has received the Knight Commanders Cross with star of the Order of Merit of the Federal Republic of Germany and the Jewish National Fund Tree of Life Award. He has also received four honorary degrees. In 2014, the Leo J. O'Donovan Fund for Jesuit Education, which seeks to support the formation of young Jesuits, was established.

Academic offices
Preceded by Timothy S. Healy	47th President of Georgetown University; 1989–2001	Succeeded by John J. DeGioia
Professional and academic associations
Preceded by Thomas F. O'Meara	36th President of the Catholic Theological Society of America; 1981–1982	Succeeded by Bernard J. Cooke
