= Karen Barkey =

Turkish American sociologist

- Born: 1958 (age 67–68); Istanbul, Turkey
- Education: Bryn Mawr College (B.A.); University of Washington (M.A.); University of Chicago (Ph.D.)
- Occupations: Sociologist; Professor

Karen Barkey is an American sociologist and professor who currently serves as the Bertie K. Hawver Kellogg Chair of Sociology and Religion Bard College. Previously, she has served as the Chair of Religious Diversity at the Othering & Belonging Institute at University of California, Berkeley, and as director for the Institute for Religion, Culture, and Public Life at Columbia University.

Her work mostly focuses on comparative and historical studies of states, largely focusing on the Ottoman Empire. She has also studied religious tolerance policies within states and their effects.

== Early life ==
Karen Barkey was raised in Istanbul by a Sephardic Jewish family. She graduated from the Lycée Notre Dame de Sion in Istanbul and moved to the United States for her college education. She received her B.A. from Bryn Mawr College, her M.A. from the University of Washington, and her Ph.D. from the University of Chicago.

== Career ==
In September 1989, Barkey started as an assistant professor of sociology at Columbia University. Prior, she taught at the University of Wisconsin–Madison. In 1994, she released her first book, Bandits and Bureaucrats: The Ottoman Route to State Centralization, which examines the strategies that the Ottoman Empire used to exert control and how it managed the various forces within its government. Bandits and Bureaucrats won the Social Science History Association's Allan Sharlin Memorial Book Award for the best book about social science history in the year 1995. She became a tenured professor in 1998. In 2008, she released Empire of Difference: The Ottomans in Comparative Perspective, a comparative study of the organization of the Ottoman Empire to similarly sized empires of the time. The following year, Empire of Difference won the American Sociological Association's Barrington Moore Award for the best book in comparative and historical sociology, as well as the American Political Science Association's J. David Greenstone Book Prize for the best book in politics and history.

In fall 2016, Barkey moved to University of California, Berkeley, where she served as the distinguished chair of the Haas Institute's research cluster on Religious Diversity and as a faculty member in the Department of Sociology.

In fall 2021, Barkey was appointed the Charles Theodore Kellogg and Bertie K. Hawver Kellogg Chair of Sociology and Religion at Bard College in Annandale-on-Hudson, New York. She will hold this position until 2026. During her tenure, Barkey was named the 2021–2022 Germaine Tillion Chair of Mediterranean studies of the Institute for Advanced Study of Aix-Marseille University.

=== Shared Sacred Sites ===
Shared Sacred Sites is a collaborative project that seeks to develop a rubric for the description, classification, analysis, and publication of work relating to spaces and locations used by multiple, disparate communities for religious purposes.

Part of the project is a traveling international Shared Sacred Sites Exhibition, which was hosted at the Museum of European and Mediterranean Civilisations in Marseilles, France (2015), the Bardo National Museum in Tunis, Tunisia (2016), Macedonian Museum of Contemporary Art, Thessaloniki Museum of Photography, and Yeni Cami (also known as New Mosque (Thessaloniki) in Thessaloniki, Greece. An exhibition catalogue, Shared Sacred Sites in the Balkans and in the Mediterranean, co-edited with Dionigi Albera, Dimitris Papadopoulos and Manoël Pénicaud, was published by the Macedonian Museum of Contemporary Art Publications in 2018.

In March 2018, the exhibition opened at the New York Public Library, Graduate Center, CUNY, and Morgan Library & Museum in New York. An exhibition catalogue, Shared Sacred Sites: A Contemporary Pilgrimage, co-edited with Dionigi Albera and Manöel Pénicaud, was published by CUNY Publications in 2018.

== Scientific contributions ==
Barkey studies state centralization/decentralization, state control and social movements against states in the context of empires. Her research focuses primarily on the Ottoman Empire and recently on comparisons between Ottoman, Habsburg and Roman empires.

She is engaged in different projects on religion and toleration. She has written on the early centuries of Ottoman state toleration and is now exploring different ways of understanding how religious coexistence, toleration and sharing occurred in different historical sites under Ottoman rule. She directs a web-based project on shared sacred sites.

== Personal life ==
Barkey has two children: Josh and Anna-Claire.

== Selected bibliography ==
- Barkey, Karen, and Jonathan Laurence, eds. 2026. Handbook on Religious Toleration. Springer Publications.
- Karen Barkey, Sudipta Kaviraj, and Vatsal Naresh, eds. 2021. Negotiating Democracy and Religious Pluralism: India, Pakistan and Turkey. Oxford University Press.
- Dionigi Albera, Karen Barkey, and Manoël Pénicaud, eds. 2018. Shared Sacred Sites: A Contemporary Pilgrimage. CUNY Publications.
- Dionigi Albera, Karen Barkey, Dimitris Papadopoulos and Manoël Pénicaud, eds. 2018. Sharing Shared Sacred Sites in the Balkans and in the Mediterranean. Macedonian Museum of Contemporary Art Publications.
- Barkey, Karen, and George Gavrilis. 2015. "The Ottoman Millet System: Non-Territorial Autonomy and its Legacy Today". Ethnopolitics.
- Barkey, Karen, and Elazar Barkan. 2014. Choreographies of Shared Sacred Sites: Religion, Politics, & Conflict Resolution. New York, NY: Columbia University Press.
- Barkey, Karen, and Frédéric Godart. 2013. "Empires, Federated Arrangements and Kingdoms: Using Political Models of Governance to Understand Firms' Creative Performance". Organization Studies 34:79–104.
- Barkey, Karen. 2008. Empire of Difference: The Ottomans in Comparative Perspective. Cambridge, UK: Cambridge University Press.
- Barkey, Karen, and Ronan Van Rossem. 1997. "Networks of Contention: Villages and Regional Structure in the Seventeenth-Century Ottoman Empire". American Journal of Sociology 102:1345–82.
- Barkey, Karen, and Mark von Hagen. 1997. After empire: multiethnic societies and nation-building: the Soviet Union and the Russian, Ottoman and Habsburg empires. Boulder, CO: Westview Press.
- Barkey, Karen. 1996. "In Different Times: Scheduling and Social Control in the Ottoman Empire, 1550 to 1650". Comparative Studies in Society and History 38:460–483.
- Barkey, Karen. 1994. Bandits and Bureaucrats: The Ottoman Route to State Centralization. Ithaca, NY: Cornell University Press

== Selected talks ==
- “Empires of Diversity: Unveils the Ottoman Legacy.” Afikra, 2023.
- “Making Sense of Hagia Sophia’s Conversion.” ResetDOC, July 2020.
- “The Road Ahead for US Democracy.” ResetDOC, June 22 2020.
- Interviews for Netflix Series, Rise of Empires: Ottoman. January 2020.
- “Le Partage des Lieux Saints.” Le Huffington Post, November 11 2015.
- “Esquisse Pour Une Discussion sur La Tolérance.” Le Huffington Post. 2014.
- “Ottomans: le règne de la différence.” Sciences Humaines, December 2013.
- “Threaten, Cajole, but Don’t Execute - Turkey: The Country Needs Only to Look to ItsOwn History to Learn How to Deal with Rebellion.” Los Angeles Times, July 2 1999.
