= Paul LeClerc =

American scholar

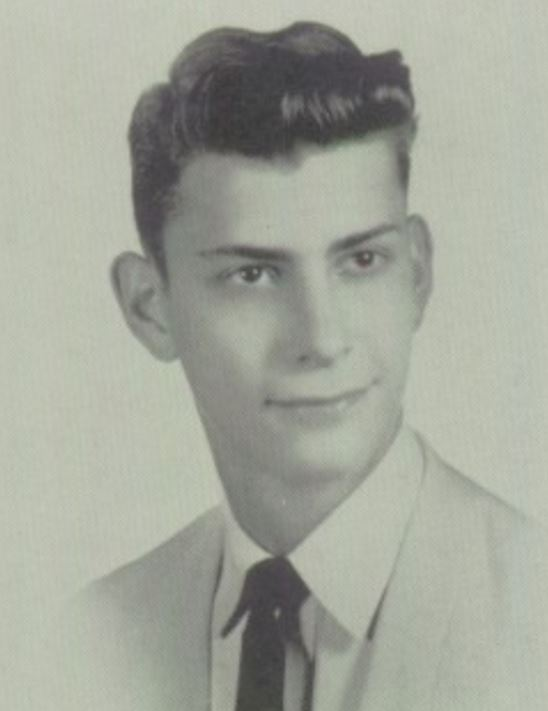
LeClerc in his senior yearbook photo in 1959

Paul LeClerc is an American scholar of French literature, former president of Hunter College, and former president and CEO of the New York Public Library. LeClerc is also a trustee of the Andrew W. Mellon Foundation as director of the National Book Foundation, as director of the Maison Française of Columbia University.

== Early life and education ==
LeClerc was born on May 28, 1941, in Lebanon, New Hampshire, the grandson of French Canadian immigrants. French was spoken in his childhood home, and he was raised in Queens, New York, where he attended parochial schools. He attended Holy Cross High School in Flushing, graduating in 1959.

After high school, LeClerc graduated from the College of the Holy Cross in Worcester, Massachusetts, with a Bachelor of Science in biology in 1963. As an undergraduate at Holy Cross, he was active in several campus organizations, including the biology society and yearbook committee. He also developed an interest in eighteenth-century French literature and Voltaire. He spent the following academic year after graduation at the University of Paris, studying at the Sorbonne. He then earned a Master of Arts in French literature in 1965 and his Ph.D. in French literature with distinction in 1969 from Columbia University. As a doctoral student, he studied under historian Peter Gay.

== Career ==
While still completing his doctorate, LeClerc became a faculty member of Union College in Schenectady, New York, in 1966.

In 1988, LeClerc became the president of Hunter College in New York City, New York.

LeClerc served as president of the New York Public Library from December 1, 1993 until July 1, 2011.

LeClerc was elected to the American Philosophical Society in 2006.

In 2012, LeClerc became the director of Columbia Global Centers (Paris) for Columbia University. LeClerc is the chairman of Maison Française Advisory Board.

== Personal life ==
LeClerc's wife is Judith Ginsberg.

== See also ==
- Voltaire
