= David R. Williams =

David R. Williams may refer to:

- David R. Williams (scientist) (born 1954), Saint Lucian-American public health scientist at Harvard
- David Robert Williams (1954–2026), American aerospace and mechanical engineer
- David Rogerson Williams (1776–1830), governor of South Carolina from 1814 to 1816
- Dafydd Williams (born 1954), also known as Dafydd "Dave" Rhys Williams, Canadian astronaut
