= Kerr Bill =

The Kerr Bill was an attempt to deregulate natural gas prices in the United States by amending the Natural Gas Act of 1938 to specifically remove any right of the Federal Power Commission to regulate the price charged for natural gas going into interstate pipelines. It was strongly backed by oil and gas companies. It was opposed by Leland Olds the chairman of the Federal Power Commission, although the Federal Power Commission itself did not take a position on the Bill and it was seen as a big factor in the rejection of Olds when his re-nomination was rejected later that year.

In 1948 and 1949 Bills with this aim has passed the House with large majorities, and were defeated by divided votes in the Senate Committee on Interstate and Foreign Commerce. In 1950 it passed both houses of Congress but was vetoed by President Truman.
