= James L. Olds =

American neuroscientist (born 1956)

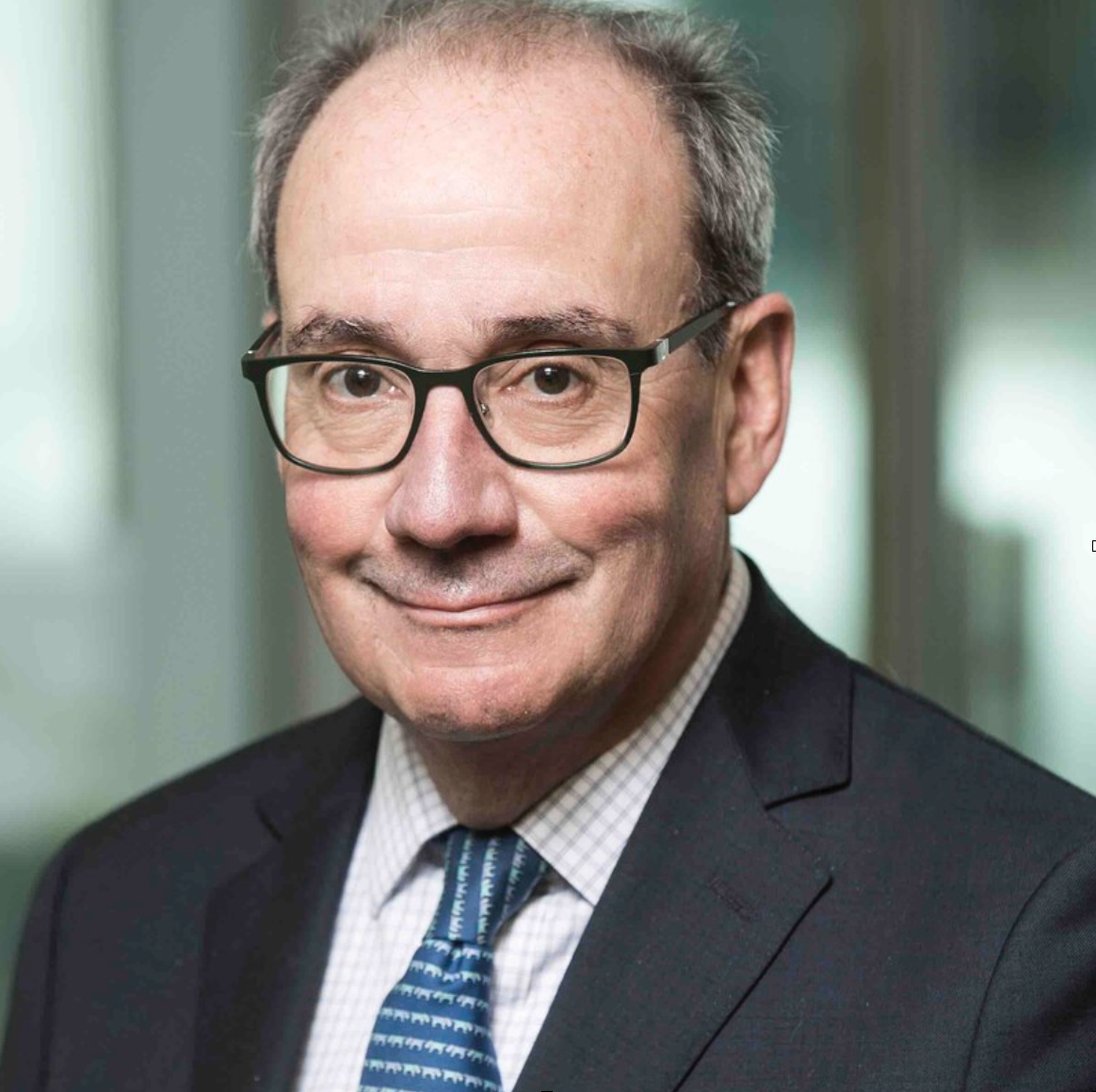
- Born: July 24, 1956 (age 70); Los Angeles, California, U.S.
- Citizenship: American
- Education: Amherst College (BA); University of Michigan (PhD)
- Known for: Role of protein kinase C in learning, science policy, cognitive neuroscience
- Parent(s): James Olds (father); Marianne E. Olds (mother)
- Relatives: Robin E. Buckley (wife); Jacqueline Olds (sister); Leland Olds (grandfather); George D. Olds (great-grandfather)
- Scientific career
- Fields: Neuroscience, public policy, artificial intelligence
- Workplaces: George Mason University, National Science Foundation, National Institutes of Health
- Doctoral advisor: Bernard W. Agranoff

James L. Olds (born July 24, 1956) is an American neuroscientist, science policy official, academic administrator, and public intellectual whose career has spanned scientific research, university leadership, and national science governance. He is a Distinguished University Professor at the Schar School of Policy and Government, George Mason University, with appointments bridging neuroscience and public policy. From 2014 to 2017, he served as Assistant Director for the Directorate for Biological Sciences (BIO) at the National Science Foundation (NSF), overseeing the agency's biological sciences research portfolio.

Olds is recognized for his work at the intersection of neuroscience, artificial intelligence, innovation policy, science communication, and higher education leadership.

== Early life and family background ==
Olds was born in Los Angeles, California, and was raised in both Ann Arbor, Michigan, and Pasadena, California. He is the son of James Olds, whose pioneering work on brain reward systems helped shape modern neuroscience, and the grandson of Leland Olds, an economist who served as chairman of the Federal Power Commission during the 1940s. He is also a great-grandson of George D. Olds, who served as president of Amherst College.

== Education ==
Olds received a B.A. in Chemistry from Amherst College in 1978. He earned a Ph.D. in Neurosciences from the University of Michigan in 1987 under the supervision of a notable neurochemist, Bernard W. Agranoff. His doctoral research developed new methods for repeated within-subject imaging of cerebral metabolism, contributing to the biological understanding of learning and behavior.

Following his doctorate, he completed postdoctoral fellowships from 1987 to 1991 and 1991 to 1995 at the National Institutes of Health (NIH), where he pursued advanced research in brain science. These experiences provided a foundation for his later work spanning neuroscience research, scientific leadership, and science policy.

== Scientific research and scholarship ==
Olds has published more than 80 scholarly articles and holds two United States patents. His scholarly output includes 58 peer-reviewed natural science publications and 27 peer-reviewed public policy publications. His research outputs and institutional papers are archived across academic repositories including George Mason University's open research network.

His early scientific research focused on the molecular and cellular basis of learning and memory, particularly protein kinase C signaling, synaptic plasticity, and hippocampal function. He co-authored several key studies on hippocampal memory processes, spatial navigation, place learning, and the neural mechanisms underlying learning and behavior published in major journals such as Science, Neurobiology of Learning and Memory, and Behavioural Brain Research.

Later in his career, Olds expanded his focus into computational neuroscience, biomimetic artificial intelligence, neurorobotics, and explainable AI. He has also published on science policy, research governance, neuroethics, and innovation systems. His interdisciplinary scholarship emphasizes the links between brain science, emerging technologies, and public institutions. He has served as principal investigator or senior personnel on externally funded projects supported by the National Science Foundation and the United States Air Force, including multi-million-dollar AI and network systems initiatives.

== Academic leadership ==
From 1995 to 1998, Olds served as Executive Director of the American Association of Anatomists, managing operations and helping coordinate major scientific meetings in collaboration with the Federation of American Societies for Experimental Biology (FASEB).

Olds later joined George Mason University, serving as Director and Chief Academic Unit Officer of the Krasnow Institute for Advanced Study from 1998 to 2014. At Krasnow, he initiated the Decade of the Mind project, an international effort aimed at advancing scientific understanding of how the mind and complex human behaviors relate to brain activity. The Decade of the Mind Manifesto, published after a conference of leading scientists met at George Mason University in May 2007, called for major long-term investment in inderdisciplinary mind research.

He also served as the founding chair of the university's Department of Molecular Neuroscience from 2007 to 2014. Since 2018, he has served as a Distinguished University Professor with joint appointments in neuroscience and public policy at George Mason University.

== National Science Foundation and federal service ==
From 2014 to 2017, Olds served as Assistant Director at the National Science Foundation. In this role, he led the Directorate for Biological Sciences (BIO), directing a budget of approximately $750 million to oversee federal support for biological research across universities and research institutions throughout the United States.

During his federal tenure, he led NSF's participation in the White House BRAIN Initiative, co-led the Foundation’s work for Vice President Joe Biden’s Cancer Moonshot initiative, and co-chaired the National Science and Technology Council (NSTC) Subcommittee on Life Sciences. He also helped stabilize the National Ecological Observatory Network (NEON), a $500 million national research infrastructure project in which digital data repositories map ecological efforts across the United States. His federal service involved direct engagement with senior executive branch leadership and presidential science priorities.

== Public intellectual and science communication ==
Olds has repeatedly emphasized the civic role of scientists in democratic society. He is the author of the book How to Be an Ambassador for Science (2025), which explores how researchers and scientists can better engage with broader publics, policymakers, and institutions beyond the laboratory setting. He has written and spoken on public trust in science, innovation systems, higher education, and the relationship between scientific expertise and democracy.

== Editorial and public service ==
Olds served as Editor-in-Chief of The Biological Bulletin from 2005 to 2016. He has also served on the editorial boards of Scientific Reports and Frontiers in Neurorobotics.

As part of his public service, he has testified before committees of the United States House of Representatives on science funding and neuroscience research, as well as on the progress and management of the National Ecological Observatory Network.
