= Phillips Petroleum Co. v. Wisconsin =

- Supreme Court of the United States

Argued April 6–7, 1954 Decided June 7, 1954
- Full case name: Phillips Petroleum Co. v. Wisconsin
- Citations: 347 U.S. 672 (more) 74 S.Ct. 794; 98 L. Ed. 2d 1035; 1954 U.S. LEXIS 2620

Case history
- Prior: 205 F.2d 706 (D.C. Cir. 1953); cert. granted, 346 U.S. 934 (1954).
- Subsequent: Rehearing denied, 348 U.S. 851 (1954).

Holding
- Wellhead sales of natural gas are subject to federal regulation

Court membership
- Chief Justice Earl Warren Associate Justices Hugo Black · Stanley F. Reed; Felix Frankfurter · William O. Douglas; Robert H. Jackson · Harold H. Burton; Tom C. Clark · Sherman Minton

Case opinions
- Majority: Minton, joined by Warren, Black, Reed, Jackson
- Concurrence: Frankfurter
- Dissent: Douglas
- Dissent: Clark, joined by Burton

Laws applied
- Natural Gas Act; 15 U.S.C. § 717

Phillips Petroleum Co. v. Wisconsin, 347 U.S. 672 (1954), was a case decided by the Supreme Court of the United States holding that sale of natural gas at the wellhead was subject to regulation under the Natural Gas Act. Prior to this case, independent producers sold natural gas to interstate pipelines at unregulated prices with any subsequent sales for resale being regulated. The State of Wisconsin sought to close this regulatory loophole in order to keep consumer prices low. Natural gas producers argued that wellhead sales were exempt from federal regulation as "production and gathering." Below, the Federal Power Commission compiled an evidentiary record 10,000 pages long before deciding not to regulate wellhead sales. However, the courts reversed, and the case resulted in federal price controls on wellhead gas prices for the next 40 years.

== Background ==
Natural gas is typically produced in association with oil from wells. Wells can also be drilled into geological formations that have mostly gas and very little oil. In the infancy of the oil industry, any natural gas produced from oil wells was burned off. Later, states passed conservation laws which required the gas to be captured and transported in pipelines for useful purposes. In order to prevent any gaps in the natural gas regulation when natural gas flows in interstate commerce, Congress enacted the Natural Gas Act of 1938. That law required that companies must obtain from the Federal Power Commission (FPC) a "certificate of public convenience and necessity" (certificate) before making any sale for resale natural gas in interstate commerce. The FPC set the maximum prices charged for gas sold under a certificate. For example, if gas flowed from a well in Texas through a pipeline to New York where it was sold to a gas distribution company, the sale by the pipeline to the distributor would need a certificate. The final sale to retail customers were exempt from the law. Although the Natural Gas Act regulated both the transportation and sale of gas in interstate commerce, the "production and gathering" of gas was exempt from federal regulation, (Note: Section 1(b) of the Natural Gas Act provides, "The provisions of this chapter shall apply to the transportation of natural gas in interstate commerce, to the sale in interstate commerce of natural gas for resale for ultimate public consumption for domestic, commercial, industrial, or any other use, and to natural-gas companies engaged in such transportation or sale, and to the importation or exportation of natural gas in foreign commerce and to persons engaged in such importation or exportation, but shall not apply to any other transportation or sale of natural gas or to the local distribution of natural gas or to the facilities used for such distribution or to the production or gathering of natural gas.") although potentially subject to state control. Production means bringing the gas out of the ground to a pipe at the top of the wellhead. Gathering refers to the flow of gas through low pressure lines to the center of a gas field where the gas is treated and compressed to bring it up to the high pressures used in long-distance pipelines.

Oil companies claimed that because production and gathering was exempt, any sales between the oil company that owned the well and the pipeline company were also exempt from Natural Gas Act regulation if they took place at the wellhead or along the gathering lines. The producers wanted to charge a wellhead price based on market forces, while consumer groups argued that the Natural Gas Act intended that both producers and pipelines should be limited to cost-based rate regulation, so that the final price paid by consumers would represent only the cost of producing, transporting and distributing the gas, instead of a price based on the cost of competing fuels, such as fuel oil.

From 1938 to 1954, the FPC did not regulate wellhead prices. However, these prices were very low because the amount of available gas supply exceeded the pipeline capacity to move it to national markets. However, after World War II, wellhead gas prices rose even to the point that producers started to drill new gas-only wells in areas that contained little oil. The State of Wisconsin claimed that the absence of federal wellhead price regulation caused the delivered price of gas in Wisconsin to reach unreasonable levels. Wisconsin wanted the FPC to regulate wellhead gas sales.

== Proceedings below ==
The FPC was a five-member regulatory body appointed by the President and confirmed by the Senate. From 1939 the Chairman was Leland Olds who was keen on regulation and insisted on enforcing the Natural Gas Act of 1938. After his failed renomination, the FPC was reluctant to impose price regulation on the producers.

Phillips Petroleum Company (now ConocoPhillips) was a very large operator in the petroleum industry and a very large producer, gatherer, and processor of natural gas from wells in Texas, Oklahoma, and New Mexico. Phillips owned and operated nine gathering systems and gas processing plants that sold gas to interstate pipelines at unregulated prices. The State of Wisconsin represented the interest of consumers who purchases gas from the pipelines that in turn purchased the gas from Phillips. (Note: Phillips sold gas to the Michigan-Wisconsin Pipe Line Co. that sold gas to gas distributors in Wisconsin.) Wisconsin wanted the FPC to regulate Phillips' sale prices. Wisconsin argued that the "production and gathering" exemption applied to the physical movement of gas and not to any sales of gas.

On October 28, 1948, while Olds was still chair, the FPC started an investigation into Phillips' jurisdictional status and whether its rates were unjust and unreasonable. The FPC heard testimony and read exhibits filling close to 10,000 pages of the case record. Gas producing states told the FPC that FPC regulation wellhead sales would interfere with state conservation rules and regulations. After Olds left the commission, the FPC held that although the sale by Phillips to the pipelines was a "sale for resale in interstate commerce," it was exempt under the "production and gathering" exception. Wisconsin appealed FPC's refusal to regulate to the United States Court of Appeals for the District of Columbia Circuit. (Note: Review of FPC actions are heard by the Court of Appeals without first going to a federal District Court. 15 U.S.C. § 717r.) Circuit Judges Edgerton, Clark, and Prettyman heard the appeal, and Edgerton wrote the opinion, Wisconsin v. FPC 205 F.2d 706 (D.C. Cir. 1953), which reversed the FPC and held that the "production and gathering" phrase did not include sales. Circuit Judge Clark wrote a dissent which agreed with Phillips, because Clark saw production and gathering as subject to regulation by the state where the well was located. Hence, Clark argued that federal regulation of producers is unnecessary. Clark also argued that the reviewing courts should defer to the FPC's interpretation of the statute.

== Supreme Court ==
The court heard argument on April 6–7, 1954. Justice Sherman Minton noted that in Federal Power Commission v. Panhandle Eastern Pipe Line Co., 337 U.S. 498, 337 U.S. 505, the Supreme Court wrote that the "natural and clear meaning" of the phrase "production or gathering of natural gas" is that it encompasses "the producing properties and gathering facilities of a natural gas company." The court read the exemption as not applying to gas sales. Minton's opinion noted, "the legislative history indicates a congressional intent to give the Commission jurisdiction over the rates of all wholesales of natural gas in interstate commerce, whether by a pipeline company or not and whether occurring before, during, or after transmission by an interstate pipeline company. There can be no dispute that the overriding congressional purpose was to plug the 'gap' in regulation of natural gas companies...." Minton justified asserting jurisdiction over wellhead sales because, "Protection of consumers against exploitation at the hands of natural gas companies was the primary aim of the Natural Gas Act." Further, Minton noted that Congress had failed to pass bills that proposed to amend the law to clearly exempt wellhead sales.

Justice Felix Frankfurter concurred with the court's decision. He noted that the purpose of the Natural Gas Act was to occupy the gap in state regulation caused by the earlier Supreme Court cases which held that states could not regulate interstate gas or electric transactions. Because states could not regulate sales for resale on gathering lines, Frankfurter argued that Congress intended the FPC to regulate such sales.

Justice William O. Douglas dissented. He noted that Congress had the power to subject sales by "independent producers" to federal regulation, but that it drafted the Natural Gas Act in a way that chose not to regulate them. He noted, "Whether it did so by the Natural Gas Act of 1938 is a political and legal controversy that has raged in the Commission and in the Congress for some years. The question is not free from doubts." Justice Douglas predicted that it would be difficult to develop a cost-based rate for gas sold by independent producers.

Justice Tom C. Clark dissented along with Justice Burton. Clark wrote, "The natural gas industry, like ancient Gaul, is divided into three parts. These parts are production and gathering, interstate transmission by pipeline, and distribution to consumers by local distribution companies." Justice Clark believed that "federal regulation of [producer] sales means an inevitable clash with a complex of state regulatory action, including minimum pricing." So Clark recognized that producing states were actively regulating producers with the objective of keeping prices high and the quantity of gas production uniform, which may conflict with federal and consuming states regulators that sought to keep prices low and the quantity of gas abundant.

== Aftermath ==
As a result of the Supreme Court decision, the FPC suddenly had to issue certificates for each interstate producer and to set cost-based prices for such sales. This resulted in a huge regulatory back log. The FPC's regulation of producers was so backlogged that when President-elect John F. Kennedy appointed James M. Landis, Dean of the Harvard Law School, to provide a transition team report in 1960, Landis declared it to be "the outstanding example in the federal government of the breakdown of the administrative process." (Note: Landis wrote, "In the Federal Power Commission the backlog of pending cases in 1959 was almost four times as great as in 1957. Only last September that Commission announced that it would take 13 years with its present staff to clear up its pending 2,313 producer rate cases pending as of July 1, 1960, and that with the contemplated 6500 cases that would be filed during that 13 year period it could not become current until 2043 A.D. even if its staff were tripled." p. 5.) The FPC dropped well-by-well regulation for setting wellhead prices on an area-wide basis on September 28, 1960. Later the FPC adopted a nationwide approach for setting wellhead ceiling prices.

Despite the regulatory delays, the decision resulted in lower natural gas prices for consumers particularly during the times of rapid oil price increases during the 1973 Arab oil embargo. However, with interstate gas prices kept low under FPC regulation, an alternative network of intrastate pipelines developed in gas producing states offering higher gas prices. Producers sought to sell gas into the intrastate markets whenever possible, resulting in natural gas shortages in the interstate market. Finally, Congress in the Natural Gas Policy Act of 1978 established a substitute set of wellhead prices set by statute and merged the interstate and intrastate gas markets. Ultimately, Congress deregulated all wellhead natural gas prices effective January 1, 1993, with the Natural Gas Wellhead Decontrol Act (NGWDA) of 1989.

== See also ==
- List of United States Supreme Court cases, volume 347
