= Alvin J. Wirtz =

American politician

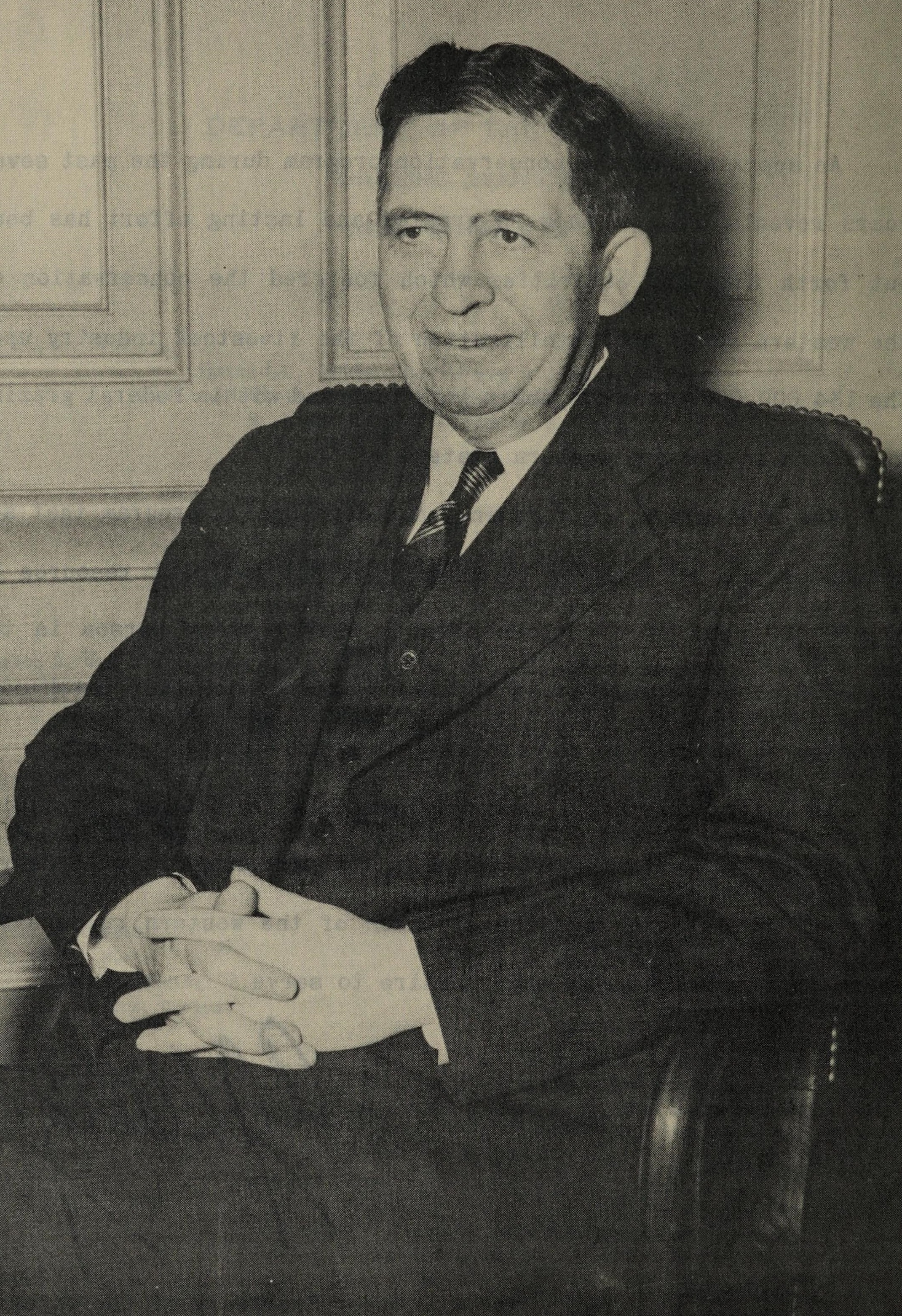

President pro tempore of the Texas Senate
- In office January 13, 1925 – 1925
- Preceded by: I. D. Fairchild
- Succeeded by: William H. Bledsoe

Member of the Texas Senate from the 15th district
- In office 1922–1930

Personal details
- Born: Alvin Jacob Wirtz; May 22, 1888 Columbus, Texas, U.S.
- Died: October 27, 1951 (aged 63) Austin, Texas, U.S.
- Resting place: Texas State Cemetery
- Party: Democratic
- Spouse: Kitty Mae Stamps (m. 1913)
- Children: Ida May Wirtz
- Education: University of Texas (LL.B.)

Alvin Jacob Wirtz (May 22, 1888 – October 27, 1951) was a lawyer, politician, and undersecretary to the Department of the Interior, and was born in Columbus, Texas to Lewis Milton and Dora (Dent) Wirtz. He attended public schools in Columbus, Texas and graduated from the University of Texas in 1910 with an LL.B. He married Kitty Mae Stamps of Seguin in 1913.

In 1917 Wirtz and his family moved to Seguin where he practiced law until 1934. Wirtz served as the Guadalupe County State Senator from 1922 to 1930. He served as the President Pro Tempore of the Texas Senate from 1925 to 1927. During his time in Seguin, Wirtz became involved in a group interested in developing the Guadalupe River as a source of hydroelectric power. Wirtz provided legal assistance to the Insull holding company Emery, Peck, and Rockwood as they built a chain of privately owned dams and hydroelectric projects on the Guadalupe River. In 1932 Wirtz was assisting the Emery, Peck, and Rockwood firm in a similar project on the Colorado River when the Insull empire collapsed.

As a result, Wirtz was made receiver of the uncompleted Hamilton Dam, later renamed Buchanan Dam. To complete the dam, Wirtz promoted the creation of the Lower Colorado River Authority (LCRA). He wrote the state legislation that created the Authority, pushed for federal funding for the Authority's dams through the federal Public Works Administration along with James P. Buchanan and Lyndon B. Johnson. As the "father of the LCRA," Wirtz also helped federal funding what would become Mansfield Dam and other dams on the Colorado River.

Wirtz was the Austin lobbyist for many oil and natural gas companies, who coordinated the successful lobbying against the New Dealer Leland Olds re-nomination for the chairmanship of the Federal Power Commission.
