= Natural Gas Act of 1938 =

- Long title: An Act to regulate the transportation and sale of natural gas in interstate commerce, and for other purposes.
- Acronyms (colloquial): NGA
- Enacted by: the 75th United States Congress
- Effective: June 21, 1938

Citations
- Public law: Pub. L. 75–688
- Statutes at Large: 52 Stat. 821

Codification
- Titles amended: 15 U.S.C.: Commerce and Trade
- U.S.C. sections created: 15 U.S.C. ch. 15B § 717 et seq.

Legislative history
- Introduced in the House as H.R. 6586 by Clarence F. Lea (D-CA) on June 16, 1937; Committee consideration by House Interstate and Foreign Commerce, Senate Interstate Commerce; Passed the House on July 1, 1937 (Passed); Passed the Senate on June 7, 1938 (Passed) with amendment; House agreed to Senate amendment on June 13, 1938 (Agreed) with further amendment; Senate agreed to House amendment on June 14, 1938 (Agreed); Signed into law by President Franklin D. Roosevelt on June 21, 1938

United States Supreme Court cases
- FPC v. Natural Gas Pipeline Co., 315 U.S. 575 (1942); United Gas Co. v. Mobile Gas Corp., 350 U.S. 332 (1956); Pan American Petroleum Corp. v. Superior Court of Del. for New Castle Cty., 366 U.S. 656 (1961); Northern Gas Co. v. Kansas Comm'n., 372 U.S. 84 (1963); Oneok, Inc. v. Learjet, Inc., No. 13-271, 575 U.S. ___ (2015); PennEast Pipeline Co. v. New Jersey, No. 19-1039, 594 U.S. ___ (2021); Hoffmann v. WBI Energy Transmission, Inc., No. 25-159, ___ U.S. ___ (2027)

The Natural Gas Act of 1938 was the first occurrence of the United States federal government regulating the natural gas industry. It was focused on regulating the rates charged by interstate natural gas transmission companies. In the years prior to the passage of the Act, concern arose about the monopolistic tendencies of the transmission companies and the fact that they were charging higher than competitive prices. The passage of the Act gave the Federal Power Commission (FPC) control over the regulation of interstate natural gas sales. Later on, the FPC was dissolved and became the Federal Energy Regulatory Commission (FERC) pursuant to a different act. FERC continues to regulate the natural gas industry to this day.

== History of regulation ==
Regulation in the natural gas market has been in place since the very beginnings of the industry. Originally in the mid-1800s, natural gas was manufactured out of coal, and delivered locally in the same area in which it was produced. Local governments saw the monopolistic tendencies of the market and began to enforce regulations. It was decided that there would be one distribution network but the rates that could be charged would be regulated by the local governments.

In the 1900s, natural gas was not only used in the locations it was produced, it began to be shipped between municipalities. Intrastate pipelines between cities began to develop and local governments no longer had the authority to regulate rates. The solution to this problem was to enlist state level public utilities commissions to oversee regulation.

In the years to follow, new technology finally allowed interstate transportation of natural gas. This brought more problems to the ease of regulation. Between the years of 1911 and 1928, states attempted to regulate many of these interstate pipelines. However, the U.S. Supreme Court ruled that state oversight of these pipelines violated the interstate commerce clause of the U.S. Constitution. This left a large gap for monopolistic business practices to occur in natural gas transmission.

In 1935, the Federal Trade Commission (FTC) issued a report which voiced its concern with the market power of natural gas utilities. Congress then passed the Public Utility Holding Company Act (PUHCA) to try to limit the natural gas holding companies power. However, this act still did not cover the regulation of interstate sales.

== Natural Gas Act of 1938 ==
In 1938, the United States Congress passed the Natural Gas Act in order to take control of interstate natural gas transmission. This was the first time the federal government became involved in regulating rates of interstate transmission. The act gave the Federal Power Commission (FPC), a government agency, jurisdiction over regulation. It was the job of the FPC to regulate the rates that transmission companies charged. The act required that companies obtain a "certificate of public convenience and necessity" from the Federal Power Commission before they could make an interstate sale of natural gas. These certificates set the maximum prices natural gas could be sold for. This meant that if gas flowed from one state to another where it was sold to a gas distribution company, the sale by the pipeline to the distributor would need a certificate. However, the final sale to retail customers were exempt from the law.

Although the Natural Gas Act might regulate both the transportation and sale of gas in interstate commerce, the production and gathering of gas was exempt from federal regulation. Oil companies claimed that because production and gathering was exempt, any sales that took place at the wellhead or along the gathering lines between the oil company that owned the well and the pipeline company was also exempt from Natural Gas Act regulation. The producers wanted to charge a wellhead price based on market forces, while consumer groups argued that the Natural Gas Act intended that both producers and pipelines should be limited to cost-based rate regulation, so that the final price paid by consumers would represent only the cost of producing, transporting and distributing the gas. The Kerr Bill was introduced in 1949 to amend the Act to specifically exclude the regulation of wellhead gas prices. Although it passed both houses it was vetoed by Truman in 1950. The dispute is said to have played a part in 1949's failed renomination of Leland Olds, the Chairman of the Federal Power Commission, who believed in aggressive use of the FPC's powers to regulate Natural Gas prices and had testified against the Kerr Bill even though the Commission itself was neutral.

In Phillips Petroleum Co. v. Wisconsin, the Supreme Court held that the sale of natural gas at the wellhead was indeed subject to regulation under the Natural Gas Act. The case resulted in federal price controls on wellhead gas prices for the next 40 years. The act also specified that "no new interstate pipeline could be built to deliver natural gas into a market already served by another pipeline." In 1942, these powers went on to cover any new transmission lines as well. Approval of the FPC was needed before a company could build an interstate transmission line. The act was passed to control the monopolistic tendencies of the market in which companies previously had the power to charge higher than competitive prices. In 1977, the FPC dissolved and the authority to regulate natural gas was transferred to the Federal Energy Regulatory Commission (FERC).

== History of FPC and FERC ==
In 1920, the FPC was established by congress to coordinate hydroelectric projects under federal control. Early on, the FPC was under joint administration of the Secretary of War, Interior, and Agriculture while the FPC only had an Executive Secretary. All of their other personnel was borrowed from these other departments. This mixture of leadership often resulted in conflicting mandates and made it difficult to design a consistent energy policy. To resolve this, in 1928 Congress voted the give the FPC enough funds to hire their own staff. In 1930, the Federal Power Act established a bipartisan commission to run the FPC. In 1938, the Natural Gas Act gave the FPC jurisdiction over interstate natural gas pipelines and wholesale sales. In 1942, this jurisdiction was expanded to cover the licensing of more natural gas facilities. In 1954, the Supreme Court decision in Phillips v. Wisconsin extended FPC jurisdiction over all wellhead sales of natural gas in interstate commerce.

Congress passed the U.S. Department of Energy Organization Act in 1977, which consolidated various energy-related agencies into a Department of Energy. Congress insisted that a separate independent regulatory body be retained, and the FPC was renamed the Federal Energy Regulatory Commission, preserving its independent status "within" the Department. In 1978, FERC was given additional responsibilities for harmonizing the regulation of wellhead gas sales in both the intrastate and interstate markets. In 1983, Congress ended federal regulation of wellhead natural gas prices. After this decision, FERC looked to increase competition in the natural gas industry.

The Energy Policy Act of 2005 expanded FERC's authority to impose mandatory reliability standards on the bulk transmission system and to impose penalties on entities that manipulate the electricity and natural gas markets. The Energy Policy Act of 2005 gave FERC additional responsibilities as outlined in FERC's Top Priorities and updated Strategic Plan. As part of that responsibility, FERC:

In 2005, the year's Energy Policy Act expanded FERC's authority to enforce reliability standards on bulk transmission systems and to impose penalties on the entities that control the electricity and natural gas markets. It also gave FERC additional responsibilities which they outline in the Top Priorities and Updated Strategic Plan. The parts of the plan that affect natural gas include that FERC:

- Regulates the transmission and sale of natural gas for resale in interstate commerce.
- Approves the siting of and abandonment of interstate natural gas facilities, including pipelines, storage and liquefied natural gas.
- Uses civil penalties and other means against energy organizations and individuals who violate FERC rules in the energy markets.
- Oversees environmental matters related to natural gas and hydroelectricity projects and major electricity policy initiatives.
- Administers accounting and financial reporting regulations and conduct of regulated companies.

== Effects ==
The Natural Gas Act of 1938 had an enormous impact on the future of not only the interstate natural gas market, but the U.S. energy policy and regulation. The natural gas industry has undergone tremendous change since 1938, and pipeline companies no longer function as resellers of gas to local distribution companies (LDCs), the ideas behind the act still impact natural gas regulation to this day. Concern about market power continues to be a key driver of natural gas regulation and monitoring of the market.

The NGA largely preempted state regulation of interstate natural gas pipelines.

== Amendments to 1938 Act ==
Chronology of amendments to the Natural Gas Act of 1938.

Date of Enactment	Public Law Number	U.S. Statute Citation	U.S. Legislative Bill	U.S. Presidential Administration
February 7, 1942	P.L. 77-444	56 Stat. 83	H.R. 5249	Franklin D. Roosevelt
July 25, 1947	P.L. 80-245	61 Stat. 459	H.R. 2956	Harry S. Truman
March 27, 1954	P.L. 83-323	68 Stat. 36	H.R. 5976	Dwight D. Eisenhower
May 21, 1962	P.L. 87-454	76 Stat. 72	S. 1595	John F. Kennedy

The 1956 Harris-Fulbright Natural Gas Bill aimed to amend the Act in order to deregulate the Natural Gas market, but it failed after being vetoed by President Eisenhower.

== Works cited ==
- Huitt, Ralph K. (1952). "Federal Regulation of the Uses of Natural Gas". American Political Science Review. 46 (2): 455–469. doi:10.2307/1950840.
- This article incorporates some material from Federal Energy Regulatory Commission.
