= Richard C. McCarty =

American psychologist

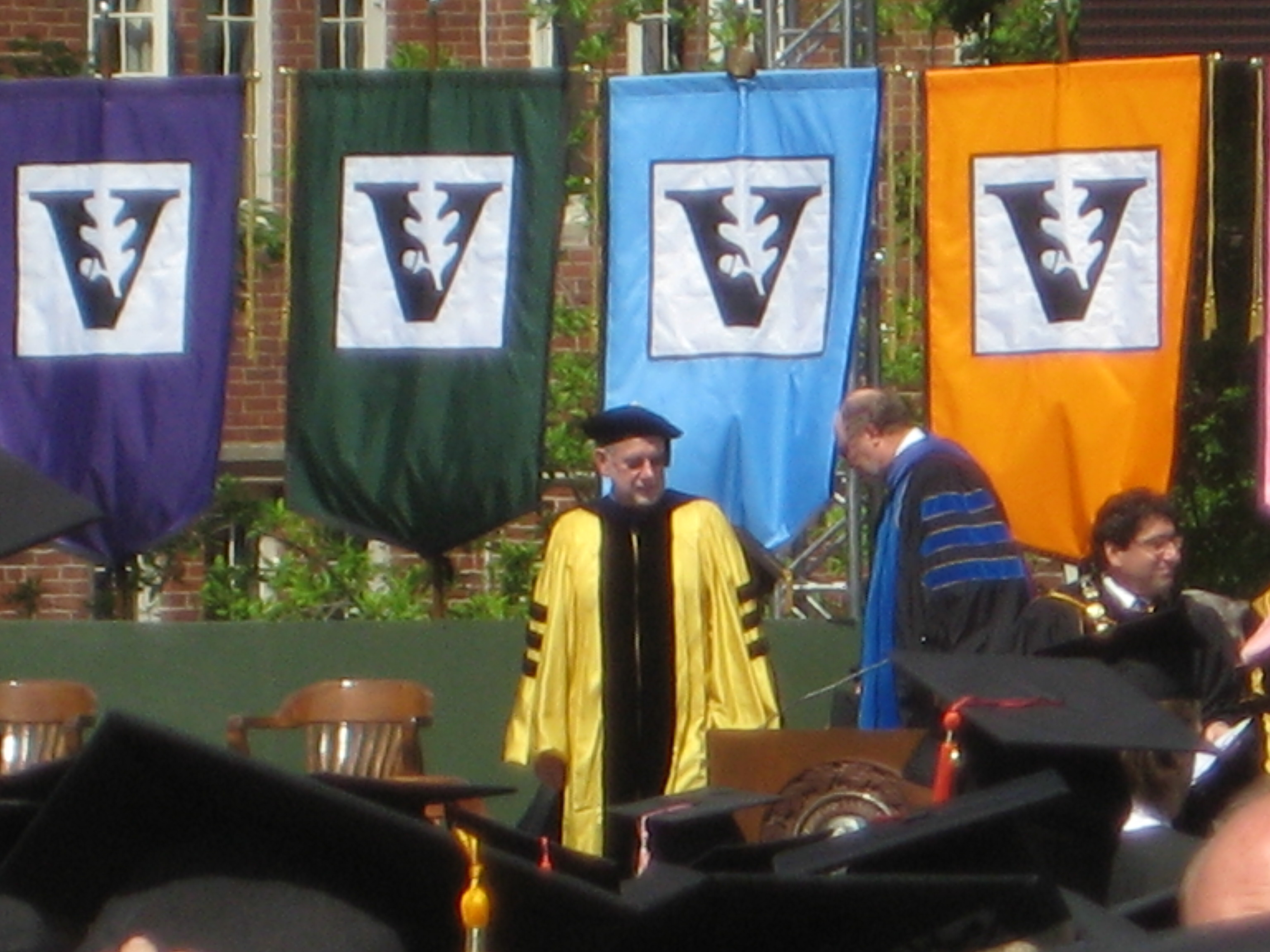
- McCarty at Vanderbilt's 2008 Commencement
- Born: July 12, 1947; Portsmouth, Virginia
- Education: Old Dominion University; Johns Hopkins University
- Scientific career
- Fields: Psychology
- Workplaces: University of Virginia; Vanderbilt University
- Doctoral advisor: Charles H. Southwick

Richard C. McCarty (born July 12, 1947) is a professor of psychology and the former provost and vice chancellor of academic affairs at Vanderbilt University in Nashville, Tennessee. Prior to serving as provost, he was dean of Vanderbilt's College of Arts and Science.

== Education ==
McCarty grew up in Portsmouth, Virginia, and earned both his bachelor's and his master's degrees from Old Dominion University. He earned his Ph.D. in pathobiology from what is now the Bloomberg School of Public Health at Johns Hopkins University in Maryland in 1976.

== Career ==
McCarty began his career at the National Institute of Mental Health, where he worked as a research associate in pharmacology. He also served as a lieutenant commander in the U.S. Public Health Service. In 1978, he was appointed assistant professor of psychology at the University of Virginia, where he remained until 1998. During his time at Virginia, he served as chair of the Department of Psychology from 1990 to 1998.

In 1998, McCarty was named executive director for Science at the American Psychological Association in Washington, D.C., where he helped the APA launch the "Decade of Behavior". The Decade of Behavior, a nickname for the 2000s and successor to the 1990s' "Decade of the Brain", was a public education campaign—endorsed by more than 70 professional associations across a variety of disciplines—to bring attention to the importance of behavioral and social science research. McCarty also spent time visiting universities and regional psychological associations to discuss how the APA might better represent psychologists nationally.

Vanderbilt's College of Arts and Science named McCarty as its new dean in 2001. In addition to his decanal duties, McCarty taught a psychology seminar for first-year undergraduate students entitled "Stress, Health, and Behavior" and had a dual appointment in the Department of Pharmacology in the School of Medicine. On May 6, 2008, McCarty was elevated to the university provostship, replacing Nicholas S. Zeppos, who was himself elevated to the university chancery. McCarty stepped down from the position of provost on June 30, 2014; he joined the Vanderbilt Psychology Department faculty after a yearlong leave.

Much of McCarty's research has centered on behavioral and physiological adaptations to stress, and he has written more than 30 chapters and 150 articles for various publications. In addition, McCarty served as the editor of American Psychologist and was the founding editor-in-chief of Stress. In 2020, his monograph, Stress and Mental Disorders: Insights From Animal Models, was published by Oxford University Press. He is currently working on a textbook, Stress, Health, and Disease, which is under contract with Guilford Press and has an expected publication date of 2022.

== Personal life ==
McCarty married his high school sweetheart, Sheila, soon after graduation. They have four children and four grandchildren.
