= Decade of the Mind =

Neuroscience advancement initiative

The Decade of the Mind Project was an international initiative to advance scientific understanding of how the mind and complex behaviors are related to the activity of human brains. The problem of explaining the mind is so complex as to require "big science" to make real progress. The effort stemmed from concerns in the scientific community that mind research (as opposed to simply brain research) had received inadequate support relative to its importance in human lives. The Project began with James L. Olds, the director of the Krasnow Institute for Advanced Study, convening of a conference of leading US scientists at George Mason University in May 2007 which led to The Decade of the Mind Manifesto, published as a letter to the editor in Science. The Manifesto called for a new $4B US investment in research across the many disciplines of mind research over the decade from 2012 to 2022. Since the May 2007 meeting, the Decade of the Mind Project has held several other conferences across the United States and has been internationalized with a conference in Berlin, Germany, in September 2009 and a conference in Singapore in October 2010. The conference in Berlin, Germany, organised by Professor Manfred Spitzer, focused on the impact of this project on education, where they reported that this project could see improved educational outcomes, particularly in STEM disciplines (science, technology, engineering, and mathematics). Around a year after this, they held a conference in Singapore in October 2010, organized by the Singapore Ministry of Defense, which was centered on the concept of applying the knowledge of human minds to both machines and the augmented cognition for human beings. The effort eventually was subsumed into the Obama Administration's BRAIN Initiative.

== Background ==
During the 1990s US president George Herbert Walker Bush declared a decade of research to center on neuroscience. The resulting Decade of the Brain was a well publicized inter-US agency initiative that responded to the declaration. The two lead federal agencies in that initiative were the Library of Congress and the National Institute of Mental Health (part of the larger National Institutes of Health). Although the initiative did not receive the level of funding as the Human Genome Project, it did serve to catalyze significant advances in our understanding of the brain particularly in the context of brain diseases. The Decade of the Brain project was followed in 2001 by a Decade of Behavior Project that also attempted to bring together scientists, this time to understand how human behavior emerges.

== A new decade project ==
More recent advances in brain research, in combination with the scientific consensus that mind indeed emerges as a result of the activities of the brain, has led to the notion of a new "Decade" project, one dedicated to understanding the phenomenon of mind within the context of neuroscience and psychology. In May 2007, a group of scientists met at George Mason University's Krasnow Institute for Advanced Study to map out a roadmap for the Initiative. The starting point was the earlier Decade of the Brain project Decade of the Mind Videos - Think. Learn. Succeed - George Mason University. The Decade of the Mind project sought as much as $4 billion in federal support over the course of the ten-year-long initiative. The goal was to use the new federal support to jump start advances in our scientific understanding of mind as well as to use that same research to serve as an economic engine for the United States. From an international perspective, the Decade of the Mind project sought to involve scientists from across the globe in this effort, not only to improve the public health, but also to create new jobs from the new technologies developed under the Project.

The Decade of the Mind initiative, by necessity, was trans-disciplinary and multi-agency in its approach. Success required research that reached across disparate fields such as cognitive science, medicine, neuroscience, psychology, mathematics, engineering, neurotechnology and computer science. Additional important insights needed to come from areas as diverse as systems biology, cultural anthropology, social science, robotics, and automation technology. For these reasons, the Decade of the Mind initiative focused on these four broad areas:

1. Healing and protecting the mind: This is the notion of improving the public health by ameliorating or curing diseases of the brain that affect the mind. An example of such a disease is Alzheimer's disease. Reducing the burden of such diseases would be a major deliverable for the Project.
2. Understanding the mind: This aspect of the initiative seeks to understand how the mind actually emerges from brain functional activity. Some of the key characteristics of the mind which are still not understood include consciousness, memory and dreams. The mystery of the mind remains one of the biggest scientific challenges for this and future generations.
3. Enriching the mind: Improving learning outcomes in education is a key component of the initiative. Here the hope is that advances in neuroscience research can be applied to K-20 schooling to create a more educated future workforce better able to compete for quality jobs.
4. Modeling the mind: A key approach to understanding the mind is to model it either analytically or using computers. Such models of mind may facilitate the creation of new hypotheses which can then be tested in the laboratory or clinic. Modeling the mind may also allow for the creation of new applications, technologies and inventions.

== The first Decade of the Mind symposium ==
The Decade of the Mind symposium was well-covered by the news media and led to a manifesto that was published in the journal Science authored by the symposium participants.

== Follow-on to the Decade of the Mind symposium ==
Following the symposium, decision-makers from multiple US agencies assembled to react to the Manifesto and to imagine how their agencies might participate in the proposed Decade of the Mind initiative (Decade of the Mind II). A further follow-on scientific conference was held May 7–9, 2008 at the Great Ape Trust in Des Moines, Iowa. The symposium, titled "Emergence of Mind" examined how mind emerges in animals, particularly the great apes. This third symposium included 9 plenary sessions provided by luminaries from their respective fields. Each speaker addressed the general topic of "Consciousness and Mind in Nonhuman Primates", some from the perspective of their experimental work with primates in captivity and others, from their studies of primates conducted in the wild. Additionally, two sessions were devoted to philosophical perspectives on nonhuman consciousness and the evolution of consciousness and mind.

The fourth symposium was held at Santa Ana Reservation, New Mexico, on January 13–15, 2009. The conference was organized by the Sandia National Laboratory. It focused on the emergence of mind in machines. The meeting also focused on the ethical, legal and social implications of new neurotechnologies that might emerge from the Decade Project.

The Decade of the Mind Project became internationalized with a European initiative in Berlin, Germany, at a meeting in September 2009, and an Asian Decade of the Mind Project Symposium kicked off in Singapore in October 2010.

== See also ==
- BRAIN Initiative
- Brain mapping
- Decade of the Brain
- Human Brain Project (EU)
