= Leland Olds Station =

Power station in North Dakota, United States

Coordinates: 47°16′52″N 101°19′15″W

Leland Olds Station is a coal fired power station in Stanton, North Dakota. It is run by the Basin Electric Power Cooperative.

It was built in 1961 and named after the previous Chairman of the Federal Power Commission, Leland Olds.

As of 2026, it is estimated that the plant causes 11 deaths per year due to soot and smog pollution.
