= Krasnow Institute for Advanced Study =

US research institute

Coordinates: 38.82775°N 77.31559°W

The Krasnow Institute for Advanced Study brings together researchers from many disciplines to study the phenomenon known as the mind. A unit of George Mason University, the Krasnow Institute also serves as a center for doctoral education in neuroscience. Research at the institute is funded by agencies such as the National Institutes of Health, the National Science Foundation and the Department of Defense.

== History ==
Krasnow Institute building front entrance

The Krasnow Institute was chartered in 1990 as a result of a bequest from Shelley Krasnow, a long-time resident of the National Capital Area. The work of the institute began in 1993 with a scientific conference, co-sponsored with The Santa Fe Institute (SFI) and hosted at George Mason University. This conference on "The Mind, the Brain, and Complex Adaptive Systems" brought together an unusual group of scientists including two Nobel laureates (Murray Gell-Mann and Herbert A. Simon) and produced new approaches to this frontier in addition to a book published by SFI.

These efforts set the institute on the path of human cognition within the context of the intersection of neuroscience, cognitive psychology and computer sciences.

The first director of the Institute was Harold Morowitz, who served in that role until 1997. In 1998, James L. Olds was appointed director and served until 2014.

== Current Institute ==
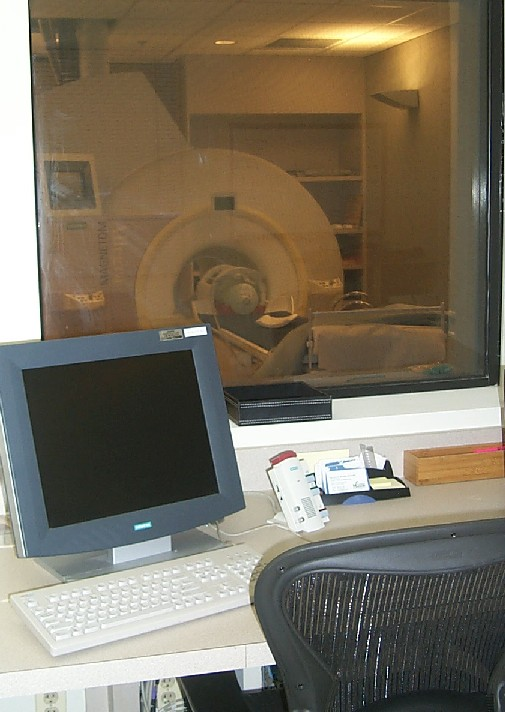
MRI viewed from console room

The Krasnow Institute is home to a scientific community of 100 (many of them PhDs) most of whom are also either faculty or trainees at George Mason University. The range of their research on cognition spans from molecules to mind. The institute is housed in a dedicated 51,000-square-foot (4,700 m^{2}) facility on the Fairfax Campus of George Mason which includes extensive wet-laboratories, computer labs, a 3T MRI human brain imaging center, a cellular imaging facility, as well as faculty offices and breakout space. Additional research space on the Fairfax campus houses the institute's Center for Social Complexity.

== An Academic Unit of George Mason University ==
The Krasnow Institute is also an academic unit of George Mason University. It houses the department of Molecular Neuroscience, which contains an interdisciplinary neuroscience doctoral program.

The institute hosted several events in the "Decade of the Mind" initiative, which urged the U.S. Congress to invest in understanding how mind emerges from brain.

The institute has collaborated closely with the Janelia Research Campus of Howard Hughes Medical Institute, the Allen Institute for Brain Science and the National Institutes of Health to develop better methods of reconstructing neuronal architectures.

== Research ==
Researchers at the institute include neuroscientists, bio-engineers, computer scientists, and computational social scientists. The institute's various research programs are conducted by three centers (described below) and multiple lab groups.

=== The Center for Neural Informatics, Neural Structures, and Neural Plasticity (CN3) ===
The Center for Neural Informatics, Neural Structures, and Neural Plasticity (CN3) studies neuroinformatic and computational approaches to neuroplasticity and neuroanatomy. CN3 researchers investigate the relationship between brain structure, activity, and function from the subcellular to the network level, with a specific focus on the biophysical and biochemical mechanisms of learning and memory. In the long term, we seek to create large-scale, biologically plausible network models of entire portions of the mammalian brain, such as the hippocampus, to understand the neural circuits and cellular events underlying the expression, storage, and retrieval of associative memory.

=== Center for Neuroeconomics ===
Krasnow scientists are using functional magnetic resonance imaging of the human brain to study human interactions within the context of free-markets. These studies allow, for the first time, the elucidation of a biological basis for economic decisions.

=== Center for Social Complexity (CSC) ===
Scientific projects at the Center for Social Complexity focus on investigating social systems and processes on multiple scales: groups, organizations, economies, societies, regions, international systems. Researchers use a variety of interdisciplinary tools, including multi-agent systems and agent-based models (including the MASON toolkit in Java), cellular automata and other social simulation methods, network and graph-theoretic models, GIS (geographic information systems), events data analysis, complexity-theoretic models and other advanced computational methods. The center houses a specialized simulation environment (the Simulatorium), where faculty, postdoctoral researchers, and graduate research assistants collaborate in a variety of projects. Conflict and cooperation, emergent economic systems, network dynamics, and long-term societal adaptation to environmental change are among the current lines of investigation. Funding for the center is provided by grants from the US National Science Foundation, the Department of Defense, and other agencies. The center does work in computational sociology.
