= Medial forebrain bundle =

Complex group of fibers in the brain

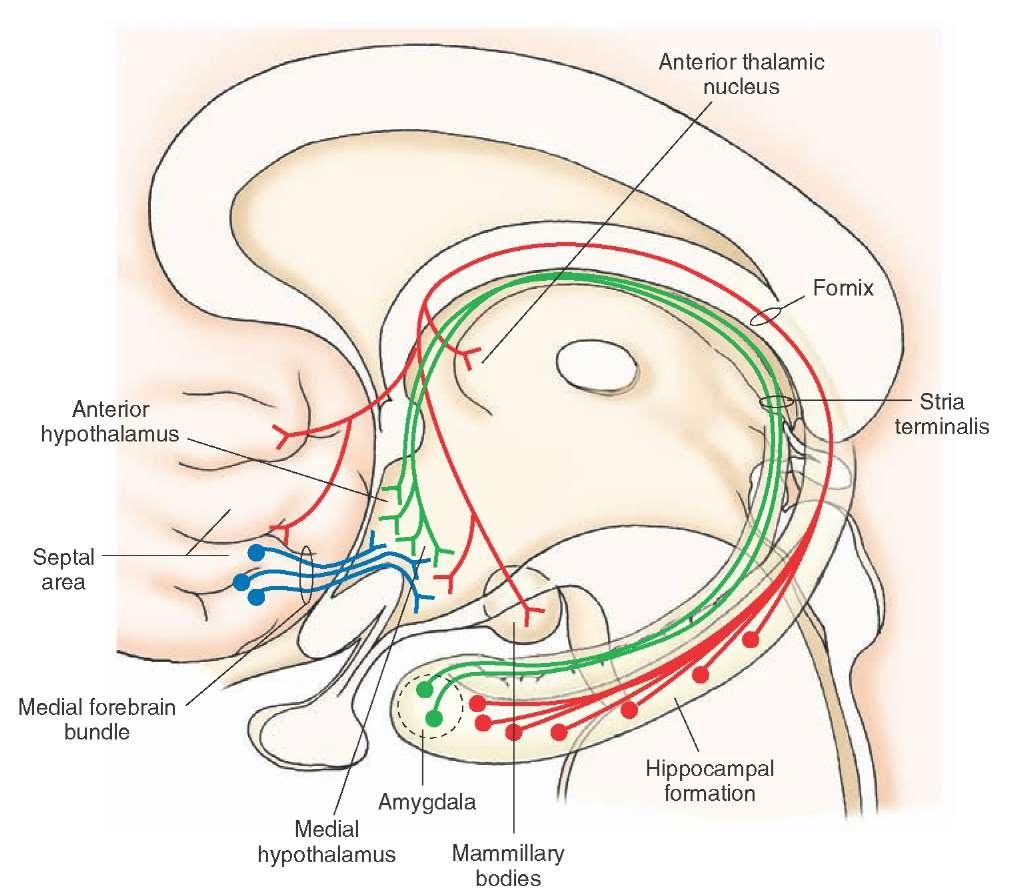
- Anatomical diagram of medial forebrain bundle. These neural fibres connect the septal area in forebrain with medial hypothalamus.

Details

Identifiers
- Latin: fasciculus medialis telencephali
- MeSH: D008474
- NeuroNames: 433
- NeuroLex ID: birnlex_908
- TA98: A14.1.08.955
- TA2: 5764
- FMA: 62064

The medial forebrain bundle (MFB) is a neural pathway containing fibers from the basal olfactory regions, the periamygdaloid region and the septal nuclei, as well as fibers from brainstem regions, including the ventral tegmental area and nigrostriatal pathway.

== Anatomy ==
The MFB passes through the lateral hypothalamus and the basal forebrain in a rostral-caudal direction. The MFB has its main projections to these regions of Brodmann areas (BA) 8, 9, 10, 11, 11m. The superior frontal region of MFB projects to BA 8, 9, 10; the rostral middle frontal projects to dorsolateral prefrontal cortex (BA 9, 10); lateral orbitofrontal of MFB shows its projections to nucleus accumbens septi (NAC) and ventral striatum as subcortical reward associated structures.

It contains both ascending and descending fibers. The mesolimbic pathway, which is a collection of dopaminergic neurons that projects from the ventral tegmental area to the nucleus accumbens, is a component pathway of the MFB.

The MFB is one of the two major pathways connecting the limbic forebrain, midbrain, and hindbrain. The other one is the dorsal diencephalic conduction (DDC) system. The two pathways seem to have parallel neural circuits, and share similar physiology and function.

== Function ==
It is commonly accepted that the MFB is a part of the reward system, involved in the integration of reward and pleasure. Electrical stimulation of the medial forebrain bundle is believed to cause sensations of pleasure. This hypothesis is based upon intracranial self-stimulation (ICSS) studies. Animals will work for MFB ICSS, and humans report that MFB ICSS is intensely pleasurable.

Another research technique that was used in determining the function of the MFB was microdialysis. Reinforcing electrical stimulation of the MFB using this method has shown to cause a release in dopamine in the nucleus accumbens. Other microdialysis studies have shown that the presence of natural reinforcers such as food, water, and a sex partner cause a release in dopamine in the nucleus accumbens. This shows that the electrical stimulation of the MFB causes a similar effect compared to natural reinforcers.

The medial forebrain bundle has been shown to be linked to an individual's grief/sadness system through regulation of the individual's seeking/pleasure system.

== Potential role in diagnosis/treatment ==
The medial forebrain bundle may serve as a target in treating treatment-resistant depression. Since the MFB connects areas of the brain which are involved with motivated behavior, mood regulation, and antidepressant response the stimulation of the MFB through deep brain stimulation could be an effective form of treatment. However, the anatomical definition of the tract system targeted by deep brain stimulation in humans has been intensively discussed and may indeed form the anterior limb of the internal capsule (and not the medial forebrain bundle proper, as defined in rodents). This topic has been worked up by Suzanne Haber and other anatomists in detailed review articles. Subjects that receive the deep brain stimulation treatment in the medial forebrain bundle have been reported to have high remission rates with normative functioning and no adverse side effects.

The medial forebrain bundle may also serve to study abuse-related drug effects through intracranial self-stimulation. ICSS targets the MFB at the level of the lateral hypothalamus and elicits a range of responses from the subject through stimulation to acquire a baseline of responses. From this baseline the subject is then exposed to varying levels of stimuli in that are high/low in amplitude and frequency. These responses are then compared to the baseline of the subject to detect for sensitivity to the stimuli. Based on the sensitivity of the response from the subject, a level of inference on the drug abuse potential can be made.

== Animal research ==
In animal studies studying the effects of Levodopa-induced dyskinesia, a major complication in the treatment of Parkinson's disease, lesions in the medial forebrain bundle show a maximum level of severity and sensitivity to levodopa and provide insight into the mechanisms of Levodopa-induced dyskinesia. Other lesions in the mouse, particularly in the striatum 6-OHDA, show a variable sensitivity to levodopa and shows the difference in lesion severity based on location.

In a study with rats, using intracranial self-stimulation implanted in the medial forebrain bundle, rats treated with nicotine and methamphetamine showed an increased speed at which they pressed a lever to induce self-stimulation. The study indicates that the medial forebrain bundle may be directly linked to motivational behavior that is induced by drugs.

In a research on rats, the deep brain stimulation (DBS) on the MFB causes an increase in dopamine for 40 seconds which is above baseline but after 40 seconds, it wasn't increased above baseline.
