= Decade of the Brain =

Initiative of the United States Government in the 1990s

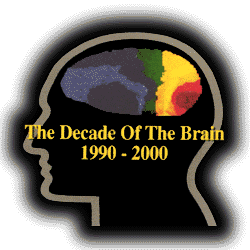
Logo

The Decade of the Brain was a designation for 1990–1999/2000 by U.S. president George H. W. Bush as part of a larger effort involving the Library of Congress and the National Institute of Mental Health of the National Institutes of Health "to enhance public awareness of the benefits to be derived from brain research".

The interagency initiative was conducted through a variety of activities including publications and programs aimed at introducing members of Congress, their staffs, and the general public to cutting-edge research on the human brain and encouraging public dialog on the ethical, philosophical, and humanistic implications of these discoveries.

== Inception ==
During the 1980s, a renewed interest in the localization of neural phenomena to distinct anatomical regions of the brain led to a rapid uptick in more direct study of the brain and its psychological implications. In 1980, the Society for Neuroscience founded a committee dedicated to lobbying directly with the United States Congress for increased neuroscience funding, as well as encouraging members of the society to contact their own representatives. This group, alongside the National Committee for Research in Neurological and Communicative Disorders, the National Science Foundation’s Interagency Working Group in Neuroscience, the Association of American Medical Colleges and the Inter-Society Council for Biology and Medicine, met with legislators in Washington D.C. throughout the 1980s in order to educate them about the importance of neuroscience research and advocate for fiscal appropriations.

In 1987, the National Committee for Research in Neurological and Communicative Disorders collaborated with an National Institute of Neurological Disorders and Stroke advisory council to propose a large-scale attempt to build on recent advances in order to further research and clinical development in neuroscience. This proposal to designate the decade, beginning January 1990, as the "Decade of the Brain", was sponsored by Representative Silvio O. Conte, and passed by the United States Congress in a joint resolution on March 8, 1989. A formal proclamation was thereafter issued by then President of the United States George H. W. Bush on July 18, 1990.

== Publicity and popularization efforts ==
Responding to the presidential mandate, professional organizations began to support the effort via further promulgation of Decade of the Brain materials, and Decade of the Brain lectures became commonplace at annual meetings of prominent scientific communities. Nevertheless, in the early years of the decade, the neuroscience community was concerned that their efforts would not lead to an increase in funding of neuroscience research. David J. Mahoney, at the time the chairman of the Charles A. Dana Foundation for brain research, arranged a gathering of influential neuroscientists in Cold Spring Harbor in 1992 to discuss ways to improve the Decade of the Brain movement. The meeting resulted in the signing by 60 scientists of a formal Declaration of ten research goals to be accomplished by the end of the decade, as well as personal commitments made by those scientists to speak to the public about their research using appropriate lay language. The Dana Foundation also sponsored the publication of newspapers, newsletters, journals, and other outlets to convey neuroscience research, alongside $34 million in research grants for brain research, and the founding of Brain Awareness Week, a global campaign to promote public interest in neuroscience.

== Global adoption ==
The United States' neuroscience community's publication of Decade of the Brain led international communities to adopt the movement as well. The Government of Japan invested $125 million into neuroscience research in 1997, leading to the development of the Brain Science Institute. The Government of India founded the National Brain Research Centre during the same year. In 1998, the Chinese Institute of Neuroscience was founded.

== Impact ==
During the time period of the Decade of the Brain, the field of neuroscience made rapid gains and in several important ways rose to the forefront of both scientific and public interest. American neurologist Lewis P. Rowland stated:

As a public relations gambit, the Decade was a success. As a way of engaging scientists, legislators, and leaders of voluntary agencies, it was a success. As an education program it successfully mirrored the wonderful scientific and technological advances. As part of the preparation for the bipartisan doubling of the neuroscience budget, the Decade was a clear success.We cannot be certain the Decade had anything to do with these advances, which might well have come without the public hue, but the advances and the education marched together.

Several scientific accomplishments occurred during the Decade of the Brain Among them are:

- the development of fMRI BOLD neural imaging and the emergence of the field of computational neuroscience
- the discovery of neural plasticity and critical periods of neural development
- the development of second-generation antidepressants and anti-psychotics
- the discovery of genetic mutations responsible for Huntington's disease, ALS, and Rett syndrome
- the discovery of the neural origins and impacts of alcoholism

Society also benefited from the decade, through major cash infusions into early childhood development programs. Due to the funding of research into the physiological impact on the brain of children's early experiences, many states in the US began a great push for pre-school education. Today, almost 20 years later, most children in the US are enrolled in these types of programs.

The Decade of the Brain also inspired the offshoot project, the Decade of the Mind.

== See also ==
- BRAIN Initiative
- Brain mapping
- Decade of the Mind
- Human Brain Project (EU)
- Outline of brain mapping
- Outline of the human brain
