= David R. Williams (scientist) =

Saint Lucian-American professor and scientist

David R. Williams SLMM
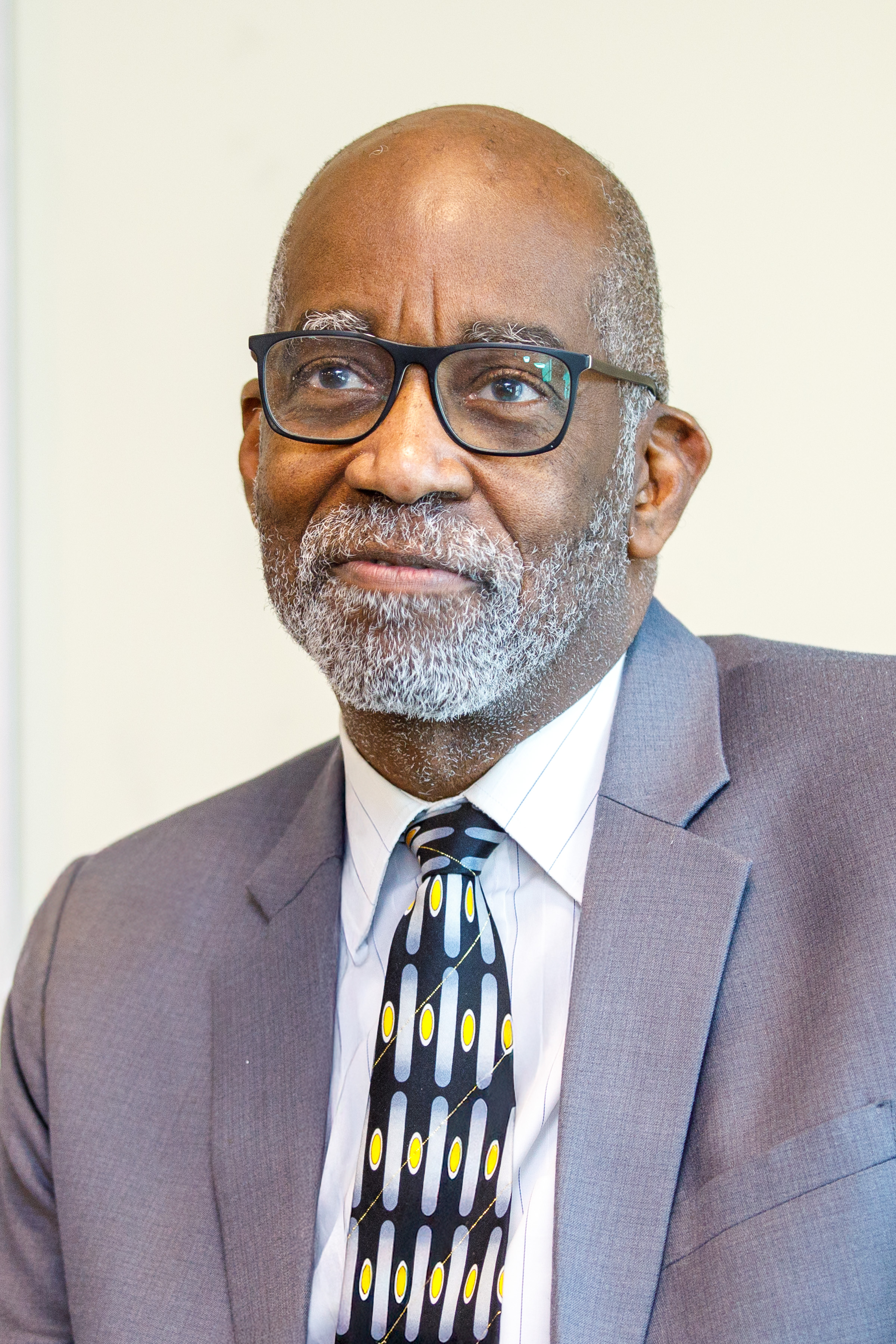
- Williams in 2023
- Born: David Rudyard Williams; June 12, 1954 (age 72); Aruba
- Citizenship: American; Saint Lucian
- Education: Caribbean Union College (B.Th. Hons.), Andrews University (M.Div.), Loma Linda University (M.P.H.), University of Michigan (M.A., Ph.D.)
- Known for: Research on race and health
- Awards: 2004 Decade of Behavior Research Award
- Scientific career
- Fields: Sociology; Public health
- Workplaces: Harvard School of Public Health; Harvard University; University of Michigan; Yale University
- Thesis: Socioeconomic Differentials in Health: The Role of Psychosocial Factors (1986)
- Website: scholar.harvard.edu/davidrwilliams

External videos
- "Covid-19: Why race matters for health", Knowable Magazine, 06.03.2021
- How racism makes us sick, TEDMED, November 2016
- HGP10 Symposium: Genomics and Disparities in Health and Health Care - David Williams, April 30, 2013

David Rudyard Williams SLMM (born 1954) is the Florence Sprague Norman and Laura Smart Norman Professor of Public Health at the Harvard School of Public Health, he also is a professor of African and African American Studies and also a Sociology at Harvard University.

== Education ==
He is originally educated in theology and in ministry at Caribbean Union College and Andrews University, He then studied public health and sociology. Williams also holds a Master of Public Health from Loma Linda University and a MA and PhD in sociology from the University of Michigan.

== Career ==
From 1986 to 1992, he was teaching at Yale University, where he held appointments in both sociology and public health. In 1992, Williams joined the faculty of the University of Michigan, where the position he had was Harold Cruse Collegiate Professor of Sociology, a senior research scientist at the Institute of Social Research, and a professor of epidemiology in the School of Public Health.

In 2006, Williams joined Harvard as the Norman Professor of Public Health. Williams was a senior research advisor for the 2008 PBS documentary series "Unnatural Causes: Is Inequality Making Us Sick". His 2016 TED Talk entitled "How Racism Makes Us Sick" has been translated into 18 languages and has been viewed over 1 million times.

== Research ==
Williams' research focuses on how social factors such as education, income, and race affect physical and mental health. He is also known for his research on the health effects of racial discrimination.

According to Harvard University, ScholarGPS, recognized Williams in 2023 as the leading scholar for citations in African American studies.

== Honors and awards ==
In 2001, Williams was elected a member of the Institute of Medicine (later the National Academy of Medicine). In 2007, he became a member of the American Academy of Arts and Sciences. He is also a member of the American Sociological Association, the American Public Health Association, and the American Psychological Association. In 2019, he became a member of the National Academy of Sciences.

In 2009, Williams was named the most highly cited black scholar in the social sciences by the Journal of Blacks in Higher Education. He was one of the world's most influential scientific minds as listed by Thomson Reuters in 2015.

In 2004, Williams was a recipient of one of the inaugural Decade of Behavior Research Awards from the American Psychological Association. In 2011, he received the Leo G. Reeder Award for Distinguished Contributions to Medical Sociology from the American Sociological Association. In 2013, Williams received the Stephen Smith Award for Distinguished Contributions in Public Health, New York Academy of Medicine. In 2014, he was the recipient of the Lemuel Shattuck Award for Significant Contributions to the Field of Public Health, awarded by the Massachusetts Public Health Association. In 2015, he received the Distinguished Leadership in Psychology Award from the American Psychological Association. In 2017, he was the recipient of the Leonard I. Pearlin Award for Distinguished Contributions to the Sociological Study of Mental Health.
