= Leland Olds hearing =

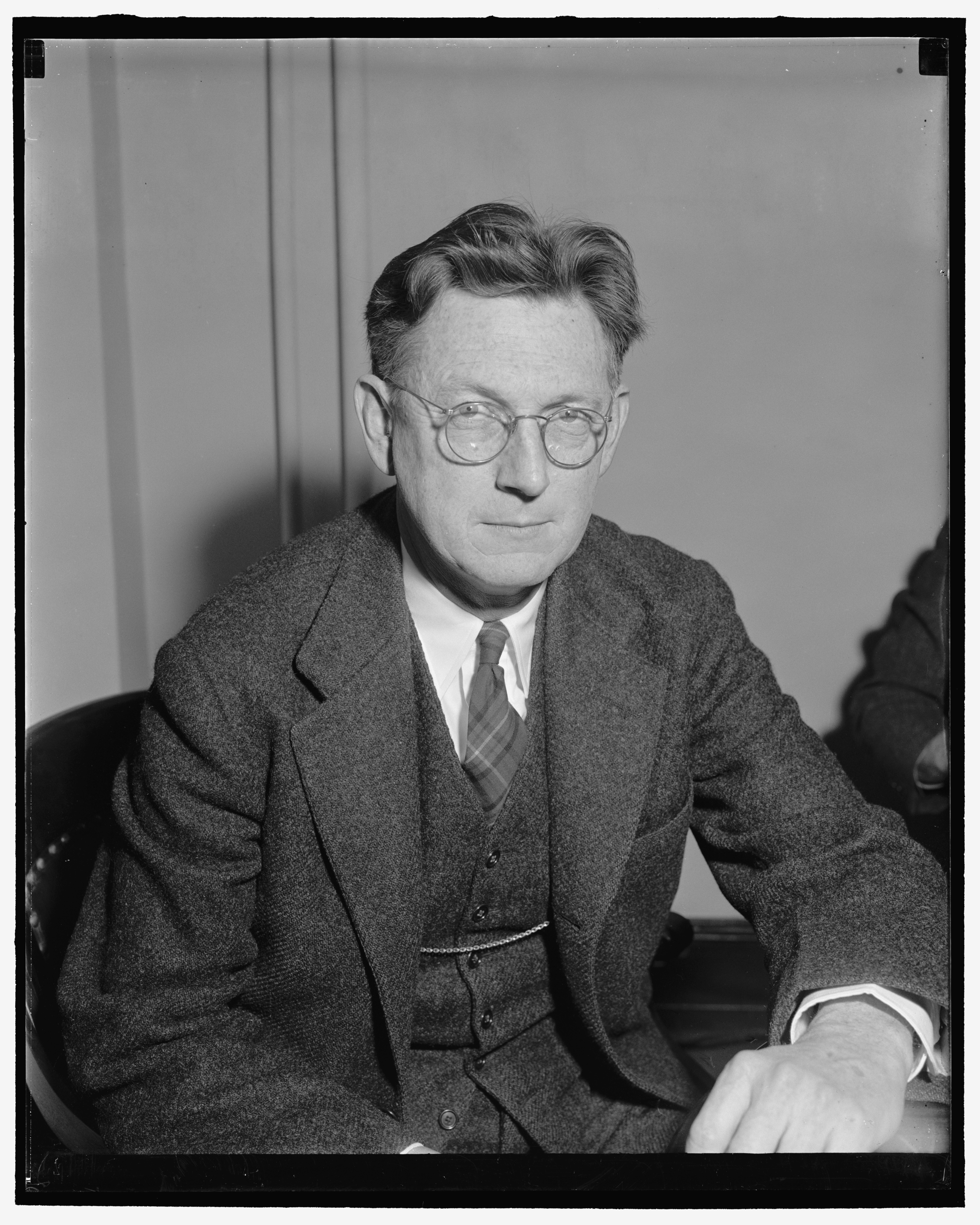
Leland Olds in 1940

The United States Senate failed to confirm the re-nomination of Leland Olds as the head of the Federal Power Commission in 1949. Olds was an economist who in the 1920s, before he was appointed by Roosevelt as chairman of the commission, had been the Industrial editor for the Federated Press. It was a left wing news agency which served Trade Union newspapers but had an ambiguous relationship with the Communist Party USA. The Olds hearings have been cited as a precursor to McCarthyism.

== Tenure in the Federal Power Commission ==
The Federal Power Commission was a five-member regulatory body appointed by the President and confirmed by the Senate. One of the FPC's strongest leaders was Leland Olds who by 1949 had served two terms. Olds' insistence on enforcing the Natural Gas Act of 1938 raised the ire of the oil industry in Texas.

In 1944, when Olds was renominated by Roosevelt, his writing for the Federated Press had been brought up by the anti-New Deal Republican Edward Moore of Oklahoma used as evidence that Olds was "opposed fundamentally to private enterprise." During these re-nomination hearings a number of state public utility commissioners were opposed to Olds due to concerns with over centralizing utility regulation away from the States. However Olds was confirmed both within the Committee and on the Senate floor.

In 1948 in the debate over the deregulating Kerr Bill, Olds together with another Commissioner Claude L. Draper published a study, and also testified, that forcefully argued that the Federal Power Commission had both the authority and the duty to regulate the prices that Natural Gas was sold to wholesalers. The Federal Power Commission did not take a position on the Bill and it was opposed by Senators from the gas-producing Southwest, including Robert Kerr of Oklahoma, who was seen at the time as Olds' principle opponent for re-nomination, and Lyndon Johnson of Texas.

== Jurisdiction ==
Like many other Presidential appointments Olds would need to be approved by the Senate, which in almost every case would delegate that task to a Senate committee, in this case the Committee on Interstate and Foreign Commerce. The nomination had been lodged very close to the end of Olds' term due to the delay in the nomination of another pro regulation commissioner, Thomas C. Buchanan.

In 1949 Lyndon Johnson persuaded the committee chairman, Edwin C. Johnson to make him chairman of a subcommittee and later that this subcommittee should be tasked with Olds' renomination. As well as Lyndon and Edwin Johnson the members of the subcommittee were Ernest McFarland, Herbert O'Conor, Clyde Reed, Homer Capehart and John Bricker

== Hearings ==
The witnesses who testified against Olds were all directly or indirectly connected to oil and natural gas interests. While the electricity companies made no public opposition although there was an assumption that they privately opposed Olds. However there were Republicans who were not attached to oil interests who were opposed to Olds' regulatory ideas, with both his home state New York senators, future Eisenhower Republicans Irving Ives and John Foster Dulles both declining to support his re-nomination.

Robert Caro's book Master of the Senate claims that Lyndon Johnson, whose campaign in the 1948 United States Senate election in Texas received extensive funding from Texas oilmen, defeated Olds' re-appointment by orchestrating a smear campaign to accuse Olds of Communist sympathies. This was co-ordinated by the Texan lobbyist Alvin Wirtz to dig up old writings which were then taken out of context to falsely paint Olds as a communist or communist sympathizer. The House Un-American Activities Committee prepared a memorandum summarizing the information in their files.

The subcommittee in charge of reappointment was stacked against Olds, with the main anti-Olds witness, Representative John Lyle being coached by Johnson. Olds had support from liberals such as Eleanor Roosevelt and the liberal Democratic Senator Paul Douglas.

Despite coming out publicly against Olds, at the end of the nomination fight Johnson came up to Olds and said "Lee, I hope you understand there's nothing personal in this. We're still friends, aren't we? It's only politics, you know."

Truman insisted on the nomination going to the Senate floor although Olds faced a similar rejection by 53 votes to 13.

== Aftermath ==
Following such episodes, the FPC was reluctant to impose price regulation on the producers with many regulations being reversed after he left.

The Olds hearings were seen by many as a template for later McCarthyite purges.

The lack of action by the FPC after Olds left was seen as the cause of the Phillips Petroleum Co. v. Wisconsin lawsuit.
