= James Olds =

American psychologist (1922–1976)

- Born: May 30, 1922; Chicago, Illinois
- Died: August 21, 1976 (aged 54)
- Education: Amherst College; Harvard University
- Known for: "Pleasure centers in the brain"
- Father: Leland Olds
- Awards: Newcomb Cleveland Prize
- Scientific career
- Fields: Neuroscience
- Workplaces: McGill University; UCLA; University of Michigan; California Institute of Technology
- Thesis: "The Acquisition of Motives" (1952)
- Doctoral advisor: Richard L. Solomon
- Other academic advisors: Donald O. Hebb

James Olds (May 30, 1922 – August 21, 1976) was an American psychologist who is considered to be one of the founders of modern neuroscience. In 1954, while working at McGill University, Olds and Peter Milner made their most important discovery, initially considered to be the brain's "pleasure centres", and now known to be parts of its reward system. Olds received numerous distinctions ranging from election to the United States National Academy of Sciences to the Newcomb Cleveland Prize of the American Association for the Advancement of Science.

== Biography ==
=== Early life and education ===
Olds was born in Chicago, Illinois, and grew up in Nyack, New York. His father, Leland Olds, later became chairman of the Federal Power Commission during the 1940s. His grandfather George D. Olds was the ninth president of Amherst College.

Olds attended college at a number of schools including St. John's College, Annapolis, and the University of Wisconsin but received his undergraduate B.A. from Amherst College in 1947. His undergraduate years were interrupted by military service with the U.S. Army during World War 2 as part of the Persian Gulf Command. After the war, Olds obtained a Ph.D. at Harvard University in the Department of Social Relations supervised by Professor Richard L. Solomon. His thesis concerned motivation and resulted in his subsequent interest in the biological basis of motivation.

Olds married Marianne E. Olds in 1947. They had two children, Jacqueline Olds and James L. Olds.

=== Career ===
After obtaining his Ph.D., Olds did postdoctoral work at McGill University supervised by Donald Olding Hebb, where he made his most important discovery with Peter Milner. Subsequently, Olds relocated to UCLA, where he received his first academic appointment at the Brain Research Institute. In 1957 Olds was appointed associate professor in the Department of Psychology at the University of Michigan. He left Michigan in 1969 to become the Bing Professor of Behavioral Biology at the California Institute of Technology where he continued his research and headed up a large laboratory until his death as a result of a swimming accident in August 1976. His last work concerned research of the mechanisms of learning and memory.

== Bibliography ==
- 1954 Olds, J., and P. Milner. "Positive reinforcement produced by electrical stimulation of septal area and other regions of rat brain." Journal of Comparative and Physiological Psychology 47:419–27.
- 1955 Olds, J. "'Reward' from brain stimulation in the rat." Science 122:878.
- The growth and structure of motives; psychological studies in the theory of action The Free Press (1956)
- 1956 Olds, J. "Runway and maze behavior controlled by basomedial forebrain stimulation in the rat." Journal of Comparative and Physiological Psychology, 49:507–12.
- 1956 Olds, J., K. F. Killiam, and P. Bach-Y-Rita. "Self-stimulation of the brain used as a screening method for tranquilizing drugs." Science 124:265–66.
- 1956 Olds, J. "Pleasure centers in the brain." Scientific American 195: 105–16.
- 1958 Olds, J. "Self-stimulation of the brain." Science 127:315–24.
- 1958 Olds, J., and M. E. Olds. "Positive reinforcement produced by stimulating hypothalamus with iproniazid and other compounds." Science 127:1175–76.
- 1965 "Operant conditioning of single unit responses". Proc. 23rd Congr. Physiological Sciences. Excerpta Med. Int. Congr. Ser. no. 87, pp. 372–80.
- 1967 "The limbic system and behavioural reinforcement." Progress in Brain Research. 27 144–64.
- "The central nervous system and the reinforcement of behaviour". American Psychologist. 24 (1969) 114–32.
- 1969 Olds, J., and Hirano, T.: "Conditioned responses of hippocampal and other neurons." Electroencephalogr. clin. Neurophysiol. 26 159–66.
- 1969 Olds, J., and Best, P. J.: "Single unit patterns during anticipatory behaviour". Electroencephalogr. clin. Neurophysiol. 26 144–58.
- 1972 Olds, J., Disterhoft, J. F., Segal, M., Kornblith, C. L., and Hirsh, R.: "Learning centres of rat brain mapped by measuring latencies of conditioned unit responses". Journal of Neurophysiology. 35 202–19.
- Drives and reinforcements Raven Books ISBN 0-89004-087-7 (1977)
