= Charles B. Curtis =

American lawyer (born 1940)

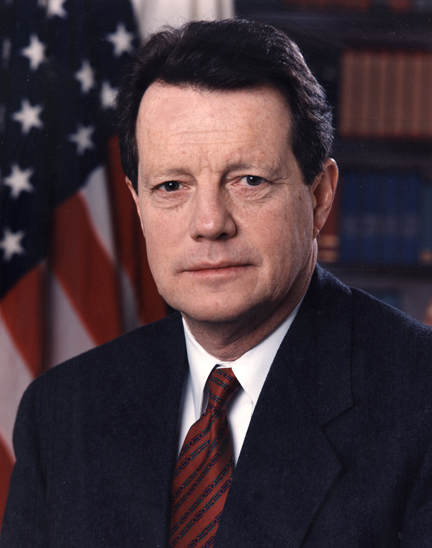

11th United States Deputy Secretary of Energy
- In office August 1995 – May 1997
- President: Bill Clinton
- Preceded by: Bill White
- Succeeded by: Frank Blake

Chair of the Federal Energy Regulatory Commission
- In office October 1, 1977 – January 1, 1981
- President: Jimmy Carter
- Preceded by: Himself (as Chair of the Federal Power Commission)
- Succeeded by: Georgiana Sheldon (acting)

Personal details
- Born: April 27, 1940 (age 86) Upper Darby Township, Pennsylvania, U.S.
- Occupation: Lawyer
- Known for: President Emeritus and Board Member of the Nuclear Threat Initiative

Charles B. Curtis (born April 27, 1940) is an American lawyer, currently Board member of Energy Futures Initiative Foundation, Member of Energy Futures Initiative International Advisory Committee, Board Member Executive Committee, Keep Our Republic Foundation, former senior advisor (nonresident) to the Center for Strategic and International Studies, 2012 through 2024, vice chair of the United States Department of State's International Security Advisory Board, 2011 through 2017, former member of the National Academies Intelligence Science and Technology Experts Group, and President Emeritus of the Nuclear Threat Initiative (NTI), a non-profit organization working to reduce the threats from nuclear, biological and chemical weapons. In addition to working in private practice for more than sixteen years, Curtis served as the last chairman of the Federal Power Commission and the first chairman of the Federal Energy Regulatory Commission from 1977 to 1981. In 1994 he was appointed and confirmed as undersecretary and then deputy secretary of the US Department of Energy. He has held positions on the staff of the U.S. House of Representatives, the U.S. Treasury Department, and the Securities and Exchange Commission.

== Background ==
Curtis was born in Upper Darby Township, Pennsylvania. He graduated from the University of Massachusetts Amherst in 1962 and from Boston University School of Law, with honors, in 1965. At the latter, he served as editor of the Boston University Law School Law Review. He is a recipient of multiple scholarships including Rome Scholarship, American Legion, and VFW Scholarships. He was also a member of the sophomore and senior Men's Honorary Societies at the University of Massachusetts, Amherst. He is married and has one adult son.

== Career ==
From June 1965 to May 1967 he was supervising staff attorney at the Office of the Comptroller of the Currency, U.S. Department of the Treasury. From May 1967 to June 1971 he was special counsel to the Division of Trading and Markets; and Chief of the Branch of Regulation and Inspection of the Securities and Exchange Commission. From 1971 to 1976 he was a professional staff member of the U.S. House of Representatives Committee on Interstate and Foreign Commerce, where he served as lead energy, securities and consumer counsel.

Curtis was a founding partner of the Washington law firm Van Ness, Curtis, Feldman & Sutcliffe, P.C., in 1977 and is a former partner of the international law firm of Hogan & Hartson, 1997 to 2000.

=== Department of Energy ===
Curtis served as the last Chairman of the Federal Power Commission and the first Chairman of the Federal Energy Regulatory Commission from 1977 to January 1981.

During 1997 Curtis served as Acting Secretary of Energy, from January to April having previously served as Under Secretary (From February 1994 to February 1997) and as Deputy Secretary (August 1995 to May 1997) of the U.S. Department of Energy. He was chief operating Officer of the department and, among other duties, had direct programmatic responsibility for all of the department's energy, science, technology and national security programs.

Curtis was instrumental in developing the US/Russian Lab to Lab initiative and in improving U.S.-Russian relations during his tenure at the Department of Energy. He led the development of two key programs that led to major U.S. government efforts working with the Russians to secure their nuclear material, and working with the Russians to secure and repatriate Soviet-origin highly enriched uranium, the easiest material to make a terrorist nuclear device with, scattered around the world in former Soviet republics and client states.

=== United Nations Foundation ===
From January 2000 to January 2001, Curtis served as the Executive Vice President and Chief Operating Officer of the United Nations Foundation.

=== Nuclear Threat Initiative ===
From January 2001 to January 2010, Curtis served as the president and chief operating officer of the Nuclear Threat Initiative, a non-profit organization working to reduce the threats from nuclear, biological and chemical weapons. He is currently the Nuclear Threat Initiative's president emeritus and an emeritus board member. The Nuclear Threat Initiative was founded in 2001 and resulted from Curtis teaming with former Senator Sam Nunn and CNN founder Ted Turner to form a charitable organization focused on issues that were previously the sole domain of governments.

== Memberships ==
Curtis has served on a number of boards, including a number of a corporate boards of directors, the Defense Policy Board of the Department of Defense and the Homeland Security Advisory Council. He is a former member of the Boards of Edison International and Southern California Edison. He served as vice chair of the Defense Department's Threat Reduction Advisory Board and vice chair of the State Department's International Security Advisory Board. Curtis is a former trustee of the Putnam family of Mutual Funds and is currently a member of the Council of Foreign Relations.

== Awards ==
Curtis is a recipient of the Energy Bar Association Lifetime Achievement award, as well as the Chairman's Award from the Securities and Exchange Commission, and a three-time recipient of the Distinguished Service Medal awarded by the U.S. Department of Energy.

He also received Energy Daily's Public Policy Leadership Award for achievements in senior energy and national security policy posts in government and the private sector, and the 2016 Schlsinger Medal for Energy Security. He is a 2018 Public Service Award recipient of the Boston University School of Law.

== See also ==
- Institute of Nuclear Materials Management
- World Institute for Nuclear Security
