= Harris-Fulbright Natural Gas Bill =

The Harris-Fulbright Natural Gas Bill (H.R. 6645) was an unsuccessful 1956 amendment to the Natural Gas Act of 1938 which passed both the House of Representatives and the Senate but was vetoed by President Eisenhower.

During the Senate debate on the Bill, the Republican Senator Francis Case alleged that he had been offered a $2,500 campaign contribution dependent on his support for the Bill and on that basis changed from a supporter to an opponent of the Bill. He was the only Senator to change his vote. It passed through both the Senate and the House.

A select committee investigation was opened into Case's allegations but due to its narrow remit it did not look into other contributions that may have been important in passing the Bill through both houses.

Due to Case's allegations the Bill was vetoed by Eisenhower, despite his support for the general aims.
