= Brain Awareness Week =

Brain Awareness Week is the global campaign to increase public awareness of the progress and benefits of brain research. It unites the efforts of partner organizations from around the world in a week-long celebration of the brain every year in mid-March. It was founded by the Dana Alliance for Brain Initiatives in 1995 and is coordinated by the Dana Foundation. Strategic partners include the Society for Neuroscience, the Federation of European Neuroscience Societies, and the International Brain Research Organization.

Types of events held each year are: lectures, panel discussions, neuroscience lab tours, art exhibitions, brain fairs, and lessons for school students. The Dana foundation offers free materials and event-planning advice on its website.

There is support from leading universities' neuroscience schools, neuroscience publishers, national and student neuroscience societies.

== Sources ==
- Brain Awareness Week. Dana Foundation Official site
- Stephanie Castillo. Brain Awareness Week 2015: How Brain Research Has Progressed, And Ways You Can Enhance Cognition. Medical Daily, Mar 14, 2015 02:02 PM
- Brain Awareness Week at "Neuroscience for Kids" Eric H. Chudler, Ph.D
- Brain Awareness Week at University of California, LA web-site
- Society for Neuroscience - Brain Awareness Week
- Federation of European Neuroscience Societies - Brain Awareness Week
- International Brain Research Organization - Brain Awareness Week
- International Brain Bee
