= Decade of Behavior =

Public education initiative of the 2000s

The Decade of Behavior is the American Psychological Association's nickname for the 2000s. The name represents a public education campaign to bring attention to the importance of behavioral and social research. The initiative has been endorsed by more than 70 professional associations across a variety of disciplines. The campaign was first championed in 1998 by Richard C. McCarty, then-executive director of science of the APA.

It is the successor to the 1990s' "Decade of the Brain".

== Criticisms ==
Since the 1980s, the study of observed or actual behavior has gone down as research in personality and social psychology shifted focus to introspective self reports and to hypothetical behaviors in imagined situations. This is problematic as actual and hypothetical behaviors have been found to differ dramatically.
