= Dana Foundation =

US private philanthropic organization

- Formation: 1950
- Founder: Charles A. Dana
- Type: private philanthropic
- Key people: Steven E. Hyman (chairman); Caroline Montojo (president)

The Dana Foundation (Charles A. Dana Foundation) is a private philanthropic organization based in New York dedicated to advancing neuroscience and society by supporting cross-disciplinary intersections such as neuroscience and ethics, law, policy, humanities, and arts.

== Leadership ==
The foundation was founded in 1950 by Charles A. Dana, a legislator and businessman from New York State, and president of the Dana Corporation. He presided over the organization until 1960, and continued to participate until his death in 1975.

Steven E. Hyman is chairman of the board of directors of the foundation. Caroline Montojo is the current president of the foundation.

== The Dana Alliance for Brain Initiatives ==
The Dana Foundation supported the Dana Alliance for Brain Initiatives (which included the European Dana Alliance for the Brain), a nonprofit organization of leading neuroscientists committed to advancing public awareness about the progress and promise of brain research, from 1993 to 2022.

== Grant programs ==
In 2022, the Dana Foundation pivoted from research grants to grants that advance neuroscience. Current grants fall under three categories.

=== NexGen grants ===
NexGen grants support researchers expanding neuroscience into future generations. Its current major project is creating Dana Centers for Neuroscience & Society.

=== Frontier grants ===
Frontier grants are intended to support informing the public about emerging neuroscience and neurotechnology. Its projects include Judicial Seminars on Emerging Issues in Neuroscience, which seek to provide state and federal judges in the US understanding into the role that neuroscience may play in making legal determinations. The foundation also provides funding for the Royal Society's Neuroscience and the Law program in the UK.

=== Educational grants ===
Educational grants fund advancements and research in neuroscience, such as Brain Awareness Week.

== Past research grant programs ==
The Dana Foundation's area of research emphasis had been in neuroscience, focusing on neuroimaging and clinical neuroscience research. In 2019, the foundation paused awarding new research grants while the board of trustees worked to revise its strategic plan for future neuroscience grants.

Also supported were studies to develop ethical guidelines in brain research and explore other aspects of neuroethics.

== Public education ==
The foundation has a range of outreach initiatives for the general public and for targeted audiences. Major initiatives include:

Brain Awareness Week (BAW) is a global campaign to increase public awareness of the progress and benefits of brain research. Partner organizations host activities in their communities to educate kids and adults about the brain.

Web-based publications include reporting from neuroscience events, scientist Q&As, and Brain Basics.
