= David Robert Williams =

American aerospace and mechanical engineer (1954–2026)

- Born: David Robert Williams; October 2, 1954; Denison, Texas, U.S.
- Died: June 2, 2026 (aged 71)
- Education: Stevens Institute of Technology; Princeton University
- Occupations: Aerospace and mechanical engineer

David Robert Williams (October 2, 1954 – June 2, 2026) was an American aerospace and mechanical engineer. He was a Professor Emeritus, Research Professor, and Professor of Mechanical and Aerospace Engineering at the Illinois Institute of Technology during his 42-year career.

== Early life and education ==
The son of Robert and Sue Williams, David Robert Williams was born in Denison, Texas, in 1954, while his father was in the Air Force. He had one brother, Mark, and spent most of his childhood in Valdosta, Georgia. He built his first sailboat and a soap box derby car as a teenager.

Williams graduated from Stevens Institute of Technology in Hoboken, New Jersey, with a Bachelor of Engineering in Mechanical Engineering in 1976. He completed Master of Science in Fluid Dynamics in 1979 and a Doctor of Philosophy in Fluid Dynamics in 1982, both at Princeton University.

== Career ==
Williams' research involved "unsteady aerodynamics and active flow control for flight vehicle control". He led a research team that "successfully demonstrated the use of active flow control in an aircraft with no tail" in 2021.

Williams used the Fejer Unsteady Flow Wind tunnel to research "unsteady crossflow velocity traveling waves and surging flow disturbances" The wind tunnel had a test section enabling crossflow traveling waves and flow disturbances. Williams used high-speed velocimetry to study the flow field around wings within an atmospheric turbulence spectrum.

Williams also studied "highly-swept delta wing models in the unsteady flow wind tunnel", to study feedback on "active flow control effectors for gust alleviation".

With support of the Illinois NASA Space Grant Consortium, Williams explored a jet-powered model aircraft without a vertical fin. His purpose was "to collect surface pressures in atmospheric turbulence", to evaluate flow control effectors.

Williams died on June 2, 2026, at the age of 71.

== Awards and honors ==
- Fellow of the American Institute of Aeronautics and Astronautics in 2026.
- John W. Rowe Excellence in Teaching Award, Illinois Institute of Technology, 2018
- Excellence in Teaching Award, Armour College of Engineering, 2018
- Fellow of the American Physical Society, cited for contributions to the understanding of fluid flow and flow control through innovative experimentation with cylinder wakes, cavities and bodies of revolution, 2006.
- Illinois Institute of Technology Sigma Xi Award for Excellence in Research, 2006
- Honeywell Advanced Technology Achievement Award, 2006
- IITRI Fellow, 1998
- Stryker Outstanding Student Organization Advisor Award, 1990
- MAE Department Excellence in Teaching Award, 1988
- Alexander von Humboldt Fellow, 1982
- Book Award, Stevens Institute of Technology, 1976
- Guggewnheim Fellowship, Princeton University, 1976
