= Peter Milner =

British-Canadian neuroscientist

- Born: 13 June 1919; Silkstone Common, Barnsley, West Riding of Yorkshire, England
- Died: 2 June 2018 (aged 98); Montréal, Canada
- Scientific career
- Fields: Neuroscience

Peter Milner (13 June 1919 – 2 June 2018) was a British-Canadian neuroscientist and former electrical engineer. He spent most of his career in the Department of Psychology at McGill University in Montreal, where, together with James Olds, he helped establish the study of electrical self-stimulation of the brain and the neural basis of reward.

== Biography ==
Milner was born in Silkstone Common and grew up in Barnsley, South Yorkshire, England. His father was David William Milner, a research chemist, and his mother was Edith Anne Marshall, an ex-schoolteacher.

After graduating in electrical engineering from the University of Leeds in 1941, he joined the United Kingdom's Air Defence Research and Development Establishment, where he worked on radar display systems during the Second World War. In 1944 he moved to Canada to work on nuclear energy research at the Chalk River Laboratories in Ontario.

He was an electrical engineer, but became interested in neuroscience while his wife Brenda Milner was studying the subject at McGill University; he became a graduate student with the same supervisor as her, and later taught at McGill himself. In collaboration with James Olds, he is credited with the discovery of the pleasure centre and the pain centre in the brains of rats.

In his 1974 article "A Model For Visual Shape Recognition" Milner mentions a popular hypothesis suggesting that the features of individual objects are segregated and bound by means of synchronization of the activity of different neurons in the cortex. The theory, termed binding-by-synchrony (BBS), is hypothesized to occur through the transient mutual synchronization of neurons located in different regions of the brain when the stimulus is presented.

Milner received the Gold Medal for Distinguished Lifetime Contributions to Canadian Psychology from the Canadian Psychological Association in 2005.

Milner died on 2 June 2018 at Centre hospitalier de l'Université de Montréal in Montréal.
