= Leland Olds =

American economist (1890–1960)

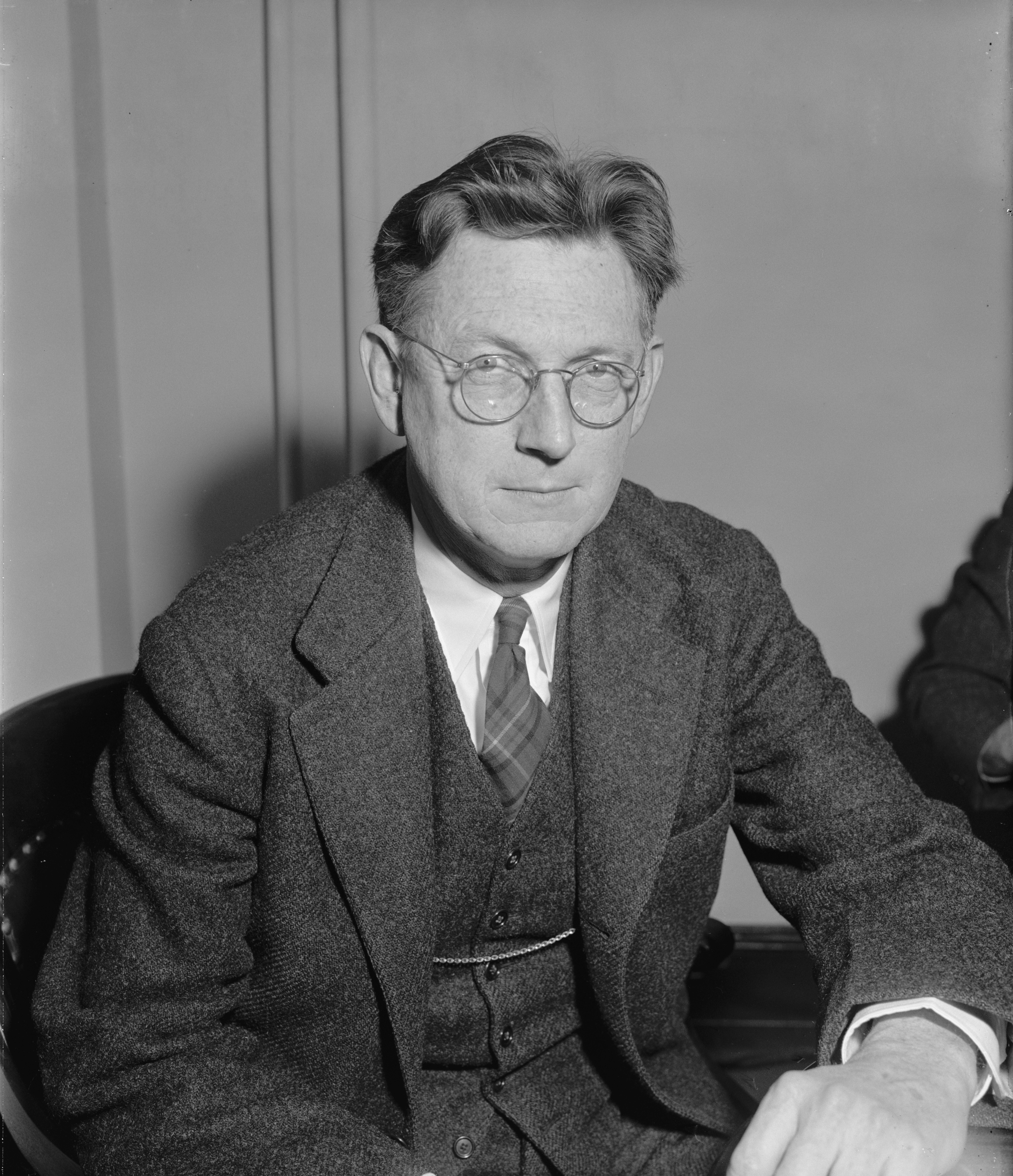
- Olds in 1940

Chairman of the Federal Power Commission
- In office December 14, 1945 – January 1, 1947
- President: Harry S. Truman
- Preceded by: Basil Manly
- Succeeded by: Nelson Lee Smith
- In office January 1, 1940 – June 22, 1944
- President: Franklin D. Roosevelt
- Preceded by: Clyde L. Seavey
- Succeeded by: Basil Manly

Member of the Federal Power Commission
- In office July 7, 1939 – June 22, 1949
- President: Franklin D. Roosevelt

Personal details
- Born: December 31, 1890
- Died: August 5, 1960 (aged 69)

Leland Olds (December 31, 1890 – August 5, 1960) was an American economist interested in labor, development of public electric power, and ecology.

== Education ==
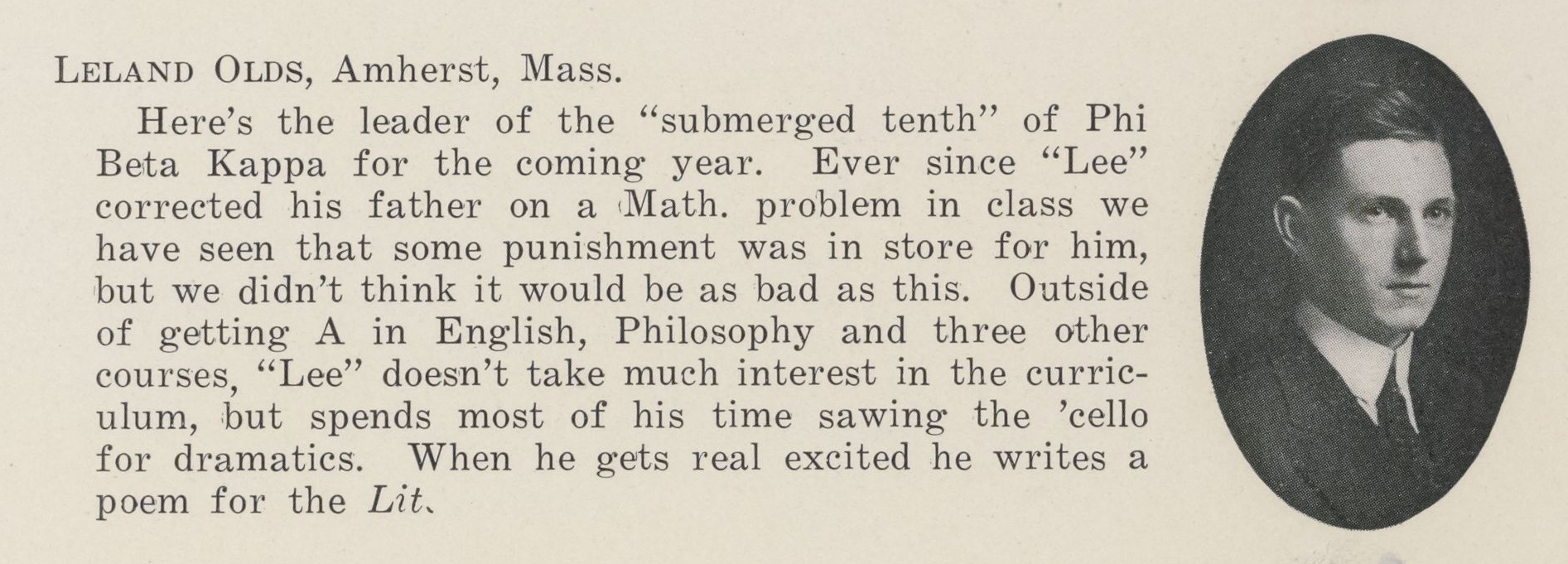
Olds in the Amherst College yearbook, 1912

Olds was a son of George Olds, president of Amherst College. He studied mathematics at Amherst where he was influenced by the ideal of social work and the Social Gospel. He was a graduate student at Union Theological Seminary and then served as pastor of a small Congregational church in Brooklyn before spending some months in the army.

== Early career ==
"Jolly, witty, informal" as well as "very fair-minded" and an accomplished cellist, Olds had been a minister, a teacher at Amherst, a researcher both for the federal government and the American Federation of Labor and a labor journalist. During 1918 and 1919 he was, along with Thorstein Veblen, part of the original Technical Alliance, associated with the philosophy of Technocracy In 1920 he met Franklin D. Roosevelt, Governor of New York, who appointed him to the Power Authority of the State of New York.

From 1922 to 1929 he was Industrial Editor for the union financed leftist news agency Federated Press, which had close links to the Communist Party. He also performed research for the Railroad brotherhoods.

In 1929 he became an economic adviser for the Community Councils of the City of New York, a civic group that among other activities campaigned for the reform of public utility regulation.

In 1936, Olds served on Roosevelt's Presidential Inquiry Commission on Cooperative Enterprise in Europe.

== Philosophy ==
Olds was a devoutly religious and idealistic man, who after a long search for a worthy cause to give purpose to his life, dedicated himself to the politics of establishing public power utilities. He believed that wide availability of cheap electrical power was crucial for the social well-being of the mass of the American people.

He believed in the "complete passing of the old order of capitalism". A complete transformation of the American economic system was needed, which had to end its free-market emphasis and economic individualism. As an alternative, Olds favored consumer cooperation as the basis of a new American economic model. Complementary to his cooperative beliefs, Olds was "very much consumer oriented". Olds believed that, together with regulation and community owned power generation and distribution, consumer cooperation needed for a fair power policy. In 1927, Olds advocated the operating of all hydropower utilities as "giant consumer cooperatives".

Olds's cooperative beliefs had replaced his earlier radicalism. In 1930 and 1931, he served as the "manager" of the American lecture tour of the famed Irish poet and cooperative propagandist Æ (George Russell). AE's charisma persuaded Olds even more of the advantages of organizing all of society as cooperatives.

== Chairman of the Federal Power Commission ==
Roosevelt appointed him to the Federal Power Commission in June 1939, and he served as chairman of the commission from January, 1940 until 1949.

By his management the Federal Power Commission successfully persuaded electric utilities to extend power lines into neglected rural areas and to decrease electricity rates in order to increase use. When the rate reforms became effective in Chicago the dramatic increase of usage actually resulted in an increase in the profits for the now regulated utility. This helped enable the success of the American middle class for the duration of the 20th century.

Although there was some opposition to his renomination in 1944, he served a second term.

However his third term was not approved by the Senate. The relevant subcommittee, chaired by Lyndon Johnson, expressed concerns about both Olds's economic interventionism and his supposed past closeness to the Communist Party due to his writings for the Federated Press and by syndication the Daily Worker. There was strong opposition to his renomination from the oil and gas industry, who persuaded Johnson and other subcommittee members to prevent Olds from serving a third term. The Olds hearings were considered by some as a template for the later McCarthyite purges.

== Later career ==
In 1950 and 1951, Olds served on the President's Water Resources Policy Commission.

He was also instrumental in establishing the Basin Electric Power Cooperative, although this assumed its final form after his death.

== Personal life ==
Olds was married to textile artist Ruth Reeves from 1916 to 1922. His second wife was Maud Agnes Spear, with whom he had four children, including James Olds.

== Legacy ==
When he died in 1960, John F Kennedy, then a presidential candidate, termed him a "dedicated and tireless public servant" saying that the St. Lawrence Waterway would be "a permanent memorial to him".

His concept of "Giant Power" resulted in the creation of the Basin Electric Power Cooperative. In 1961, the new cooperative named the Leland Olds Station after him.
