= Federal Power Commission =

US government body (1930–1977)

Agency overview
- Formed: June 23, 1930; 96 years ago
- Dissolved: October 1, 1977; 48 years ago
- Superseding agency: FERC
- Jurisdiction: U.S. government
- Agency executive: Charles B. Curtis, Chairman (last)

The Federal Power Commission (FPC) was an independent commission of the United States government, originally organized on June 23, 1930, with five members nominated by the president and confirmed by the Senate. The FPC was originally created in 1920 by the Federal Water Power Act, which provided for the licensing by the FPC of hydroelectric projects on the land or navigable water owned by the federal government. The FPC has since been replaced by the Federal Energy Regulatory Commission.

The FPC also regulated interstate electric utilities and the natural gas industry.

In June 1939, President Roosevelt appointed Leland Olds to the FPC, who served as chairman from January 1940 until 1949. Under Olds’ leadership, the FPC successfully pressured electric utilities to extend power into neglected rural areas and to lower electricity rates to increase use. However his reappointment in 1949 failed in the Senate due to concerns about his suspected previous sympathy to communism.

James G. Watt was another prominent FPC commissioner, who conducted prayer meetings prior to the FPC sessions.

== Office of Chairman ==
From its founding in 1920 until its first reform in 1930, the FPC did not have its own commissioners; rather, it was chaired ex officio by the secretaries of war, interior, and agriculture. The first "chairman" in that sense was Woodrow Wilson's secretary of war, Newton D. Baker. Before 1930, five secretaries of war, five secretaries of the interior, and five secretaries of agriculture held title at the FPC.

Following the 1930 reforms, FPC had its own commissioners, with the following commissioners holding the title of Chairman of the Federal Power Commission:

== Chairmen ==
- George Otis Smith December 22, 1930 - July 18, 1933
- Frank R. McNinch July 19, 1933 - September 30, 1937
- Clyde L. Seavey September 30, 1937 - December 31, 1939
- Leland Olds January 1, 1940 - June 22, 1944
- Basil Manly September 21, 1944 - September 14, 1945
- Leland Olds December 14, 1945 - January 1, 1947
- Nelson Lee Smith January 1, 1947 - May 24, 1950
- Mon C. Wallgren May 24, 1950 - October 1, 1951
- Thomas C. Buchanan January 5, 1952 - May 15, 1953
- Jerome K. Kuykendall May 15, 1953 - August 31, 1961
- Joseph C. Swidler September 1, 1961 - December 30, 1965
- Lee C. White March 2, 1966 - July 31, 1969
- John N. Nassikas August 1, 1969 - June 22, 1975
- Richard L. Dunham October 20, 1975 - August 9, 1977
- Charles B. Curtis August 10, 1977 - September 30, 1977 (through renaming to FERC)

== Commissioners ==
- James G. Watt November 11, 1975 - August 30, 1977
- Richard L. Dunham October 20, 1975 - August 9, 1977
- John H. Holloman September 3, 1975 - August 4, 1977
- Don S. Smith December 13, 1973 - June 30, 1979
- William L. Springer June 14, 1973 - December 1, 1975
- Rush Moody Jr. November 19, 1971 - March 15, 1975
- Pinkney Walker May 26, 1971 - December 31, 1972
- John N. Nassikas August 1, 1969 - October 20, 1975
- Albert Buch Brooke Jr. October 16, 1968 - March 31, 1975
- John A. Carver Jr. September 13, 1966 - June 15, 1972
- Lee C. White March 2, 1966 - July 31, 1969
- Carl E. Bagge May 27, 1965 - December 31, 1970
- David S. Black August 30, 1963 - September 13, 1966
- Harold C. Woodward March 30, 1962 - August 4, 1964
- Charles R. Ross September 29, 1961 - September 25, 1968
- Lawrence J. O’Connor Jr. August 14, 1961 - August 30, 1971
- Joseph C. Swidler June 28, 1961 - December 30, 1965
- Howard Morgan June 28, 1961 - June 22, 1963
- Paul A. Sweeney July 15, 1960 - April 15, 1961
- John B. Hussey June 23, 1958 - March 17, 1960
- Arthur Kline June 23, 1956 - August 13, 1961
- Wiliam R. Connole June 23, 1955 - June 22, 1958
- Fredrick Stueck July 9, 1954 - July 15, 1961
- Seaborn L. Digby August 17, 1953 - June 22, 1958
- Jerome K. Kuykendall May 15, 1953 - August 31, 1961
- Dale E. Doty May 22, 1952 - June 22, 1954
- Mon C. Wallgren November 2, 1949 - October 1, 1951
- Thomas C. Buchanan June 14, 1948 - May 15, 1953
- Richard Sachse November 1, 1945 - June 22, 1947
- Harrington Wimberly October 5, 1945 - June 22, 1958
- Nelson Lee Smith October 26, 1943 - June 22, 1956
- Leland Olds July 7, 1939 - June 22, 1944
- John W. Scott June 24, 1937 - June 15, 1945
- Clyde L. Seavey August 13, 1934 - August 5, 1943
- Basil Manly June 24, 1933 - October 1, 1945
- Herbert J. Drane June 16, 1933 - June 22, 1937
- Ralph B. Williamson December 31, 1930 - December 10, 1932
- Frank R. McNinch December 27, 1930 - June 22, 1934
- George Otis Smith December 22, 1930 - October 31, 1933
- Claude L. Draper December 22, 1930 - June 22, 1956
- Marcell Garsaud December 22, 1930 - June 22, 1932

== Relevant laws ==
- 46 Stat. 797
- 41 Stat. 1063
- 16 United States Code 791-823, the Federal Water Power Act

== Dissolution ==
On October 1, 1977, the FPC was replaced by the Federal Energy Regulatory Commission.

== See also ==
- Scenic Hudson Preservation Conference v. Federal Power Commission
