= Remarks at Amherst College on the Arts =

1963 speech by U.S. President John F. Kennedy

The Remarks at Amherst College on the Arts at the Presidential Convocation and Groundbreaking for the Robert Frost Library is a speech delivered by United States President John F. Kennedy about the arts and liberal education in honor of the American poet Robert Frost to the students and faculty of Amherst College, a liberal arts college in Amherst, Massachusetts, on October 26, 1963. Kennedy was assassinated 27 days after delivering the speech. The speech marked the dedication of the Robert Frost Memorial Library at Amherst College, Frost had died in January 1963.

== Background ==
Kennedy and his military escorts arrived at Amherst's Memorial Field in three helicopters at 11:30 am. Kennedy and the poet Archibald MacLeish were awarded honorary Doctor of Law degrees by Plimpton at the convocation ceremony. Kennedy and MacLeish both gave speeches. at the ceremony. Following the ceremony Kennedy rode to the groundbreaking event for the new Robert Frost Memorial Library in an open-topped motorcade with the President of Amherst College, Calvin Plimpton.

MacLeish said in his speech that "The people of this countryside may forget in ordinary human course what anyone says on this occasion, but they will remember, for many, many years that a young and gallant President of the United States, with the weight of history heavy upon his shoulders, somehow found time to come to our small corner of the world to talk of books and men and learning".

Supporters of Kennedy's position on civil rights held a silent vigil in front of the Kirby Theatre.

The event attracted wide media coverage. 130 members of the media were in attendance with 40 members of the White House Press staff and 70 technicians.

A documentary film, JFK: The Last Speech, was made in 2018 about the speech and Kennedy's visit to Amherst.

== The speech ==
Kennedy's speech was 15 minutes in length.

The JFK Library wrote that Kennedy spoke of the "role of the artist in society" the "nature of strength and power" and the "importance of public service from educated citizens". Kennedy spoke of Robert Frost's life in American poetry and his contributions to American culture.

Kennedy said that "When power leads men towards arrogance, poetry reminds him of his limitations. When power narrows the areas of man's concern, poetry reminds him of the richness and diversity of existence. When power corrupts, poetry cleanses".
