= Christopher O. Ward =

American civil servant (born 1954)

Christopher Owen Ward

Executive director of the Port Authority of New York and New Jersey
- In office May 1, 2008 – November 1, 2011
- Nominated by: David Paterson
- Governor: David Paterson; Andrew Cuomo; Jon S. Corzine; Chris Christie
- Preceded by: Anthony Shorris
- Succeeded by: Patrick J. Foye

Commissioner of the New York City Department of Environmental Protection
- In office January 1, 2002 – January 1, 2005
- Appointed by: Michael Bloomberg
- Preceded by: Joel Miele
- Succeeded by: Emily Lloyd

Personal details
- Born: October 11, 1954 (age 71) Princeton, New Jersey, U.S.
- Party: Democratic
- Spouse: Pamela A. Cook (m. 1984)
- Children: 2
- Parent(s): Barbara Carnes; John William Ward
- Relatives: David C. Ward
- Education: Macalester College (B.A.); Harvard Divinity School (M.T.S.)

Christopher Owen Ward (born 1954) is an American civil servant who served as executive director of the Port Authority of New York and New Jersey from 2008 to 2011 and as New York City Department of Environmental Protection commissioner from 2002 to 2005.

== Early life ==
Ward was born in Princeton, New Jersey on October 11, 1954, the son of Barbara Carnes and academic John William Ward. John was chair of the Special Program in American Civilization at Princeton University, and later served as president of Amherst College from 1971–1979, during which time it became mixed-sex. John also ran the Ward Commission to investigate political corruption in construction contracts in Massachusetts, a position to which he was appointed by Michael Dukakis.

Ward graduated from Amherst Regional High School. He attended Macalester College in Saint Paul, Minnesota, earning a Bachelor of Arts in 1976. Ward worked as a mechanic on an oil rig in the Gulf of Mexico for Pennzoil before attending Harvard Divinity School, where he received a Master of Theological Studies. His elder brother is David C. Ward. He married Pamela A. Cook in 1984. They have two children, Katherine and John.

== New York City official ==
During the Ed Koch administration, Ward worked at the New York City Department of Consumer Affairs as director of research from 1982 to 1988. From 1988 to 1992, he was an assistant commissioner for the New York City Department of Telecommunications and Energy.

During the David Dinkins administration, Ward worked on the city's negotiations with Consolidated Edison and Hydro-Québec regarding the expansion of the hydropower system in Northern Canada. He also worked as senior vice president for transportation and commerce at the New York City Economic Development Corporation (NYCEDC) from 1992 to 1995. During his tenure at the NYCEDC, Ward worked on acquiring the Staten Island Railway to re-establish rail freight service to the Howland Hook Marine Terminal.

During the Michael Bloomberg administration, Ward served as commissioner of the New York City Department of Environmental Protection from 2002 to 2005. As commissioner, he worked on the Long Island Sound Nitrogen Reduction Program, federal approval of the Filtration Avoidance Agreement for the Protection and Water Quality of the Upstate Reservoir System, and the funding and completion of the Manhattan segment of the third water tunnel.

== Private sector ==
Ward was director of Business Development of American Stevedoring, a shipping company based in Red Hook, Brooklyn, from 1996 to 1997. Ward returned to the private sector, as CEO of the same company, from 2005 to 2006. Ward then moved on to work as the managing director of the General Contractors Association of New York.

Ward's work since his return to the private sector in 2011 has been focused on expanding MWBE (Minority and Women Owned Business Enterprises Program) business and continuing to improve New York City environmental infrastructure. He served as chair of the Waterfront Alliance from 2016 to 2024. In the role of chairman of the Waterfront Alliance, Ward advocated for a more accessible New York–New Jersey Harbor Estuary as well as a long term resilience strategy in the face of climate change. Ward is also on the board of the Franklin D. Roosevelt Four Freedoms Park.

== Port Authority of New York and New Jersey ==
Ward was chief external affairs and director of port development for the Port Authority of New York and New Jersey from 1997 to 2002, under Executive Directors Robert E. Boyle and Neil David Levin. Ward oversaw the development of the comprehensive port development plan and the 50 foot channeling project throughout the Port of New York and New Jersey. In addition, Ward also oversaw the approval of the longstanding AirTrain to John F. Kennedy International Airport (JFK). Ward is a survivor of the 9/11 attack.

When David Paterson became governor, he recommended Ward to become executive director of the Port Authority. Ward was appointed to the position on May 1, 2008. Ward served under both Paterson and Governor Andrew Cuomo. He resigned from the job in November 2011, and was followed by Pat Foye.

While executive director of the Port Authority, Ward oversaw the planned expansion of Pennsylvania Station to the James A. Farley Building, known as the Moynihan Train Hall upon its opening in 2021. In July 2008, Ward announced that construction at the World Trade Center site would run longer and cost significantly more than previously promised. The National September 11 Memorial & Museum was nevertheless ready for the 10th anniversary of the attacks. Ward announced the pending demolition and renovation of LaGuardia Airport's Central Terminal, the replacement of Terminal 3 at JFK, and the long-term lease commitment by Mediterranean Shipping Company at Elizabeth Marine Terminal. Ward also advocated for the commuter rail project Access to the Region's Core in order to expand mass transit capacity across New York and New Jersey. New Jersey Governor Chris Christie nixed the project, delaying any opportunity to build a new tunnel across the Hudson River.

| Preceded by Joel Miele | Commissioner of the Department of Environmental Protection; January 2002 – 2005 | Succeeded by Emily Lloyd |

| Preceded by Anthony Shorris | Executive director of the Port Authority of New York and New Jersey; May 2008 – 2011 | Succeeded by Patrick J. Foye |
