= G. Armour Craig =

Professor of English

George Armour Craig (November 15, 1914 – January 29, 2002) was a long-time professor of English and, at the end of his career, the acting president of Amherst College.

== Life ==
Craig was born on November 15, 1914, in Cleveland, Ohio, where he attended the Hawken School. A member of the Alpha Delta Phi fraternity, he graduated Phi Beta Kappa from Amherst College in 1937, and subsequently studied English at Harvard University receiving an M.A. in 1938 and a Ph.D. in 1947. Craig married Margaret Ball, who died in 1996, and the couple had two children, daughter Sara Margaret Ballantine and son James Ball Craig.

He died at 87 on Tuesday, January 29, 2002, after a long illness in Hanover, New Hampshire, where he had retired.

== Career ==
Craig taught in the English Department at Amherst from 1940 to 1985. In 1983, after the untimely death of President Julian H. Gibbs, he became acting president for 15 months. During this time, he oversaw the abolition of campus fraternities, following a white paper of a few years earlier that had made the recommendation.

Craig's areas of specialty were 17th- and 19th-century English literature. Along with the late Theodore Baird, Craig was instrumental in promoting and sustaining the famous required freshman composition course at Amherst. One of six teachers honored at the White House in 1980, his former student, the poet Richard Wilbur (Amherst College 1942), said Craig had taught him “not only to be fiercely attentive to texts, but also to watch what we said and wrote.... Armour Craig was forever asking the embarrassing question, ‘What do you mean?’”

Academic offices
Preceded by Julian Gibbs	President of Amherst College; 1983–1984	Succeeded by Peter R. Pouncey
