= Arthur Pease =

Arthur Pease may refer to:

- Arthur Pease (MP) (1837–1898), British coal owner and politician
- Sir Arthur Pease, 1st Baronet (1866–1927), his son, British coal owner and businessman
- Arthur Stanley Pease (1881–1964), American classicist and amateur botanist
