= Stanley King =

American academic (1883–1951)

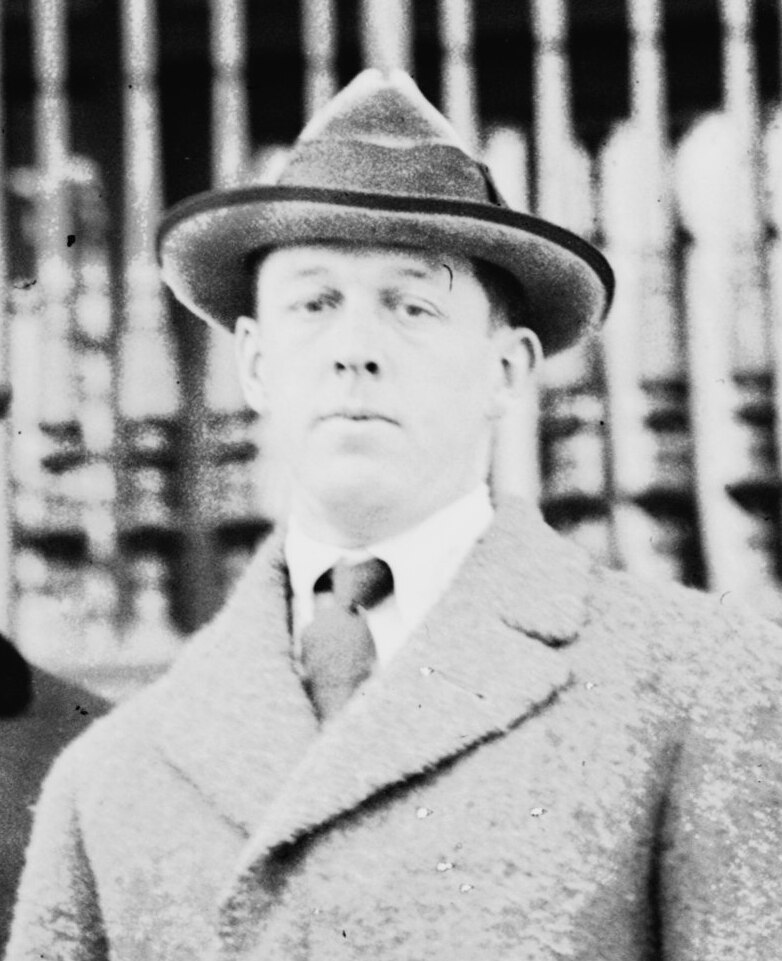
Photo of King in 1919

Stanley King (May 11, 1883 – April 28, 1951) was the eleventh president of Amherst College. He held that position from 1932 to 1946.

== Biography ==
=== Early life ===
Stanley King was born in Troy, Rensselaer County, New York, on May 11, 1883, the son of Judge Henry Amasa King (Amherst College, 1873 and Columbia Law School, 1877) a justice of Superior Court of Massachusetts and Maria Lyon Flynt. He died on April 28, 1951, at his summer home on Chilmark, Martha's Vineyard, Dukes County, Massachusetts. His body was cremated and remains scattered at Forest Hills Cemetery in Jamaica Plain, Massachusetts. A memorial to King is located at Wildwood Cemetery in Amherst, Massachusetts. He was the grandson of Dwight King and Martha Vinton and William N. Flynt and Eudocia Carter Converse. He had two siblings. A sister, Carrie, born on March 15, 1885, was a graduate of Miss Porter's School in 1904. She died on December 25, 1921. Ames King, Stanley's brother, was born on June 10, 1892, and lived for only a few days.

=== Education ===
King graduated from Springfield High School in Springfield, Massachusetts. He entered Amherst College in 1900 graduating summa cum laude and Phi Beta Kappa in 1903. He was a brother of the Delta Kappa Epsilon fraternity (Sigma chapter) at Amherst. He graduated from Harvard Law School (completing the course in the abnormally short space of two years), and was admitted to the Massachusetts Bar in 1906.

=== Marriage and family ===
He married on December 12, 1906, at Springfield, Massachusetts, Gertrude Louisa Besse, the daughter of Lyman Waterman Besse and Henrietta Louisa Segee. She was born on 22 Apr 1881 at Bridgeport, Connecticut, and died on April 10, 1923, at Boston, Massachusetts. She was a 1903 graduate of Vassar College in Poughkeepsie, New York and received her Master of Arts Degree from Radcliffe College in 1910. Her father, Lyman Waterman Besse, owned an extensive chain of clothing stores in the Northeast known as "The Besse System."

Stanley and Gertrude were the parents of three children: Richard King (1913–1994), Amherst College Class of 1935; Harvard Law School 1935–1936. He married as his first wife, Elinor Stewart Gates, the granddaughter of Frederick Taylor Gates; He married his second wife Alice Gillette Epps Hotchkiss. She had 2 sons from her previous marriage. She survived him. Gertrude King (1916–1969), Vassar College class of 1938, married Roger Wolcott Toll Jr., son of mountaineer and former Yellowstone National Park superintendent Roger Wolcott Toll, June 25, 1952. They had two children. They divorced Feb 22, 1962. and Margaret King (1917–1923).

After his first wife Gertrude's death, Stanley married in 1927 Mrs. Margaret Pinckney Jackson-Allen, who married as her first husband, Arthur Moulton Allen of Providence, Rhode Island. She died in 1967.

Gertrude Louisa Besse's sister, Florence Foster Besse, a 1907 Phi Beta Kappa graduate of Wellesley College married Kingman Brewster Sr., a 1906 Phi Beta Kappa graduate of Amherst College and a 1911 graduate of the Harvard Law School. He was a direct lineal descendant of Elder William Brewster (pilgrim), (c. 1567 – April 10, 1644), the Pilgrim colonist leader and spiritual elder of the Plymouth Colony and a passenger on the Mayflower. They were the parents of Kingman Brewster, Jr., (June 17, 1919 – November 8, 1988) an educator, president of Yale University, and American diplomat.

=== Career ===
After graduating from Harvard Law School, he was employed as secretary and a director of the W. H. McElwain Co., a shoe manufacturer in Boston, Massachusetts; he was made vice-president of the company in 1919.

He was a member of the Committee on Supplies on the Council of National Defense in 1917. He was a special assistant to Secretary of War, Newton Diehl Baker, Jr. in 1917. He was elected Director of the Boston Chamber of Commerce, serving for 2 years. In 1919 he became secretary of President Woodrow Wilson's Industrial Conference Board working directly with Herbert Hoover and Owen D. Young. He was elected a trustee of Amherst College in 1922.

From 1922 to 1927 he was Eastern Manager and Director of the International Shoe Company, Boston. In 1927 he retired from business. In 1932, after traveling extensively for several years, King was appointed the 11th President of Amherst College – the first in the institution's history to have been neither a minister nor educator.

=== Amherst years ===
The following said about Stanley King after being appointed president: Said Newton D. Baker: "Stanley King's love of life, his knowledge of youth, his happiness and integrity are all qualities which will make him a great example as a college president. . . . The highest qualification for a college presidency is that the students should desire to be like the president. I can imagine few people whom it would be more wholesome to be like than him."

Said President Ernest Martin Hopkins of Amherst's rival, Dartmouth College: "My respect has continued and grown for the scope of his intellectual interest and for the quality of his thinking in regard to political and social problems."

As President of Amherst, King was instrumental in developing the Folger Shakespeare Library in Washington, D.C., into one of the most important libraries of its kind. He also took a great interest in the buildings and grounds of the Amherst campus: the College recovered from the destruction caused by a major hurricane in 1938 by the introduction of new landscaping and the unprecedented construction of new buildings.

Under King's administration the campus saw the addition of such buildings as Alumni Gymnasium, Valentine Hall, Memorial Field, Kirby Theatre, James and Stearns dormitories, and the Mead Art Building. These new buildings reflected King's vision of the dimensions of education and college life. In fact his vision encompassed the establishment of a school to address the educational needs of the children of the Faculty; he solicited a benefaction from his friend and Amherst graduate, James Turner (Class of 1880), for the construction of The Little Red Schoolhouse . In the 1930s, President King led the College through the crisis of the Great Depression by achieving financial solutions that enabled Amherst to avoid annual deficits or reductions in salary. The disruptions of World War II, 1941–1945, were handled with similar effectiveness with a long-range focus on developing a "New Curriculum" for the College to meet modern post-war needs.

After retiring as President in 1946, he was President Emeritus until his death in 1951. The Archives and Special Collections at Amherst College holds his papers.

=== Selected works ===
- Recollections of the Folger Shakespeare Library (1950);
- A History of the Endowment of Amherst College (1950);
- The Consecrated Eminence: The Story of the Campus and Buildings of Amherst College (1952).

== See also ==
- John William Ward

Academic offices
Preceded by Arthur Stanley Pease	President of Amherst College; 1932–1946	Succeeded by Charles W. Cole
