= Charles W. Cole =

American diplomat and academic

United States Ambassador to Chile
- In office October 21, 1961 – September 27, 1964
- President: John F. Kennedy; Lyndon B. Johnson
- Preceded by: Robert F. Woodward
- Succeeded by: Ralph A. Dungan

12th President of Amherst College
- In office 1946–1960
- Preceded by: Stanley King
- Succeeded by: Calvin Plimpton

Personal details
- Born: Charles Woolsey Cole; February 8, 1906 Montclair, New Jersey, US
- Died: February 20, 1978 (aged 72) at sea
- Education: Amherst College, B.A. 1927; Columbia University, M.A. 1928 and Ph.D.1931
- Nickname: Charlie

Charles Woolsey Cole (February 8, 1906 – February 20, 1978) was an American diplomat and academic. He was the United States Ambassador to Chile and the president of Amherst College.

== Early life ==
"Charlie" Cole was born February 8, 1906 in Montclair, New Jersey. He graduated from Montclair High School.

He attended Amherst College, graduating summa cum laude and Phi Beta Kappa in 1927. While there, he was a brother of the Delta Kappa Epsilon fraternity and Delta Sigma Rho

Cole received an M.A. from Columbia University in 1928. He received a Ph.D. from Columbia University in 1931. His scholarly interest were the 17th‐century France and mercantilism, especially foreign trade under Louis XIV.

== Career ==
Cole taught at Columbia University from 1928 to 1934. He was a Social Science Research Council fellow for year. He published French Mercantilist Doctrines Before Colbert in 1931.

Cole became professor of economics at Amherst College in 1935. He published Colbert and a Century of French Mercantilism in 1939. He became a history professor at Columbia University in 1940 to 1945. He also taught military government for the United States Navy. During World War II, Cole worked for the Office of Price Administration in Washington, D.C. for one year and was a regional price executive in New York City for two years.

Cole was the twelfth president of Amherst College from 1946 to 1960. He grew the college's endowment from $16 million to $42 million. He implemented a program requiring freshmen and sophomores to follow a "core curriculum" of English, European civilization, foreign language, and science, rather than electives. This curriculum was in use at Amherst from 1948 to 1966.

Cole retired from Amherst in 1960. In 1961, President John F. Kennedy appointed Cole to be United States Ambassador to Chile. He served as Ambassador Extraordinary and Plenipotentiary (Chile) from October 21, 1961 to September 27, 1964.

Cole was elected to the American Academy of Arts and Sciences in 1948. He was a member of the American Association of University Professors, the American Historical Association, the American Economic Association, and the Council on Foreign Relations. He served on the boards of the Committee on the National Security Organization, Educational Testing Service, the Merrill Foundation for the Advancement of Financial Knowledge, and the Teachers Insurance and Annuity Association.

== Personal life ==
Cole married Katharine Bush Salmon, a writer who attended Smith College. They had two daughters, Katharine and Elizabeth. Katherine died in 1972. He married Marie Greer Donahue in 1974.

He was vice president of the Rockefeller Foundation and served on the board of the American Cancer Society, and Wilton Academy.

Cole died from a heart attack on February 20, 1978, while on a cruise ship off Los Angeles, California. He was buried in Wildwood Cemetery in Amherst, Massachusetts.

== Selected publications ==
=== Books ===
- Cole, Charles Woolsey . French Mercantalist Doctrines Before Colbert. New York: Richard R. Smith, Inc., 1931
- Cole, Charles Woolsey. Colbert And A Century of French Mercantilism. New York: Columbia University Press, 1939.
- Clough, Shepard Bancroft and Cole, Charles Woolsey. Economic History of Europe. Boston: D.C. Heath and Company, 1941.
- Cole, Charles Woolsey. French Mercantalism 1683-1700. New York: Columbia University Press, 1943.
- Hayes, Carlton J. H. and Baldwin, Marshall Whithed and Cole, Charles Woolsey. History of Europe. New York: The MacMillan Company, 1949.

=== Journals ===
- Cole, Charles Woolsey. “The Relativity of History.” Political Science Quarterly, vol. 48, no. 2 (1933): 161–71. doi.org/10.2307/2143343.

== See also ==
- John William Ward

Diplomatic posts
Preceded by Robert F. Woodward	United States Ambassador to Chile; October 21, 1961 – September 27, 1964	Succeeded by Ralph A. Dungan
Academic offices
Preceded by Stanley King	President of Amherst College; 1946–1960	Succeeded by Calvin Plimpton
