= Pouncey =

Pouncey is a surname. Notable people with the surname include:

- Maurkice Pouncey (born 1989), American football player
- Mike Pouncey (born 1989), American football player, twin brother of Maurkice
- Peter Pouncey (born 1937), British author, classicist, and university president
