= Little Red Schoolhouse (Amherst, Massachusetts) =

Schoolhouse on the campus of Amherst College

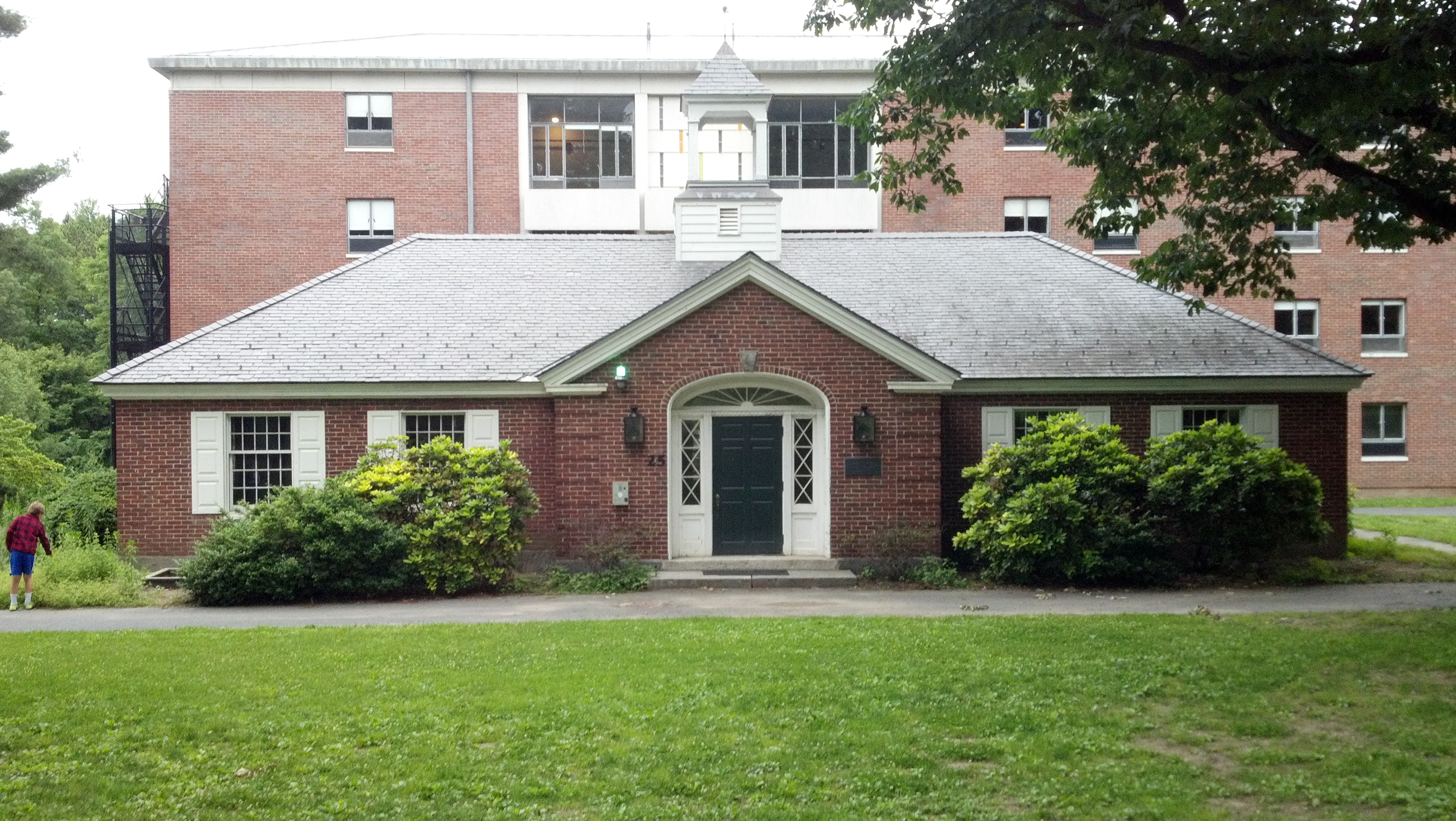
- The Little Red Schoolhouse, 2015.

- Location within Massachusetts
- Former names: Amherst Day School

General information
- Location: 25 East Drive; Amherst, Massachusetts, USA
- Coordinates: 42°22′20.262″N 72°31′10.7826″W
- Completed: 1937
- Demolished: 2016

Design and construction
- Architect: James Kellum Smith
- Other designers: McKim, Mead and White

The Little Red Schoolhouse, also known as Amherst Day School, was a historic schoolhouse on the campus of Amherst College in Amherst, Massachusetts. Designed by the noted academic architect James Kellum Smith of the firm McKim, Mead and White, the building was completed in 1937. The Georgian Revival-style schoolhouse is of brick, steel and concrete construction, and was built from the ground up to serve preschool children. Features include built-in wood cubbies in the hallway for storing coats and belongings, toddler-sized bench seats around the periphery of the main meeting room, and windows placed at a low height so that children can look out. Referring to the schoolhouse in a 1951 publication, former Amherst College President Stanley King wrote, "No building on the Amherst campus is better built."

Little Red Schoolhouse developed into a children's education resource serving both college faculty and parents from the greater Amherst community.

In 2011, Amherst College announced plans to close Little Red Schoolhouse in order to make way for a major campus construction project. The preschool program was terminated in May 2013, and the building was demolished in May 2016.

== History ==
In July 1936, Dr. Stanley King, President of Amherst College, was presented a petition advocating for a permanent campus building to serve as a preschool. Originally proposed as a resource for college faculty families, the Little Red School House was eventually built to serve children of both the Amherst College faculty and the community at large. It is believed to be the oldest preschool in Amherst.

The Little Red School House building was designed by the American architectural firm McKim, Mead and White. James Kellum Smith, last partner to McKim, Mead and White and Amherst College graduate, class of 1915, designed the schoolhouse. Smith also designed the National Museum of American History in Washington, DC, the Mead Art Building, and the Amherst College War Memorial overlooking Memorial Field. Other buildings designed by McKim, Mead and White include Penn Station, the Boston Public Library and the Rhode Island Statehouse.

The building was underwritten by James Turner, Amherst College class of 1880, who instructed that the schoolhouse be built of "the best materials on the market regardless of any budget." Architect Smith prepared plans based on a conceptual sketch drawn by Amherst President Stanley King's wife, Gertrude King. The building was completed in 1937 at a cost of $36,000.

James Turner died in 1940, at which time his brother William and sister Isabel gave $10,000 each as an endowment for work carried on at the Little Red Schoolhouse.

Over the course of seventy-five years the school is estimated to have educated more than 1700 preschoolers. In addition to serving children, the Little Red Schoolhouse has also functioned as an intern program for Amherst College with nine to ten Amherst College student volunteers working in the school each semester.

In 2011, Amherst College announced plans to close Little Red Schoolhouse in order to make way for construction of a new science center. The preschool administration was instructed to terminate its program by June 2012, but in response to vigorous public appeal, Amherst College granted the school a one-year reprieve.

In April 2015 Amherst College applied to the Town of Amherst for a permit to demolish the Little Red Schoolhouse. Citing its status as possibly the first building to be designed exclusively for use by preschool classes, the Amherst Historical Commission on May 19, 2015, unanimously imposed a one-year delay on Amherst College's request to demolish the Little Red Schoolhouse.

A citizen's group, the Little Red Schoolhouse Preservation Committee, embarked on an unsuccessful effort to save the building by procuring a new location and raising funds to have the Little Red Schoolhouse moved. The building was razed over the course of 3 days, beginning May 25, 2016.
