= George Olds =

George Daniel Olds
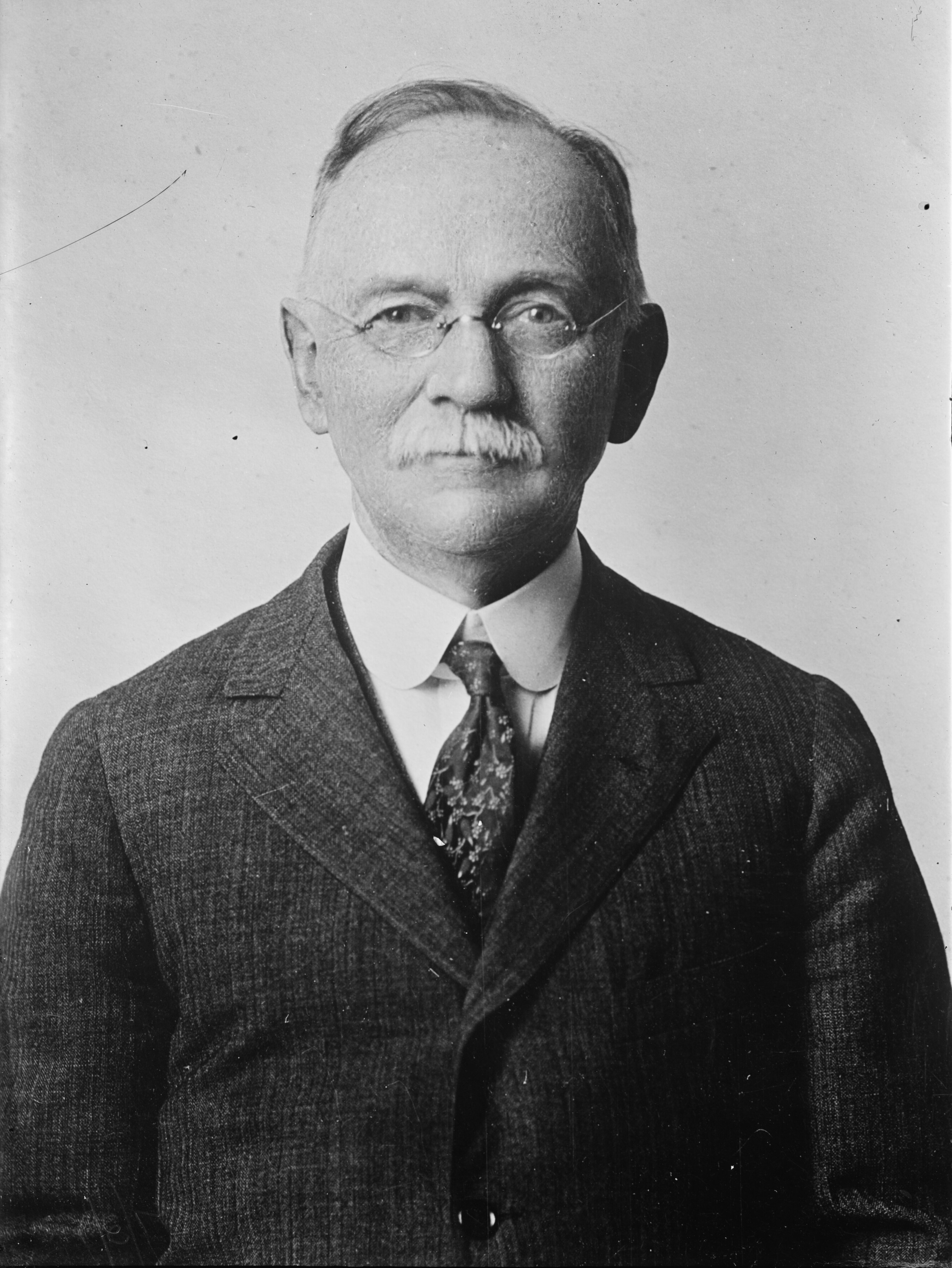
- George Olds

9th President of Amherst College
- In office 1924–1927
- Preceded by: Alexander Meiklejohn
- Succeeded by: Arthur Stanley Pease

Personal details
- Born: October 14, 1853
- Died: May 10, 1931 (aged 77)
- Citizenship: United States
- Education: University of Rochester

George Daniel Olds (October 14, 1853 – May 10, 1931) was a mathematician who served a term as the President of Amherst College.

Olds was born in Middleport, New York and received his A.B. (1873) and A.M. (1876) from the University of Rochester. He was professor of mathematics at the University of Rochester (1884–1891) and Amherst College (1891–1927). He served as Dean of the College from 1909 to 1922 and President of Amherst College from 1924 to 1927, succeeding Alexander Meiklejohn. Among his students was Calvin Coolidge.

Olds is the father of Leland Olds, an American economist and former chairman of the U.S. Federal Power Commission.

Academic offices
Preceded by Alexander Meiklejohn	President of Amherst College; 1924–1927	Succeeded by Arthur Stanley Pease
