= David C. Ward =

American academic

Senior historian at National Portrait Gallery
- In office 2012–2017

Personal details
- Born: April 12, 1952 (age 74)
- Parent: John William Ward
- Relatives: Christopher O. Ward
- Education: University of Rochester BA; Warwick University MA; Yale University MA
- Known for: Hide Seek; Charles Willson Peale

David C. Ward (born April 12, 1952) is an American historian, poet and author, and civil servant. He served at the National Portrait Gallery as senior historian.

== Early life ==
Ward studied under Christopher Lasch and Eugene Genovese at University of Rochester, graduating in 1974, and subsequently attended graduate school at Warwick University (MA in labour history, 1975) and Yale University, MA (1975), MPhil, 1977).

== Senior historian at National Portrait Gallery ==
Ward began working at the National Portrait Gallery, Smithsonian Institution in 1979. Ward's early work was focused on American art, culture and portraiture. He worked on the documentary history project publishing five volumes on the selected papers of artist Charles Willson Peale and his family. In 2012, Ward was appointed associate director and senior historian.

=== Hide/Seek curator ===
Ward curated numerous shows at the National Portrait Gallery, including Hide/Seek: Difference and Desire in American Portraiture, Face Value:Abstraction in Portraiture, and The Face of Battle. Hide/Seek, which opened in 2010, was the first exhibit hosted by a museum of national stature to address the topic and as such invited immediate political attack from conservatives who falsely argued that Hide/Seek was gay propaganda. It was also the largest and most expensive exhibit in the NPG's history, and more private donors contributed to it than to any prior NPG exhibit. In 2010, Ward interviewed Patti Smith for her book Just Kids. This was related to Hide/Seek. In addition to this, Ward did shows on Whitman, Grant & Lee, Lincoln, and Alexander Gardner.

== Author ==
Ward has published two books of poetry, Call Waiting (2014) and Internal Difference (2011), both published by Carcanet Press. Ward "has published more than 100 poems in Anglo-American literary magazines". Ward in 2004 wrote, for the Smithsonian, an analytical biography of Charles Willson Peale, Charles Willson Peale: Art and Selfhood in the Early Republic (University of California Press, 2004).

== Exhibitions ==
- The Face of Battle (2017)
- The Sweat of Their Face (2015)
- Dark Fields of the Republic: Alexander Gardner's Photographs (2015)
- One Life: Grant & Lee (2014)
- Face Value: Portraiture in the Age of Abstraction (2014)
- Poetic Likeness: Modern American Poets (2012)
- Portraiture Now: Asian Americans Portraits of Encounter (2011)
- Hide/Seek: Difference and Desire in American Portraiture (2010)
- The Mask of Lincoln (2008)
- Walt Whitman (2006)

== Works ==
- Ward, David C. 2004 Charles Willson Peale: Art and Selfhood in the Early Republic Berkeley, California : University of California Press
- Ward, David C. 2010 Hide/Seek: Difference and Desire in American Portraiture Washington D.C.: Smithsonian Books
- Ward, David C. 2011 Internal Difference Manchester, United Kingdom: Carcanet Press
- Ward, David C. 2014 Call Waiting Manchester, United Kingdom: Carcanet Press
- Ward, David C. 2014 Face Value: Portraiture in the Age of Abstraction Washington D.C.: Smithsonian Books
