= Ralph A. Dungan =

American diplomat

Ralph Dungan
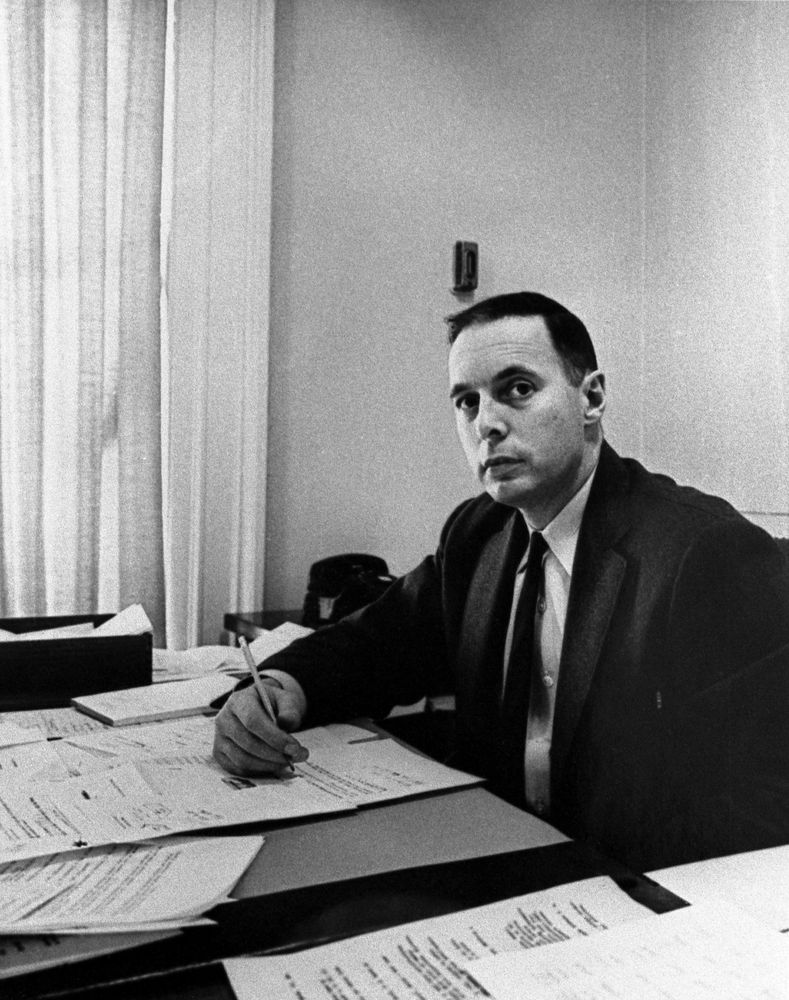

United States Ambassador to Chile
- In office December 10, 1964 – August 2, 1967
- President: Lyndon B. Johnson
- Preceded by: Charles W. Cole
- Succeeded by: Edward M. Korry

Personal details
- Born: April 22, 1923 Philadelphia, Pennsylvania, U.S.
- Died: October 5, 2013 (aged 90) Saint John, Barbados
- Party: Democratic
- Education: Saint Joseph's University (BA); Princeton University (MPA)

Ralph Anthony Dungan (April 22, 1923 – October 5, 2013) was an American diplomat and ambassador from the United States to Chile from December 10, 1964, to August 2, 1967. He was liaison between the Kennedy Administration and the Catholic Church.

== Early life and education ==
Dungan was born in Pennsylvania. His father was an attorney involved in the politics of the Democratic Party. During World War II, he served in the U.S. Navy as a flight instructor and then attended Saint Joseph's University in Philadelphia under the G.I. Bill. He married twice and had four sons and three daughters with his first wife, who died before him in 1987.

== Career ==
Prior to this appointment, Dungan was a legislative aide to Democratic Senator John F. Kennedy in 1956. In 1960, he worked on JFK's campaign to become the 35th U.S. president. JFK remained loyal to his associate of five years and named him one of his two White House Special Assistants to the President in 1961; the second was Arthur M. Schlesinger Jr. Dungan served as White House Special Assistant to the President in the Kennedy administration from 1961 to 1964. His assignments in the Kennedy years included service on a task force on foreign aid, handling White House African Affairs and then, finally, handling White House Latin American Affairs, which was his specialty and which he later turned into an ambassadorship during the Johnson Administration.

After his ambassadorship ended, Dungan was appointed to become the State of New Jersey's first Chancellor of Higher Education, serving from 1967 to 1977. In 1967, New Jersey was widely viewed by college admission officers as having one of the nation's weakest higher education systems. They also called it a "cuckoo state" for its poor record of keeping residents from going to school elsewhere. When his 10 years at this post ended in 1977, the New Jersey college system had grown from six to eight colleges and had a "vastly increased" student population. However, then President of Rutgers, Edward J. Bloustein, said of former Ambassador Dungan in 1975: "He's a nice guy, but he does not understand the nature of universities."

In 1977, Dungan became the executive director of the Inter-American Development Bank.

== Death ==
Dungan died at his home in Saint John, Barbados, according to his death notice, at the age of 90, due to complications following surgery. His personal papers can be found at the John F. Kennedy Presidential Library and Museum in Boston.

Diplomatic posts
Preceded by Charles W. Cole	United States Ambassador to Chile; 1964–1967	Succeeded by Edward M. Korry
