= Carl Hovde =

American academic

Dean of Columbia College
- In office 1968–1972
- Preceded by: Henry S. Coleman (interim)
- Succeeded by: Peter Pouncey

Personal details
- Born: October 11, 1926 Meadville, Pennsylvania, U.S.
- Died: September 5, 2009 (aged 82) New Canaan, Connecticut, U.S.
- Education: Columbia University (BA); Princeton University (PhD)

Carl Frederick Hovde (pronounced HUV-dee; October 11, 1926 – September 5, 2009) was an American educator who from 1968 until 1972 was the Dean of Columbia College, the undergraduate division of Columbia University. In that position, he served an important role in restoring order and calm on the campus after the six-week-long student protests in spring 1968 that had been led by the Students for a Democratic Society.

== Early life and education ==
Hovde was born in Meadville, Pennsylvania on October 11, 1926. His father, Bryn Hovde, was president of the New School for Social Research from 1945 to 1950. He enlisted in the United States Army in 1944 after graduating from high school and served in the European Theater of Operations during World War II. After completing his military service, he attended Columbia College, graduating with a bachelor's degree in philosophy in 1950. He received a Ph.D. in English from Princeton University in 1955 after completing a doctoral dissertation titled "The writing of Henry D. Thoreau's A week on the Concord and Merrimack Rivers: a study in textual materials and technique." He began his academic career with a position at Ohio State University.

== Columbia University ==
Hovde joined the Columbia University faculty in 1960 as a professor of comparative English literature. He was appointed as the dean of Columbia College in July 1968 under a process designed to assuage students in the wake of the recent protests, in which he was approved by Columbia President Grayson L. Kirk after being nominated by a committee composed of administrators and faculty members.

The students protests had begun in April 1968 in response to plans by Columbia to construct a gym in Morningside Park that was opposed by Harlem residents and by disclosures of university ties to the Institute for Defense Analyses, a weapons research think-tank connected with the United States Department of Defense. Several buildings on the campus were taken over, with windows damaged and files destroyed by student protesters. Police cleared out and arrested on charges of criminal trespassing a group of 700 students, but the protests persisted for weeks.

At the start of the protests, Hovde served on a faculty group that established a joint committee composed of administrators, faculty and students that established recommendations for addressing disciplinary action for the students involved in the protests. Once he was appointed as dean, Hovde stated that he felt that the "sit-ins and the demonstrations were not without cause" and opposed criminal charges being filed against the students by the university, though he did agree that the protesters "were acting with insufficient cause".

Hovde served as dean when the core curriculum underwent fundamental changes. Following his tenure as dean, the Columbia Daily Spectator credited Hovde with having "sought to quietly guide the college, not to rule it; to use the force of persuasion and reason, not the blunt power of authority". He later was a professor of English emeritus after a career as a longtime teacher of literature humanities. He received the Great Teacher Award from the Society of Columbia Graduates in 1975. After his retirement in 1995 he served as chair of the Friends of the Heyman Center and also as a member of the Society of Senior Scholars. Professor Hovde received the Award for Distinguished Service to the Core Curriculum in 1997–1998.

== Death ==
Hovde died at age 82 of lung cancer on September 5, 2009, at his wife's home in New Canaan, Connecticut. He was survived by his wife, Bertha Betts, two daughters, a son and four grandchildren. He had divorced his first wife, the former Jane Norris.

Academic offices
Preceded by Henry S. Coleman (Acting)	Dean of Columbia College; 1968–1972	Succeeded by Peter Pouncey
