= Angie Epifano =

Angie Epifano, a former student at Amherst College, gained widespread media attention and millions of page views after she wrote an essay on her personal experience of sexual assault that was published in the Amherst student newspaper, The Amherst Student. After the publication of her essay, Amherst College began investigating its sexual assault procedures, and women from other college campuses in the United States came forward to file federal complaints under Title IX and to form groups to reduce sexual assault on college campuses.

== Background ==
In 2011, Epifano was a freshman at Amherst College majoring in African Art history. During her freshman year, she told NPR that she was invited to watch a movie by an acquaintance and fell asleep during the movie (she reported she had not been drinking). When she awoke, she reported that the acquaintance was sexually assaulting her; the next morning she left and tried not to think about the assault. Her alleged assailant was never legally prosecuted or sanctioned by Amherst College. Nine months later she went to one of Amherst College's sexual assault guidance counselors. After some time and after seeing a second guidance counselor, she admitted to thinking about suicide and was forcibly admitted by Amherst College into a psychiatric ward for five days. She returned to school just before the end of the spring semester after she placed a restraining order on the person she alleged committed the assault. She subsequently dropped out of Amherst College and started working on a dude ranch in Wyoming during the fall of 2012. It was during this time that she became frustrated that she had left Amherst College without attempting to improve the support system for victims of sexual assault. She decided to do something about it by writing an essay on her experiences of the assault, with other students, and of the sexual assault support system at Amherst College.

== Epifano's essay ==
On 17 October 2012, The Amherst Student published an essay by Epifano on her personal experience of a sexual assault at Amherst College. She reported that she was raped by a male acquaintance on May 25, 2011, in a dormitory on the campus of Amherst College. Nine months after the alleged rape occurred, a friend suggested that she seek counseling. When she eventually did so, she reported in her essay that a campus sexual assault counselor told her "In short I was told: No you can't change dorms, there are too many students right now. Pressing charges would be useless, he's about to graduate, there's not much we can do. Are you SURE it was rape?" She described how the counseling center focused on her apparent psychological instability and placed her in a psychiatric hospital. Within the first week of publication of the essay, it received over 370,000 hits.

== Response ==
Immediately following the publication of Epifano's essay, Amherst College began reviewing its policies for handling sexual assault cases, brought in psychological experts, assigned new investigators, and started a "sexual respect" website. Amherst President Carolyn "Biddy" Martin stated "We need to do everything in our power to become a leader in encouraging victims to report sexual assault". Amherst College formed a Special Oversight Committee on Sexual Misconduct, which produced a critical report of the way sexual assault cases are handled at Amherst.

In November, 2013, Epifano and an anonymous former female former student filed a 113-page federal sexual assault complaint under Title IX. Subsequently, other complaints were filed under Title IX and the Clery Act. The complaints allege that Amherst and other schools violated Title IX by not providing a college environment that protects female students from discrimination and that the schools also violated the Clery Act by not keeping and making public information on campus crimes. After the publication of Epifano's essay, a group of activists formed "Know Your IX" website and group.

NPR contacted Amherst President Martin during the first week of April 2014 for comment and she replied:

Angie Epifano's account of her rape, her painful efforts to deal with it on her own, and her subsequent experiences when she sought help on campus are horrifying.

== Criticism ==
Wendy Kaminer writing for The Atlantic questioned how accurately Epifano could recall all of the events she reported in her essay. She concludes that "I'm not criticizing or judging Epifano for being acutely frightened and depressed" but rather that "I'm simply suggesting that different women react differently, according to their different circumstances, strengths and vulnerabilities."
