= Julian Gibbs =

American academic administrator

15th President of Amherst College
- In office 1979–1983
- Preceded by: John William Ward
- Succeeded by: Peter R. Pouncey

Personal details
- Born: June 24, 1924
- Died: February 20, 1983 (aged 58)
- Education: Amherst College; Princeton University

Julian Howard Gibbs (June 24, 1924 – February 20, 1983) was an American physical chemist and the fifteenth President of Amherst College. He was a pioneer in developing theoretical models for the glass transition.

In 1942, he entered Amherst College, but had to serve in the United States Navy for a year in the Pacific during World War II. In 1946, he married Cora Lee Gethman (1924-2016), daughter of YMCA officials who graduated Phi Beta Kappa from Smith College with a degree in art history in the same year and later served as a director of Newport Art Museum. They had a daughter, Judith Gibbs Shaw, and three sons, Jonathan, James and Jeffrey.

Gibbs graduated Phi Beta Kappa from Amherst in 1947 and then earned his master’s and Ph.D. degrees in 1949 and 1950 from Princeton University. After a year of postdoctoral study at University of Cambridge in England with a Fulbright Fellowship, he briefly taught at the University of Minnesota. Gibbs then worked for eight years at General Electric Company and American Viscose Corporation before accepting a position at Brown University in 1960 as associate professor of chemistry.

Starting from 1956, he published seminal articles on glass transition. Together with Edmund A. DiMarzio, he developed the thermodynamic basis for the glass transition, suggesting a second-order phase transition underlying the observed kinetic slowdown. Gibbs-DiMarzio theory remains influential and continues to be debated and refined.

He was named a full professor in 1963 and served as the chairman of the Chemistry Department at Brown from 1964 to 1972.

In 1965, Gerold Adam and he explained the dramatic increase in viscosity characteristic in glass-forming liquids at lower temperatures. They posited that molecular motion must become increasingly cooperative during cooling, requiring larger groups of molecules to move simultaneously, thus decreasing the configurational entropy and creating higher energy barriers. The Adam-Gibbs equation connects this entropy to the relaxation time and is now applied well beyond polymer chemistry.

In 1967 he won the High Polymer Prize of the American Physical Society. He succeeded John William Ward in 1979 as President of Amherst College and served as president for five years until his death in 1983 due to a heart attack. He continued his chemical research while he was president. The Archives and Special Collections at Amherst College holds a collection of his papers.

Academic offices
Preceded by John William Ward	President of Amherst College; 1979–1983	Succeeded by G. Armour Craig (acting)
