= Henry S. Coleman =

American academic (1926–2006)

Dean of Columbia College
- Interim
- In office 1967–1968
- Preceded by: David B. Truman
- Succeeded by: Carl Hovde

Personal details
- Born: April 20, 1926 Manhattan, New York City, U.S.
- Died: January 31, 2006 (aged 79) Norwalk, Connecticut, U.S.
- Education: Columbia University (BS)

Henry Simmons Coleman (April 20, 1926 – January 31, 2006) was an American educational administrator who was serving as acting dean of Columbia College, Columbia University when he was held hostage in an office for a day by the Students for a Democratic Society during the Columbia University protests of 1968 and later wrote letters of recommendation to law school for some of the students involved in the protests. In 1972, he was shot five times by a disgruntled student who had been asked to withdraw from the university due to poor grades.

== Early life and education ==
Coleman was born on April 20, 1926, in the New York City borough of Manhattan and attended The Hill School. As part of the V-12 Navy College Training Program, under which students carried a heavy course load year-round to complete their college studies faster than usual, he was sent to Columbia University, though he had originally planned on attending Princeton University. While an undergraduate, he was captain of the crew team and participated on the Columbian and Spectator publications.

After graduating from the Columbia University School of Engineering in February 1946 with a bachelor of science degree in mechanical engineering, he attended a reserve midshipmen's school and then spent six months serving in the United States Navy as an ensign, serving again on active duty for two years during the Korean War. After completing his military service during World War II, he completed a graduate degree in engineering in 1948.

== Columbia University ==
The university hired him in 1948 to operate a scholarship program, and through 1972 he administered all financial aid programs at the school as assistant to the dean. During this period, Coleman was coach of the varsity lightweight crew. After a break for military service, he was named assistant dean in 1958. He was named director of admissions in 1960, where he initiated a process to increase diversity on campus, deemphasizing the role of standardized tests.

When the student protests erupted on the Columbia campus in April 1968, he was serving as acting dean of Columbia College, having been named to the post the previous year. Though he was much liked – a contemporaneous student description stated that he was "a much better dean than anybody expected" – S.D.S. leader Mark Rudd announced that Coleman would be their hostage of choice and that the nearly 700 protesters occupying Hamilton Hall would remain there until their demands were met.

Though he was not in his office when the takeover was initiated, he made his way into the building past protesters, went into his office and stated that "I have no control over the demands you are making, but I have no intention of meeting any demand under a situation such as this." He was detained in his office as furniture was placed to keep him from leaving. He had been provided with food while being held and was able to leave 24 hours later, with The New York Times describing his departure from the siege as "showing no sign that he had been unsettled by the experience". The initial wave of protests ended a week later when Mayor of New York John Lindsay sent in 1,000 officers from the New York City Police Department to clear out the buildings.

On July 25, 1972, Coleman was hit by several bullets fired by Eldridge McKinney, a student who had been asked to withdraw from school due to poor grades and who was described as "livid" when he entered the Columbia administration building and advanced to Dean Coleman's office. Coleman was taken to St. Luke's Hospital. McKinney disappeared and as of 2022, has not been seen by anyone after the 1972 incident.

Shortly after the shooting, Columbia University administration members stated that new security measures would be implemented in the wake of the shooting, but that the goal would be to maintain a relaxed atmosphere on campus. When classes resumed in September, Coleman was back at his desk with his right arm still in a cast, after having been in the hospital for ten days for a lung punctured by a bullet and then spending two weeks recuperating at home before he returned to his duties on a part-time schedule.

He served as dean of students until his retirement in 1979. He was honored in 1996 with the college's John Jay Award for distinguished professional achievement, which recognized his status as a war veteran who "calmly refused to be bullied or coerced, and retained the respect of hawks and doves alike" in his actions during the 1968 student protests.

After his retirement, he began a guidance firm for college-bound high school students and administered various scholarship programs.

== Death ==
A resident of New Canaan, Connecticut, Coleman died at age 79 due to a blood disorder on January 31, 2006, in Norwalk, Connecticut. He was survived by his wife, the former Lila Heffelfinger; two daughters, a son and nine grandchildren.

Academic offices
Preceded by David B. Truman	Dean of Columbia College; 1967-1968 (Acting)	Succeeded by Carl Hovde
