= Rowland Abiodun =

Yoruba historian

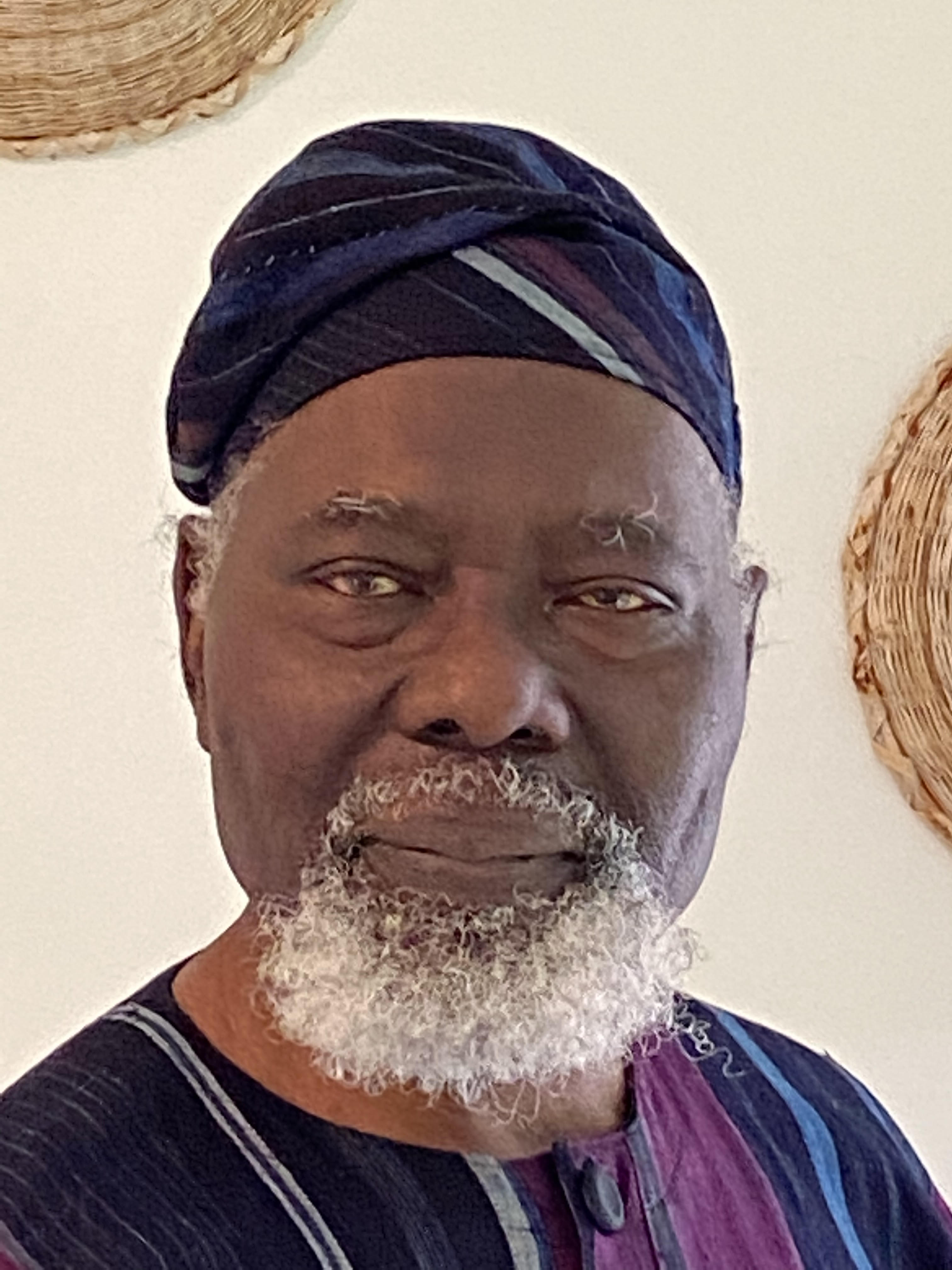
- Born: 1941 (age 84–85); Owo
- Citizenship: Nigerian
- Education: Ahmadu Bello University University of Toronto (B.A Fine Art, M.A Art History)
- Occupation: Art Historian
- Known for: African Art Studies

Rowland O. Abiodun (, b. 1941), is a Nigerian-American professor and author best known for his contributions to the field of African Art Studies, especially Yoruba Art. He is currently the John C. Newton Professor of Art, the History of Art, and Black Studies at Amherst College, Amherst, Massachusetts.

== Education and Career ==
He earned his B.A. in Fine Arts in 1965 from Ahmadu Bello University, Zaria, Nigeria, and his M.A. in Art History from the University of Toronto. Born in Owo Nigeria, Abiodun has written extensively about the body of art produced by the Yoruba people of modern-day Nigeria and Benin. Abiodun is the John C. Newton Professor of Art, the History of Art, and Black Studies at Amherst College. He has served as a director of the African Studies Association and has sat on the advisory board for the Smithsonian's National Museum of African Art.

== Exhibitions ==
Abiodun has curated several prominent exhibitions of African art in the United States. His exhibition Artist as Explorer: African Art from the Walt Disney-Tishman Collection, displayed at the National Geographic Society's Explorer Hall, debuted two years before the Smithsonian acquired the Disney-Tishman Collection. The exhibition Yoruba: Nine Centuries of African Art and Thought which he co-curated with Henry John Drewal, John Pemberton III and Allen Wardwell included art works from Lagos and Ife, some of which had not previously been seen in the United States before being displayed at the Center for African Art and the Art Institute of Chicago.

== Publications ==
Abiodun has written over 40 books and articles on African art. His writings on Yoruba Art have shaped the interpretation of African art in the United States, among these his 2014 book, Yoruba art and language: seeking the African in African art. The Smithsonian National Museum of African Art has presented Abiodun's commentary in its Visionary: Viewpoints on Africa's Arts exhibition.

== Awards ==
In 2011 Abiodun received the ACASA Leadership Award, an award for "an individual whose accomplishments best exemplify excellence in the study of African and/or African Diasporic arts and/or whose innovative contributions and vision have advanced the field."

== Bibliography ==
- Yoruba Art and Language: Seeking the African in African Art. Cambridge University Press, 2014.
- What Follows Six Is More than Seven: Understanding African Art. British Museum Department of Ethnography, 1995.
