= Tom Gerety =

American lawyer and philosopher

17th President of Amherst College
- In office 1994–2003
- Preceded by: Peter R. Pouncey
- Succeeded by: Anthony W. Marx

Personal details
- Education: Yale University (BA, MPhil, PhD, JD)
- Occupation: Professor; Lawyer; Administrator

Tom Gerety is an American lawyer and philosopher. He is a former president of both Trinity College (Connecticut) (1989-1994) and Amherst College (1994–2003).

After leaving Amherst College, he became the executive director of the Brennan Center for Justice (2003-2005) at New York University School of Law where he is now Collegiate Professor. He is the author of law review articles and The Freshman Who Hated Socrates, a book on liberal arts education.

Academic offices
Preceded by Peter Pouncey	President of Amherst College; 1994–2003	Succeeded by Anthony Marx
