= Calvin Plimpton =

American college president (1918–2007)

Calvin Hastings Plimpton
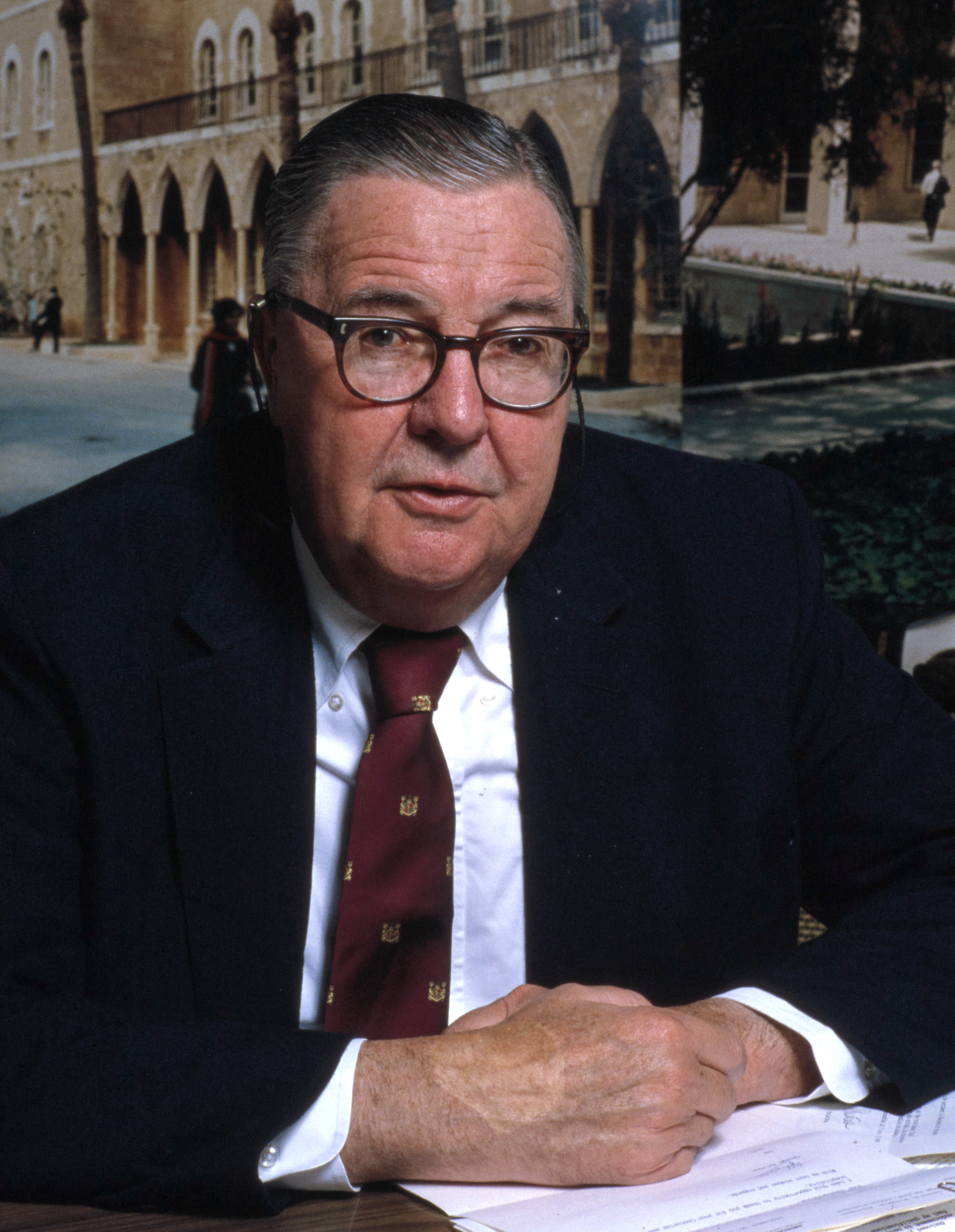
- Plimpton in the mid-1980s

13th President of Amherst College
- In office 1960–1971
- Preceded by: Charles Woolsey Cole
- Succeeded by: John William Ward

Personal details
- Born: October 7, 1918 Boston, Massachusetts, United States
- Died: January 30, 2007 (aged 88) Westwood, Massachusetts, United States
- Spouse: Ruth Talbot
- Children: David; Polly; Tom; Edward
- Education: Amherst College (1939); Harvard Medical School (1943); Harvard University (M.S., 1947); Columbia University (Ph.D., 1952)

Calvin Hastings Plimpton (7 October 1918 – 30 January 2007) was an American physician and educator, who served as president of Amherst College and American University of Beirut. He is known for appointing a commission in 1970 whose findings resulted in the admission of women to Amherst in 1975.

Plimpton was the son of George Arthur Plimpton, who was chairman of the Amherst board of trustees from 1906 to 1936. His mother was Fanny "Anne" Hastings, and through her he was descended from Thomas Hastings, who came from the East Anglia region of England to the Massachusetts Bay Colony in 1634. Plimpton attended Phillips Exeter Academy and received a bachelor's degree from Amherst, where he was a member of Delta Kappa Epsilon fraternity. He received master's and M.D. degrees from Harvard University and a Doctor of Medical Science degree from Columbia University. He served in the U.S. Army as a captain during World War II. He later taught at Columbia.

Plimpton was president of Amherst from 1960 to 1971 (Plimpton House, now a dormitory, was named in his honour), president of Downstate Medical Center, Brooklyn, N.Y., a division of the State University of New York, from 1971 to 1979 and president of American University of Beirut from 1984 to 1987. John William Ward was his successor at Amherst College. Ward was successful in making it co-ed.

Academic offices
| Preceded by Charles W. Cole | President of Amherst College; 1960–1971 | Succeeded by John William Ward |
