= Arthur Stanley Pease =

Arthur Stanley Pease (September 22, 1881 – January 7, 1964) was a professor of Classics, a respected amateur botanist, and the tenth president of Amherst College in Amherst, Massachusetts. Pease was once described by his fellow faculty members as an "indefatigable pedestrian, and New Englander to the core."

== Personal life ==
Arthur Stanley Pease was born in his grandfather's Somers, Connecticut parsonage. He was the son of Theodore Claudius Pease, briefly a professor at Andover Theological Seminary before his sudden death, and his wife Abby Frances Cutter Pease. Pease was educated at Phillips Academy in Andover, Massachusetts and while living there he acquainted himself with the plants growing in the towns of Essex County. Pease said of his early life:

I will confess that I am by nature a collector, that I began with marbles and horse chestnuts, advanced to postage stamps, continued with botany and books, and at all times have gathered facts and occasional ideas.

After earning his terminal degree, Pease travelled to Europe and spent most of his time there in Italy and Greece. In 1909, Pease married Henrietta Faxon in Cohasset, Massachusetts. Their only child, Henrietta Faxon Pease, was born July 14, 1912. She grew up and married the pioneering anthropologist and primatologist Sherwood "Sherry" Washburn in 1939. They had two children — Sherwood ("Tuck") and Stan — and at least six grandchildren.

== Academic career ==
Pease attended Harvard College and Harvard University and received AB (1902), AM (1903), and PhD (1905) degrees in classical studies. From 1906 to 1909 he taught Latin at Harvard and Radcliffe College. From 1909 to 1924 he taught at the University of Illinois. Pease starting teaching at Amherst College in 1924 and was appointed college president in 1927. According to a Time magazine's account of his appointment:

He is less of a liberal than Dr. Alexander Meiklejohn, Amherst's eighth president; he is less of an administrator than Dr. George D. Olds, Amherst's ninth president. But, as a distinguished scholar, he fulfills the presidential needs of a small New England college.

Five years later, Pease resigned from the presidency of Amherst College to return to his alma mater again as a Latin professor. At Harvard, he was appointed Pope Professor of Latin in 1942 and was made became Professor Emeritus upon his retirement in 1950. During his lengthy academic career, Pease articulated the following philosophy of education:

...from the first grade to graduate school, the aims are threefold: first, to fit us for more successful practice of our respective callings; second, to enrich and refresh our lives with more intelligent and varied avocations; and, third, to render us more helpful in our manifold relations to the community at large.

Pease further expounded on his personal views and habits when he said:

...in lack of sufficient cranial space for dead storage, I enter (facts and ideas) methodically on 3 x 5 slips of paper. When enough of a kind are amassed, they are outspread, classified, digested, written down, dehydrated, and lo! and article, or more rarely a book, to be pursued by some lone watcher in Czechoslovakia or beside the Bay of Biscay. Still onward, however, boiling down like Aristotle and the maple-syrup makers, a thousand gallons of facts to a half-pint of principles; or, to change the figure, bringing order into a few of life's storage closets, discovering there some garments which still have good wear in them, and persuading my students to wrap this rainment about their intellectual nakedness. All of which, as Augustine says, is "a great task and a difficult, but God is our helper.

== Botany ==
Although a classicist by training, Pease was also "an outstanding amateur field botanist" and "it is Professor Pease's work in New England botany for which he will be especially remembered.

Pease traveled with Merritt Lyndon Fernald on botanical expeditions to Mount Logan in southwestern Yukon, to northern Newfoundland, to Nova Scotia, and to Gaspé Peninsula in Quebec. About him Fernald wrote "how, with such a keen interest in plants and their natural habitats, he was lured into classical philology is beyond the comprehension of a mere botanist of more limited horizon." In naming the flowering plant Draba peasei, in Pease's honor, Fernald wrote:

...it is a great pleasure to associate the name of its discoverer, ARTHUR STANLEY PEASE, distinguished classical scholar and keen amateur botanist, (to this plant that) was at first identified by me as D. oligosperma Hook. of the Rocky Mountain region...

Other plants named after Pease include the perennial plant Antennaria peasei, the hawkweed Hieracium peasei, and Salix peasei, a type of willow. Pease himself named a long list of taxa including species in the Aster, Botrychium, Carex, Agropyron, Potentilla, Houstonia, and Epifagus genera.

An enthusiastic mountaineer as well as an avid botanist, Pease collected and studied plant life in the White Mountains of New Hampshire. He shared his findings, including "Vascular flora of Co`s County, New Hampshire", in the publications of the Boston Society of Natural History and the New England Botanic Club eventually leading to the posthumous 1964 publication of A flora of northern New Hampshire. Pease's studies of the vegetation around in the vicinity of his summer home in Randolph, New Hampshire led him to say that it "has probably changed more materially during the last hundred years than at any period of the same length since the last glacial epoch." Some of the specimens Pease collected in New Hampshire are now kept at the University of North Carolina at Chapel Hill.

Pease also collaborated with Richard Evans Schultes in writing Generic Names of Orchids: their origin and meaning(1963). Among Pease's donations to the Gray Herbarium at Harvard University and the New England Botanical Club was his 12,000 specimen herbarium.

== Other work ==
Besides his many botanical articles, Pease published a considerable amount of material on classical languages and literatures, his academic speciality. His most famous work in this field is a detailed commentary of Book Four of Vergil's Aeneid. In some cases, Pease combined his vocation (classics) with his avocation (botany) in the publication of papers such as "Notes on ancient grafting" (1933) and "Mythology and mycology" (1947). Pease also published a 1946 memoir, Sequestered vales of life, which includes remembrances and anecdotes of his career and hobbies.

Much of his personal papers, including correspondence with figures of historical interest and various manuscripts, are now kept by Harvard's Houghton Library in Cambridge, Massachusetts. Other manuscripts and written materials relating to his life and work — including his correspondence with Amherst College treasurer and botanist Frederick Tuckerman (not to be confused with the poet Frederick Goddard Tuckerman) — are in the possession of Amherst College Archives and Special Collections.

Academic offices
Preceded by George Olds	President of Amherst College; 1927–1932	Succeeded by Stanley King
