= John William Ward (professor) =

American academic

14th President of Amherst College
- In office 1971–1979
- Preceded by: Calvin Hastings Plimpton
- Succeeded by: Julian Gibbs

Chairman of the Ward Commission
- In office 1978–1981
- Appointed by: Michael Dukakis

Personal details
- Born: 1922 Boston, Massachusetts
- Died: 1985 (aged 62–63) New York, New York
- Party: Democratic
- Spouse: Barbara Carnes
- Children: Three sons (including Christopher O. Ward; David C. Ward)
- Education: Harvard College BA; University of MinnesotaPhD

John William Ward (1922–1985), was the 14th President of Amherst College, a veteran of World War II, Professor of English and History at Princeton University, and Chairman of the Ward Commission.

== Early life and education ==
Ward was born in Boston, Massachusetts, the son of John Joseph Ward, a physician, and Margaret Mary Carrigan. Ward attended Boston Latin school where he played football, captaining the team his senior season when it went undefeated. He entered Harvard College in 1941. (Note: Reportedly he planned to follow his father's profession, so initially signed up to major in biochemistry.) However, he enlisted in the Marine Corps after the attack on Pearl Harbor. He served as a drill instructor at Paris Island (SC) and on the heavy cruiser USS Augusta. Demobilized in 1945, he returned to Harvard, changed his concentration from pre-med to history and literature, and graduated with honors in 1947–48, albeit as a member of the class of 1945 because of his wartime service. After a brief period in retail, he enrolled in the doctoral program in English and American Studies at the University of Minnesota, where his advisor was Henry Nash Smith. Leo Marx, another Smith student was also on the faculty, and he and Ward became lifelong friends and colleagues.

== Professor at Princeton and Amherst ==
He went to become a professor of English and History at Princeton University from 1952 to 1964. At Princeton, he became Chair of the Special Program in American Civilization. He was also a teacher and mentor to Bill Bradley. He began his long association with Amherst College in 1964 when he accepted a chair in History and American Studies. He was a professor from 1964 to 1971. It was during this time that Ward would publish Andrew Jackson: Symbol for an Age (1955), and Red, White, and Blue: Men, Books, and Ideas in American Culture 1969.

== President of Amherst College ==
In 1971, Ward became the fourteenth President of Amherst College, a position he held until 1979. Perhaps more than anything, Ward's presidency at Amherst was marked by the introduction of coeducation. The Trustees of the college reluctantly voted in favor of it in November 1974, the first female students were admitted in the fall of 1975, and the first women graduated in June 1976. Ward will also be remembered during his presidency for participating in a 1972 antiwar protest at Westover Air Force Base in Chicopee, Massachusetts, where he and 471 other protesters blocked traffic for more than thirty minutes. The protesters, including Ward, his wife Barbara, several Amherst faculty members and several hundred Amherst students, were arrested for disturbing the peace. Ward's participation stirred both approval and outrage, as well as a large volume of media coverage and commentary, related to the appropriateness of a college president's involvement in individual acts of civil disobedience. Ward resigned after eight years of the presidency to head the Ward Commission.

== American studies ==
Best known as a central figure of the Myth and Symbol School of American studies scholarship, Ward was one of the few university presidents during the Vietnam era to participate in direct activism against the escalation of conflict in Southeast Asia, and was the only university president to be arrested for doing so. His decision to protest the war was informed by his basic view of history and the role of American mythologies in American life, including and most importantly the mythology of absolute freedom and equality implied by Jeffersonian democracy. For Ward, history was made when individuals put their ideals into action, and for this reason Ward spent much of his career exploring contradictions in ideology, especially emphasizing the contradiction between the individual's freedom to act in socially responsible manner and the increasing bureaucratization of life that limited the possibility of such action. His most well known book, Andrew Jackson: Symbol for An Age treats Andrew Jackson as a symbol embodying 19th century ideology. Other figures who Ward treated as symbolic of contradictions in America's myths about itself include John F. Kennedy, Henry David Thoreau, Charles Lindbergh, and the Anarchist activist Alexander Berkman.

Like many academics in the humanities during the Cold War, Ward refrained from direct opposition to American foreign policy for most of his career, although his work, much of which is included in his career retrospective Red, White, and Blue: Men, Books, and Ideas in American Culture, implies a dialectical approach to understanding culture that would influence the New Left and other expressly radical critics. As with many writers in the myth and symbol school, such as Leo Marx, who have been misunderstood by recent cultural critics writing in what has become known as the "cold war consensus" view of American academic history, Ward was attempting through the course of his career to forward a complex criticism of American culture rather than a mere celebration of American hegemony. For Ward, such criticism led inevitably to direct activism. The failure of the New Left to credit their own academic theories to the sometimes radical critiques underlying the myth and symbol criticism in which they were initiated as students has been referred to by recent writers as "New Left amnesia"..

== Ward Commission ==
After resigning as Amherst College President in 1979, Ward worked for two years as Chairman of the Commission Concerning State and County Buildings in Massachusetts. Called the Ward Commission, it investigated corruption in public housing projects and other government projects. Ward was credited with a strong sense of ethics as he led the more than two and a half year study. The final document is over 2,000 pages in length and was released on December 31, 1981. A major outcome of the study was the creation of the Office of the Inspector General. This office has come into prominence in the monitoring of state agencies and government. It was the first such state agency in the country. Ward was acknowledged for his leadership.

In July 1982 Ward moved into the presidency of the American Council of Learned Societies, an umbrella organization over many academic societies devoted to the advancement of humanistic studies.

In 1985, he received an honorary doctorate from the University of Minnesota.

== Family life and death ==
Ward married Barbara Carnes in 1949, and they had three sons. Little has been published about their family life. His eldest son, David C. Ward served as Senior Historian of the National Portrait Gallery. He is also a published author and poet.

== Legacy ==
His son, Christopher O. Ward, was appointed executive director of the Port Authority of New York and New Jersey in 2008. He was appointed by New York's first African American Governor, David Paterson. Paterson is the son of Basil Paterson member of the Gang of Four (Harlem). Chris Ward also served as Mayor Michael Bloomberg's first DEP Commissioner from 2002 to 2005.

== Works ==
- Ward, John William 1955. Andrew Jackson, Symbol for an Age. New York: Oxford University Press.
- Ward, John William. 1969 Red, White, and Blue: Men, Books, and Ideas in American Culture . New York: Oxford University Press

== Notes ==
Academic offices
Preceded by Calvin Plimpton	President of Amherst College; 1971–1979	Succeeded by Julian Gibbs
