= Peter Pouncey =

British-American writer

Peter R. Pouncey

16th President of Amherst College
- In office 1984–1994
- Preceded by: Julian Gibbs
- Succeeded by: Tom Gerety

Dean of Columbia College
- In office 1972–1976
- Preceded by: Carl Hovde
- Succeeded by: Robert L. Belknap (acting)

Personal details
- Born: October 1, 1937 Qingdao, China
- Died: May 30, 2023 (aged 85) Canaan, Connecticut, U.S.
- Children: 3
- Education: University of Oxford (BA); Columbia University (PhD)

Peter R. Pouncey (October 1, 1937 – May 30, 2023) was a British-American author, classicist, and president of Amherst College. He was known for his wit, his erudition, and his sophisticated works of both academic analysis and fiction.

== Biography ==
The son of a British father and a French-British mother, he was born in Qingdao, China. At the end of World War II, after several dislocations and separations, his family reassembled in England. Pouncey was educated there in boarding schools. He earned a Bachelor of Arts in classics at the University of Oxford in 1964 and a Master of Arts in 1967. For a time, he studied for the Jesuit priesthood but ultimately experienced a loss of faith.

Shortly after obtaining a Ph.D. from Columbia University in 1969, he was appointed assistant professor of Greek and Latin in the Classics Department. As a professor in Columbia's Classics Department, he produced a number of notable works of scholarship, including the book The Necessities of War: A Study of Thucydides' Pessimism, which won the university's Lionel Trilling Award.

=== Dean of Columbia College ===
In 1972, he became Dean of Columbia College. As Dean, he was a forceful advocate of coeducation, going so far as to hold a faculty vote without the knowledge of the university's president, William McGill. McGill rejected the proposal, due to concerns about the future of Barnard College. In September 1972, Pouncey officially recognized a student lounge for gay students, thought to be a first in higher education. In 1976, Pouncey resigned as Dean.

=== President of Amherst College ===
In 1984, he became President of Amherst College in Massachusetts. Pouncey focused on creating a new social life on campus after the abolition of fraternities and increasing diversity both with respect to students andn faculty. During his tenure, the endowment grew from $132 million to more than $320 million.

Upon his retirement from Amherst in 1994, he returned to Columbia. His novel Rules for Old Men Waiting won the McKitterick Prize and was nominated for the Commonwealth Writers Prize in 2006.

For many years, Pouncey divided his time between New York City and northern Connecticut.

== Personal life and death ==
Pouncey had two biological children and one step-child. He was married and divorced three times. His second wife, Susan Rieger, author of The Divorce Papers and The Heirs, is a former admissions officer at Columbia University. Their daughter, Maggie Pouncey, is the author of the novel Perfect Reader. His third wife, Katherine Dalsimer, is a Clinical Professor of Psychology at Weill Medical College of Cornell University, and an author.

Peter Pouncey died in Canaan, Connecticut on May 30, 2023, at the age of 85.

== Works ==
- The Necessities of War: A Study of Thucydides' Pessimism, Columbia University Press, (1980) ISBN 978-0-231-04994-8
- Rules for Old Men Waiting (2005) ISBN 0-8129-7396-8

== Notes ==
Academic offices
Preceded by Carl Hovde	Dean of Columbia College; 1972 – 1976	Succeeded by Robert L. Belknap (acting)
Preceded by Julian Gibbs	President of Amherst College; 1984–1994	Succeeded by Tom Gerety
