= Amherst College =

Private college in Amherst, Massachusetts, US

Coordinates: 42°22′15″N 72°31′01″W

- Latin: Collegium Amherstiense
- Motto: Terras Irradient (Latin)
- Motto in English: Let them enlighten the lands
- Type: Private liberal arts college
- Established: 1821; 205 years ago
- Accreditation: NECHE
- Academic affiliations: Annapolis Group; COFHE; Five Colleges; NAICU
- Endowment: $3.9 billion (2025)
- President: Michael A. Elliott
- Faculty: 338 (fall 2024)
- Undergraduates: 1,914 (fall 2024)
- Location: Amherst, Massachusetts, United States
- Campus: Rural 1,000 acres (4.0 km^{2})
- Colors: Purple & white
- Sporting affiliations: NCAA Division III –: NESCAC; NEISA
- Mascot: Mammoths
- Website: www.amherst.edu

Amherst College (/ˈæmərst/ AM-ərst) is a private liberal arts college in Amherst, Massachusetts, United States. Founded in 1821 as an attempt to relocate Williams College by its then-president Zephaniah Swift Moore, Amherst is the third oldest institution of higher education in Massachusetts. The institution was named after the town, which in turn had been named after Jeffery, Lord Amherst, Commander-in-Chief of British forces of North America during the French and Indian War. Originally established as a men's college, Amherst became coeducational in 1975.

Amherst is an exclusively undergraduate four-year institution. 1,914 full-time students were enrolled in fall 2024. Admissions are highly selective. Students choose courses from 42 major programs in an open curriculum and are not required to study a core curriculum or fulfill any distribution requirements; students may also design their own interdisciplinary major.

Amherst competes in the NCAA Division III as a member of the New England Small College Athletic Conference. Amherst has historically had close relationships and rivalries with Williams College and Wesleyan University, which form the Little Three colleges. The college is also a member of the Five College Consortium, which allows its students to attend classes at four other Pioneer Valley institutions: Mount Holyoke College, Smith College, Hampshire College, and the University of Massachusetts Amherst.

== History ==
=== Founding and 19th century ===
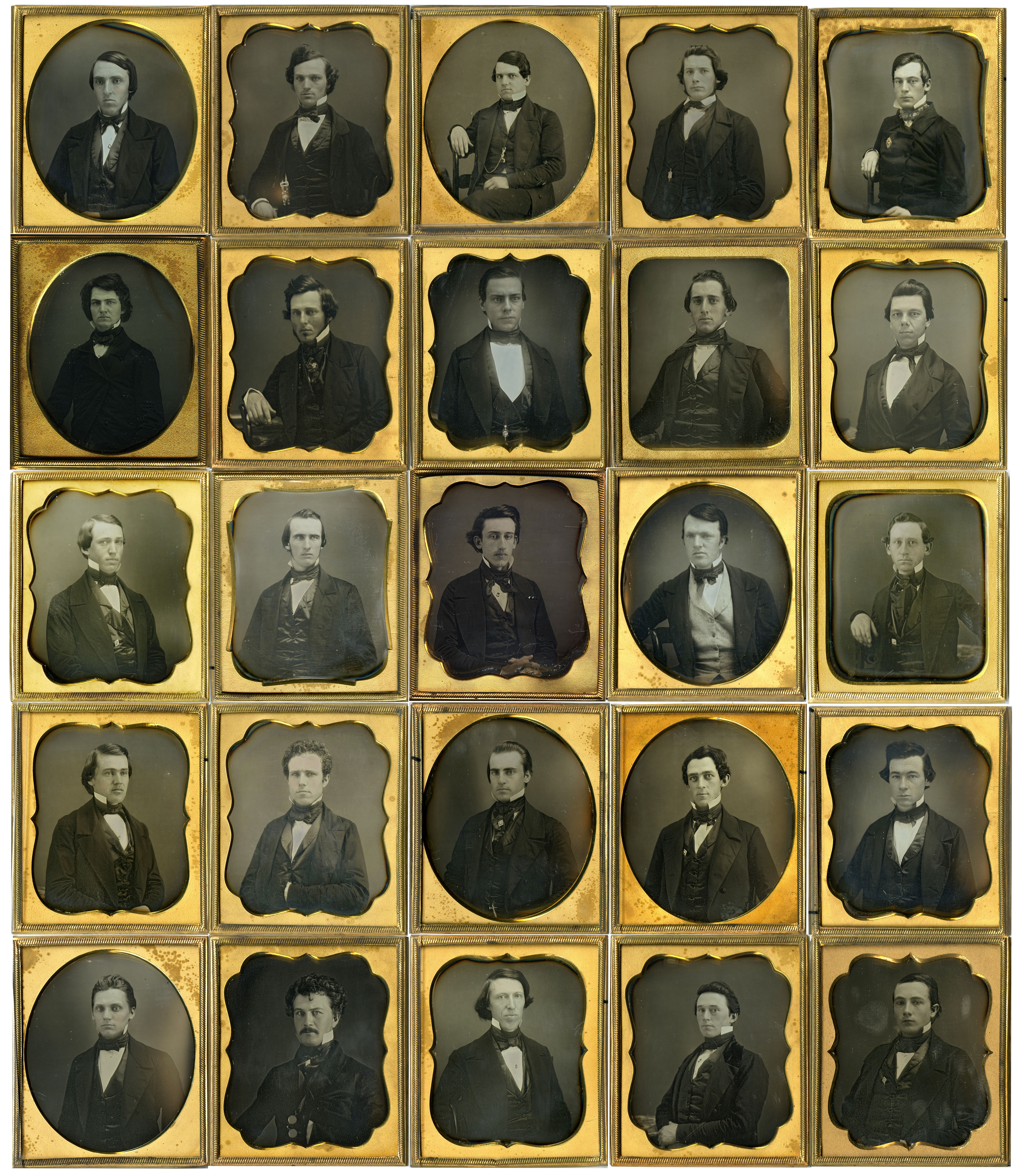
The Amherst graduating class of 1850, including William Austin Dickinson (second row, far left), brother of poet Emily Dickinson

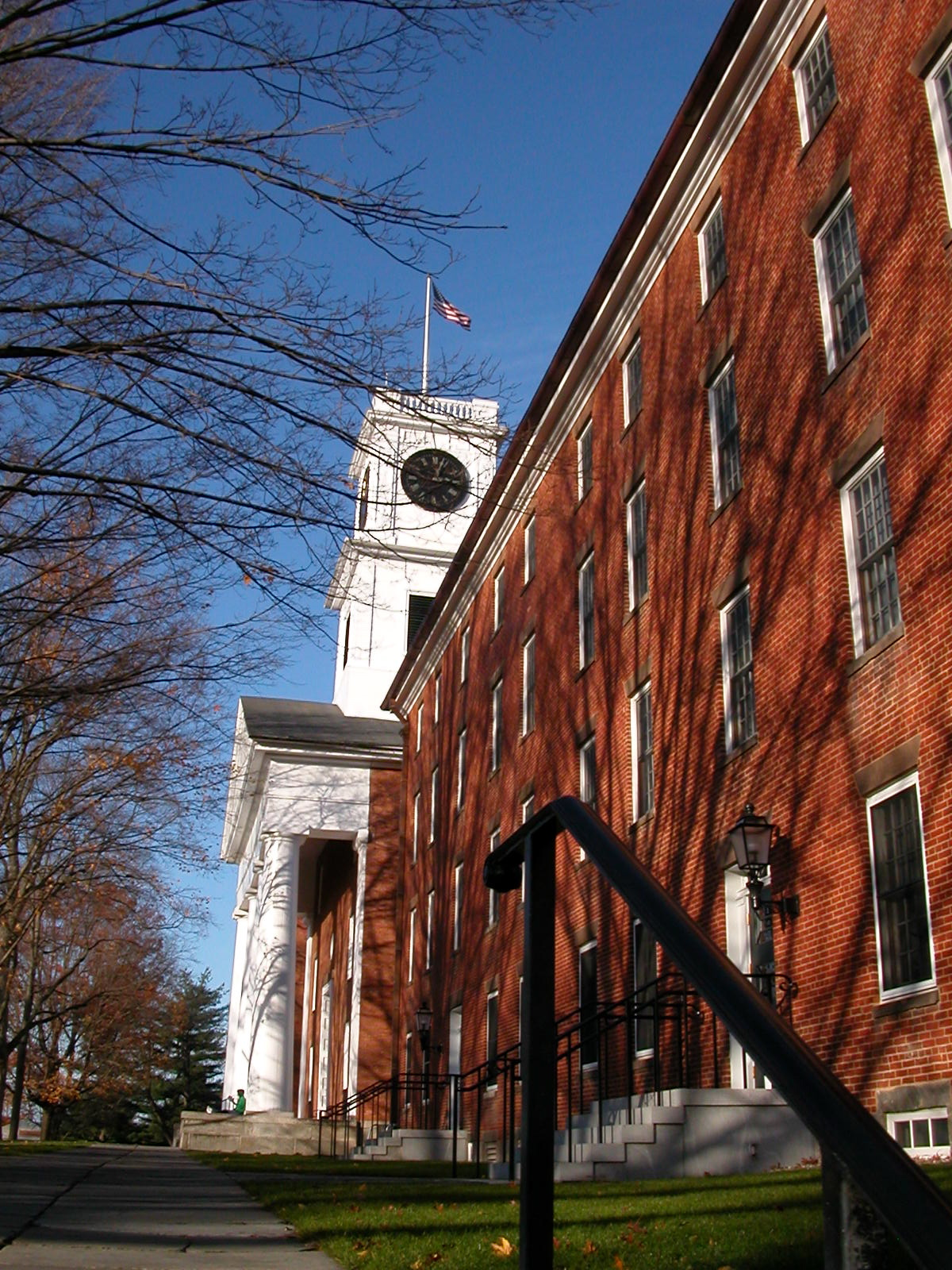
College Row, consisting of Williston, South, North, and Appleton halls, with Johnson Chapel at center

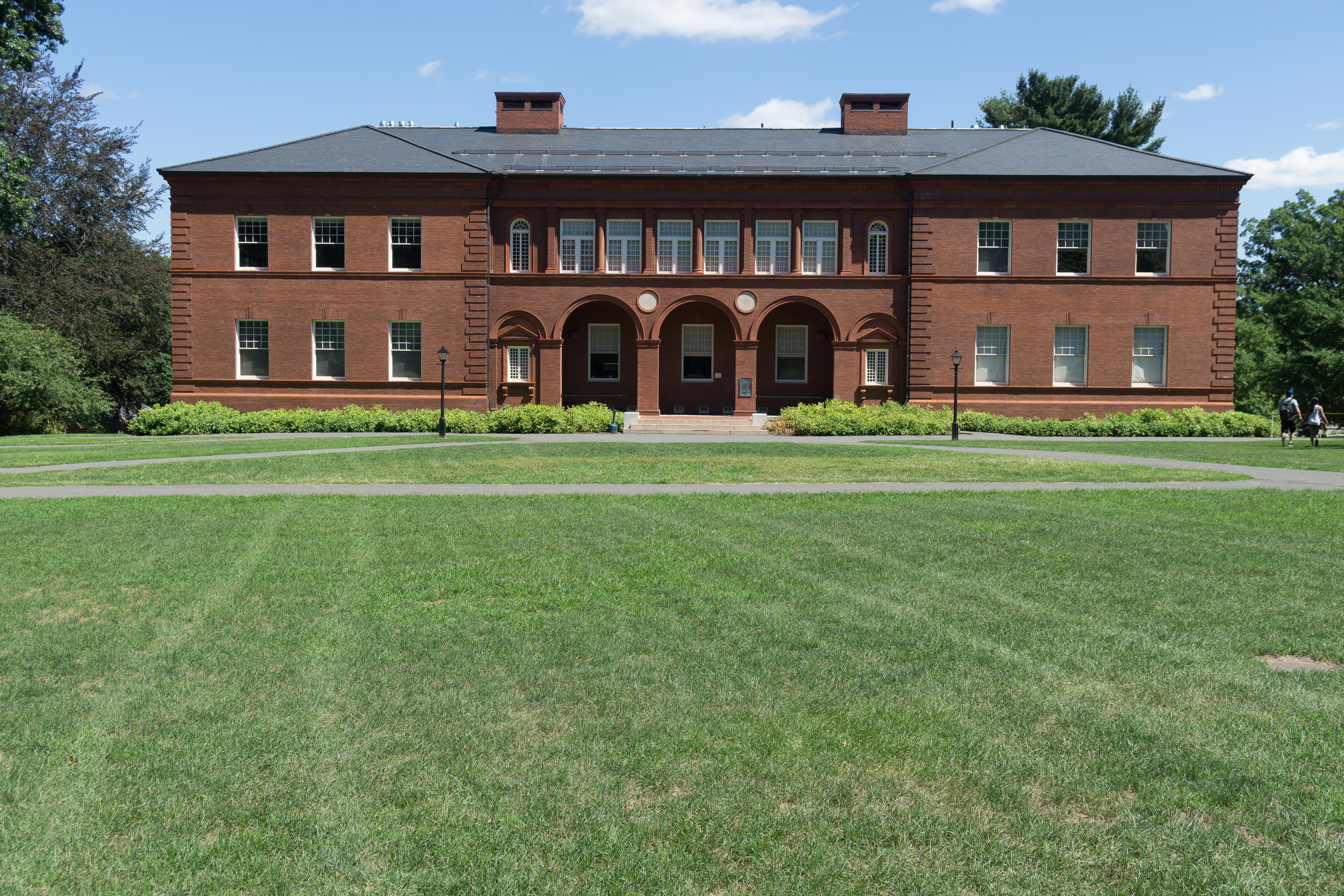
Fayerweather Hall

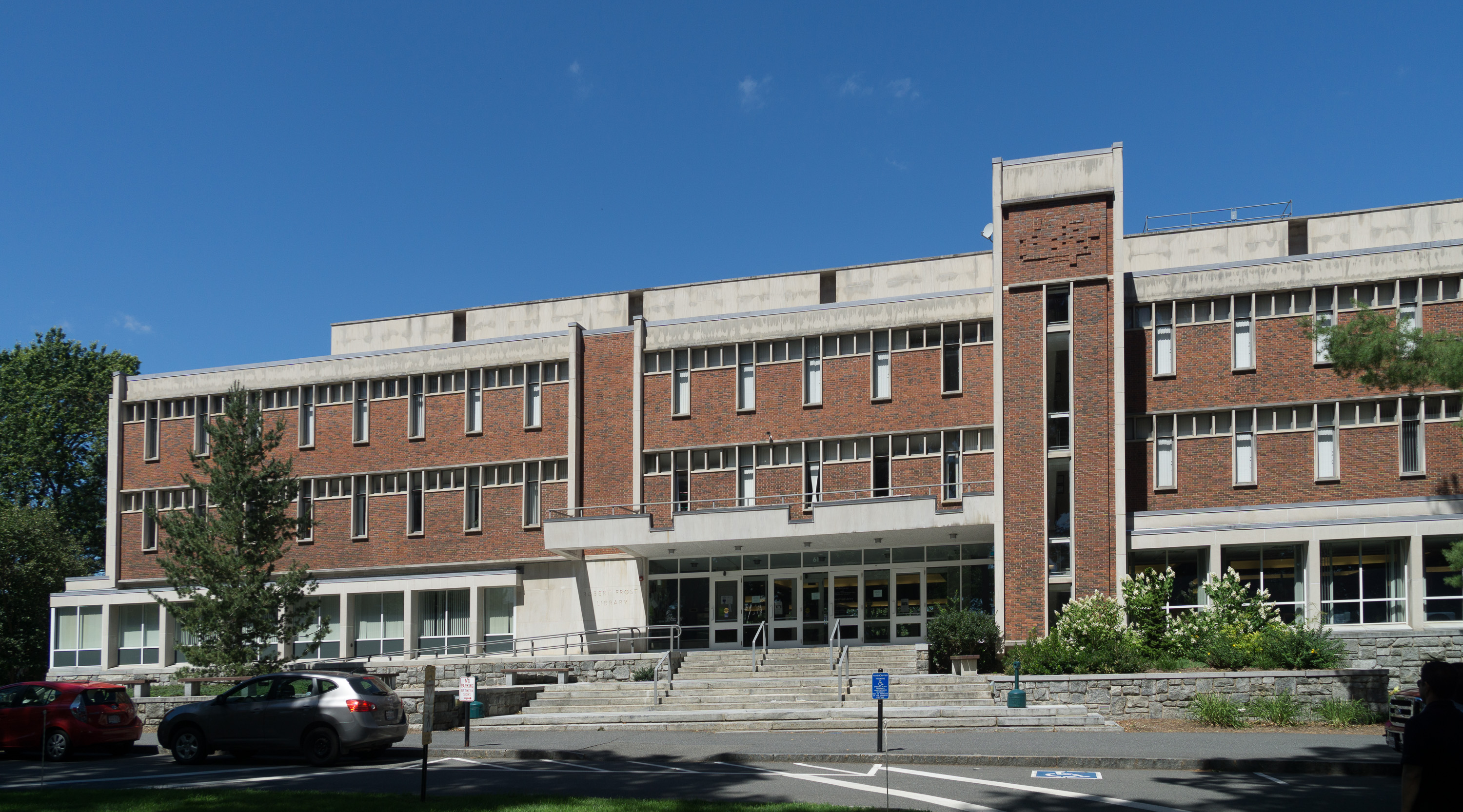
Frost Library

In 1812, funds were raised in Amherst for a secondary school, Amherst Academy; it opened December 1814. The academy incorporated in 1816, and eventually counted among its students Emily Dickinson, Sylvester Graham, and Mary Lyon (founder of Mount Holyoke College). The institution was named after the town, which in turn had been named after Jeffery, Lord Amherst, a veteran from the Seven Years' War and later commanding general of the British forces in North America. On November 18, 1817, a project was adopted at the Academy to raise funds for the free instruction of "indigent young men of promising talents and hopeful piety, who shall manifest a desire to obtain a liberal education with a sole view to the Christian ministry". This required a substantial investment from benefactors.

During the fundraising for the project, it became clear that without larger designs, it would be impossible to raise sufficient funds. This led the committee overseeing the project to conclude that a new institution should be created. On August 18, 1818, the Amherst Academy board of trustees accepted this conclusion and began building a new college.

Founded in 1821, Amherst College developed from Amherst Academy, first established as a secondary school. The college was originally suggested as an alternative to Williams College, which was struggling to stay open. Although Williams survived, Amherst was formed and developed as a distinct institution.

=== Establishment ===
Moore, then President of Williams College, however, still believed that Williamstown was an unsuitable location for a college. When Amherst College was established, he was elected its first president on May 8, 1821. At its opening, Amherst had forty-seven students. Fifteen of these had followed Moore from Williams College. Those fifteen represented about one-third of the total students at Amherst, and about one-fifth of the whole number in the three classes to which they belonged in Williams College. President Moore died on June 29, 1823, and was replaced with a Williams College trustee, Heman Humphrey.

Williams alumni are fond of an apocryphal story ascribing the removal of books from the Williams College library to Amherst College. In 1995, Williams president Harry C. Payne declared the story false, but many still nurture the legend.

In 1826, Edward Jones became Amherst's first Black graduate.

Amherst grew quickly, and for two years in the mid-1830s, it was the second largest college in the United States, behind Yale. In 1835, Amherst attempted to create a course of study parallel to the classical liberal arts education. This parallel course focused less on Greek and Latin, instead emphasizing contemporary English, French, and Spanish languages, chemistry, economics, etc. The parallel course did not take hold and replace the classical until the next century.

Amherst was founded as a non-sectarian institution "for the classical education of indigent young men of piety and talents for the Christian ministry" (Tyler, A History of Amherst College). One of the hallmarks of the new college was its Charity Fund, an early form of financial aid that paid the tuition of poorer students. Although officially non-denominational, Amherst was considered a religiously conservative institution with a strong connection to Calvinism; the Puritans still controlled much of Massachusetts life.

As a result, there was considerable debate in the Massachusetts government over whether the new college should receive an official charter from the state. A charter was not granted until February 21, 1825, as reflected on the Amherst seal. Religious conservatism persisted at Amherst until the mid-nineteenth century: students who consumed alcohol or played cards were subject to expulsion. A number of religious revivals were held at Amherst. Toward the end of the nineteenth century, however, the college began a transition toward secularism. This movement was considered to culminate in the 1949 demolition of the college church.

=== Development and academic reform ===
Academic hoods in the United States are traditionally lined with the official colors of the school, in theory so watchers can tell where the hood wearer earned his or her degree. Amherst's hoods are purple (Williams' official color) with a white stripe or chevron, said to signify that Amherst was born of Williams. Amherst records one of the first uses of Latin honors of any American college, dating back to 1881. The college was an all-male school until the late 1960s, when a few female students from nearby schools in the Four-College Consortium (Amherst, Mount Holyoke, Smith, UMass) attended on an experimental basis. In October 1974, the faculty voted in favor of coeducation and in November 1974, the board of trustees voted to admit female students starting in the 1975–1976 school year. This was done while John William Ward served as president. In 1975, nine women who were already attending classes as part of an inter-college exchange program were admitted as transfer students. In June 1976, they became the first female graduates of the college.

The college established the Black Studies Department in 1969. In 1973, it launched the nation's first undergraduate neuroscience program. In 1983, it established a Department of Asian Languages and Literatures, which was later to become the Department of Asian Languages and Civilizations.

In 1984, on-campus fraternities were abolished. The former fraternity buildings, which were owned by the college, were converted into residence halls. The Department of Women's and Gender Studies, which later became the Department of Sexuality, Women's, and Gender Studies, was established in 1987, and the Department of Law, Jurisprudence, and Social Thought in 1993.

In March 2013, the faculty adopted an open-access policy. Eight years later, the college ended its practice of legacy admissions and increased financial aid to increase access to low and middle-income students and diversify the college.

=== Presidents ===
The following persons have served as president of Amherst College:

No.	Image	President	Term start	Term end	Ref.
1		Zephaniah Swift Moore	1821	1823	
2		Heman Humphrey	1823	1845	
3		Edward Hitchcock	1845	1854	
4		William Augustus Stearns	1854	1876	
5		Julius Hawley Seelye	1876	1890	
6		Merrill Edwards Gates	1890	1899	
7		George Harris	1899	1912	
8		Alexander Meiklejohn	1912	1924	
9		George Daniel Olds	1924	1927	
10		Arthur Stanley Pease	1927	1932	
11		Stanley King	1932	1946	
12		Charles Woolsey Cole	1946	1960	
13		Calvin Hastings Plimpton	1960	1971	
14		John William Ward	1971	1979	
15		Julian Gibbs	1979	1983	
acting		G. Armour Craig	1983	1984	
16		Peter Pouncey	1984	1994	
17		Tom Gerety	July 1, 1994	June 30, 2003	
18		Anthony Marx	July 1, 2003	June 30, 2011 (Note: Resigned to lead New York Public Library.)	
acting		Gregory S. Call	July 1, 2011	July 31, 2011	
19		Carolyn "Biddy" Martin	August 1, 2011	July 31, 2022	
20		Michael A. Elliott	August 1, 2022	present	

Table notes:

== Campus ==
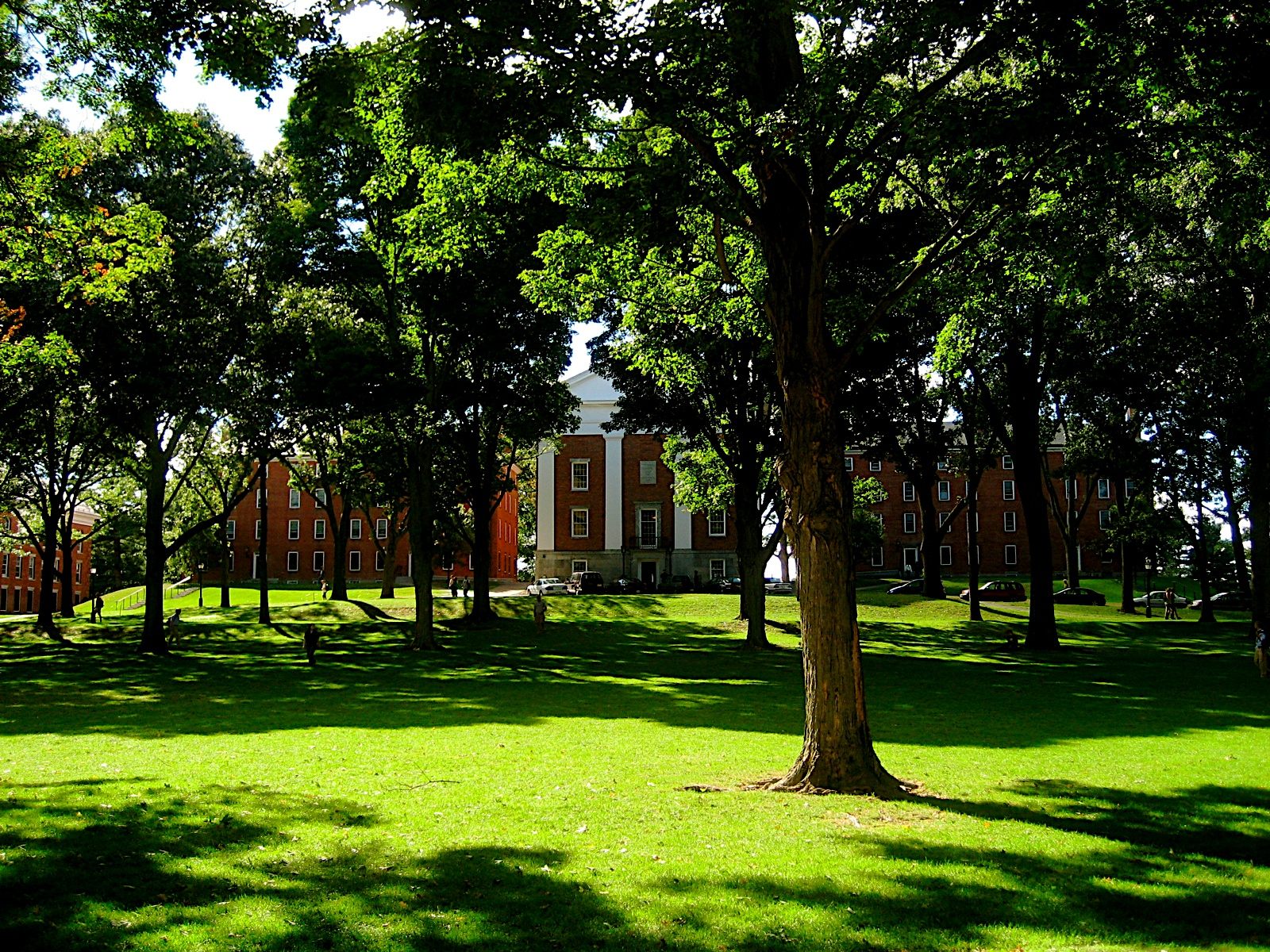
Main Quad

Amherst College is located in the town of Amherst in Western Massachusetts. Amherst College has a total of 34 residence halls, seven of which are strictly for first year students. Following their first year, sophomores, juniors, and seniors have the choice to live off campus and are offered options of Themed Houses including Arts House, Russian House, and French House, however this option is only available for two years of residence. First-year students are required to live on campus.

The college also owns the Emily Dickinson Museum, operated as a museum about the life and history of poet Emily Dickinson, and the Inn on Boltwood near to the main campus.

Noted landscape architect Adolph Strauch redesigned the campus grounds in 1865.

=== Sustainability ===
Amherst College is reducing its energy consumption through a computerized monitoring system for lighting and the use of an efficient cogeneration facility. The cogeneration facility features a gas turbine that generates electricity in addition to steam for heating the campus. Amherst also operates a composting program, in which a portion of the food waste from dining halls is sent to a farmer in Vermont.

== Academics ==
Amherst College offers 41 fields of study (with 850+ courses) in the sciences, arts, humanities, mathematics and computer sciences, social sciences, foreign languages, classics, and several interdisciplinary fields (including premedical studies) and provides an unusually open curriculum. Students are not required to study a core curriculum or fulfill any distribution requirements and may even design their own unique interdisciplinary major. Freshmen may take advanced courses, and seniors may take introductory ones. Amherst College is accredited by the New England Commission of Higher Education.

Forty-five percent of Amherst students in the class of 2019 were double majors. Amherst College has been the first college to have undergraduate departments in the interdisciplinary fields of American Studies; Law, Jurisprudence and Social Thought; and Neuroscience and has helped to pioneer other interdisciplinary programs, including Asian Languages and Civilizations. Its most popular majors, by 2021 graduates, were:

Mathematics (40)
Econometrics and Quantitative Economics (34)
Research and Experimental Psychology (31)
Political Science and Government (25)
History (22)
Biology/Biological Sciences (21)
Neuroscience (19)
American/U.S. Law/Legal Studies/Jurisprudence (19)

The Amherst library is named for long-time faculty member, poet Robert Frost. The student-faculty ratio is 7:1 and 84% of classes have fewer than 30 students.

Notable faculty members include, among others, modern literature and poetry critic William H. Pritchard, Beowulf translator Howell Chickering, Jewish and Latino studies scholar Ilan Stavans, novelist and legal scholar Lawrence Douglas, physicist Arthur Zajonc, Pulitzer Prize-winning Nikita Khrushchev biographer William Taubman, African art specialist Rowland Abiodun, Natural Law expert Hadley Arkes, Mathematician Daniel Velleman, Biblical scholar Susan Niditch, law and society expert Austin Sarat, Asian American studies scholar and former Director of the Smithsonian Asian Pacific American Center Franklin Odo, and Pulitzer Prize-winning composer Lewis Spratlan, professor emeritus of the music faculty.

=== Reputation and rankings ===
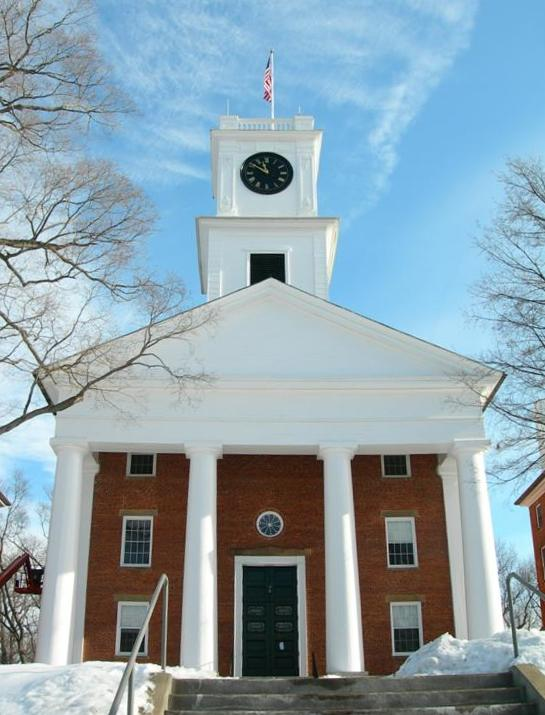
Johnson Chapel

Academic rankings

Liberal arts
- U.S. News & World Report: 2
- Washington Monthly: 6

National
- Forbes: 24
- WSJ/College Pulse: 8

Global
- ARWU: 801–900

Since the inception of the U.S. News & World Report rankings in 1987, Amherst College has been ranked ten times as the first overall among 266 liberal arts colleges in the United States, and in 2022 ranked second, behind Williams. In 2023, Amherst College was ranked as the best liberal arts college and 8th best college or university overall in the United States by The WSJ/College Pulse 2024 Best College Rankings. In 2022, Amherst was ranked as the best liberal arts college in the country by The Wall Street Journal. Forbes ranked Amherst College as the 24th best college or university in the United States for their 2024–25 rankings and the 16th best college or university in the United States in 2021.

Kiplinger's Personal Finance places Amherst 11th in its 2016 ranking of best value liberal arts colleges in the United States.

Amherst ranked 6th in the 2021 Washington Monthly liberal arts college rankings, which focus on contribution to the public good in three broad categories: social mobility, research, and promoting public service.

=== Academic freedom debate ===
The writings of Amherst College political science Professor Hadley Arkes about homosexuality led to a dispute in 2013 over whether a college seeking to create a diverse, respectful academic community should speak out when a faculty member disparages community members or should instead remain silent as a way to protect academic freedom. The issue arose when a group of alumni petitioned the college trustees and President Biddy Martin to "dissociate the institution" from Arkes's "divisive and destructive" views, focusing particularly on his May 2013 comparison of homosexuality to bestiality, pedophilia and necrophilia. The alumni said, "Amherst College cannot credibly maintain its professed commitment to be an inclusive community as long as it chooses to remain silent while a sitting professor disparages members of its community in media of worldwide circulation and accessibility."

Martin disagreed, citing past debates over the college's position on the Vietnam War and apartheid in South Africa—issues on which the college initially remained silent but eventually took a public position. In such times, she said, colleges should "avoid taking institutional positions on controversial political matters, except in extraordinary circumstances" and should simultaneously both "protect their communities from discrimination and disrespect" and "cherish a diversity of viewpoints".

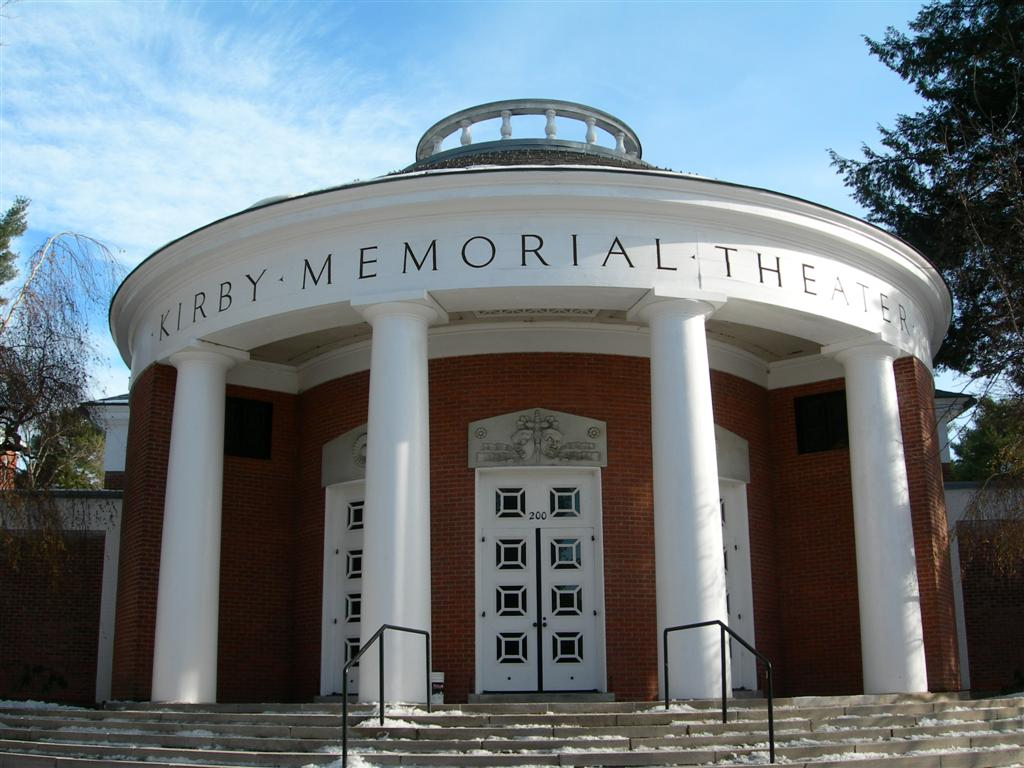
The Kirby Memorial Theater

=== Five College Consortium ===
Amherst is a member of the Five Colleges consortium, which allows its students to attend classes at four other Pioneer Valley institutions. These include Mount Holyoke College, Smith College, Hampshire College, and the University of Massachusetts Amherst. In addition to the 850 courses available on campus, Amherst students have an additional 5,300 classes to consider through the Consortium (without paying additional tuition) and access to 8 million library volumes. The Five Colleges are geographically close to one another and are linked by buses that run between the campuses.

The Five Colleges share resources and develop common academic programs. Museums10 is a consortium of local art, history and science museums. The Five College Dance Department is one of the largest in the nation. The joint Astronomy department shares use of the Five College Radio Astronomy Observatory, which contributed to work that won the 1993 Nobel Prize in Physics.

The Five College Coastal and Marine Sciences Program offers an interdisciplinary curriculum to undergraduates in the Five Colleges.

== Admissions ==
Admissions statistics
- 2025 entering class
- Admit rate: 7.72% (▼ −4.11)
- Yield rate: 39.7% (▲ +5.1)

Test scores middle 50%^{[i]}
- SAT EBRW: 730–770
- SAT Math: 730–790
- ACT Composite: 33–35

High school GPA^{[ii]}
- Top 10%: 88% (▲ +3)
- Top 25%: 96% ( no change)
- Top 50%: 100% ( no change)

U.S. News & World Report classifies Amherst as being "most selective" of liberal arts colleges in the United States; the Carnegie Foundation classifies Amherst as one of the "more selective" institutions whose first-year students' test scores places these institutions in roughly the top fifth of baccalaureate institutions. For the class first enrolled in fall 2025, Amherst received 15,819 applications and accepted 1,222 for a 7.7% acceptance rate. 485 students ultimately enrolled; 88% were in the top 10% of their high school classes, and the middle 50% scored between 1470 and 1540 on the SAT and between 33 and 35 on the ACT. 57.3% received financial aid and 21% were first-generation college students. In addition, 24 transfer students enrolled. All 50 states, D.C., Puerto Rico, and an additional 70 countries were reflected among the Amherst student body.

Despite its high cost of attendance – the comprehensive tuition, room, and board fee for the 2026–27 academic year was $96,360 – Amherst College meets the full demonstrated need of every admitted student. Roughly sixty percent of current students receive scholarship aid, and the average financial aid package award amounts to $84,590; college expenditures are approximately $140,000 per student each year.

In July 2007, Amherst announced that grants would replace loans in all financial aid packages beginning in the 2008–09 academic year. Amherst had already been the first school to eliminate loans for low-income students, and with this announcement it joined Princeton University, Cornell University and Davidson College, then the only colleges to eliminate loans from need-based financial aid packages. Increased rates of admission of highly qualified lower income students has resulted in greater equality of opportunity at Amherst than is usual at elite American colleges.

In the 2008–2009 academic year, Amherst College also extended its need-blind admission policy to international applicants. In 2021, it also eliminated preferences for students whose parents are alumni ("legacies").

== Student life ==
Amherst's resources, faculty, and academic life allow the college to enroll students with a range of talents, interests, and commitments. Students represent 48 states, the District of Columbia, Puerto Rico, and sixty-six countries. The median family income of Amherst students is $158,200, with 51% of students coming from the top 10% highest-earning families and 24% from the bottom 60%. Ninety-eight percent of students live on campus. Ninety-eight percent of Amherst freshmen enrolled in Fall 2020 returned for their sophomore year; ninety-two percent of the most recent cohort graduated within six years. There are more than 200 student groups at Amherst. More than a third of the student body are members of a varsity athletics team.

Students pursue their interests through student-led organizations funded by a student fee and distributed by the student government, including a variety of cultural and religious groups, publications, fine and performing arts and political advocacy and service groups. Groups include a medieval sword-fighting club, a knitting club, and a club devoted to random acts of kindness, among others. Community service groups and opportunities (locally—through the Center for Community Engagement, nationally, and internationally) have been a priority at Amherst and for former President Anthony Marx, who helped start a secondary school for black students in apartheid South Africa.

One of the longstanding traditions at the college involves the Sabrina statue. Even year and odd year classes battle for possession of the historic statue, often engaging in elaborate pranks in the process.

=== Sexual assault cases ===
In 2012, President Biddy Martin began a community-wide review of the sexual misconduct and disciplinary policies at the college. This review was sparked by several factors, including an underground fraternity's T-shirt design that critics alleged was misogynist and an essay by Angie Epifano published in The Amherst Student, wherein she accused the college of inappropriate handling of a case of sexual assault. In January 2013, a college committee published a report noting Amherst's rate of sexual assault as similar to other colleges and universities, and making recommendations to address the problem. In May 2014, the Amherst board of trustees banned students from joining any underground or off-campus fraternity.

After a complaint was filed by Epifano and an anonymous former student in November 2013, the US Department of Education opened an investigation into the college's handling of sexual violence and potential violations of Title IX. In May 2014, the Department of Education announced a list of 55 colleges and universities (including Amherst) currently under investigation.

A report from Amherst College stated that 2009 to 2011, Amherst reported 35 instances of "forcible sex offenses", a term that encompasses rape, attempted rape, and lesser forms of sexual contact.

In 2022, in response to the anonymous sharing of sexual assault experiences at Amherst College on the Instagram account @amherstshareyourstory, then President Biddy Martin announced the launch of a new comprehensive review of the issue of sexual misconduct and assault on campus. According to the 2023 NECHE Interim Crediting Report listening sessions and interviews were conducted, and a website for anonymous reporting of concerns was created. The NECHE interim report also suggested that the review was expected to be published in Spring 2023. However currently there has been no update or public disclosure of the 2022 review, and the original announcement page has now been made private.

=== Mascot ===
In the second decade of the 21st century, the original unofficial mascot of Amherst College, Lord Jeffery Amherst, became a cause of concern in the Amherst community. Many sought to separate the school from the problematic legacy of Lord Jeffery Amherst, in particular his advocacy of the use of biological warfare against Native Americans.

In May 2014, after a wild moose found its way onto the Amherst College campus and into the backyard of the house of the college president, students organized a Facebook campaign to change the mascot of the school to a moose. The page grew rapidly in popularity, receiving over 900 "likes" in under two weeks, and inspiring both a Twitter and Tumblr account for the newly proposed mascot. At the Commencement ceremony for the class of 2014, the moose mascot was mentioned by Biddy Martin in her address, and the Dining Hall served Moose Tracks ice cream in front of an ice sculpture of a moose.

In February 2015, discussion of a mascot change continued when the editorial board of the Amherst Student, the college's official student-run newspaper, came out in favor of "the moose-scot". In November 2015 the student body and the faculty overwhelmingly voted to vacate the mascot. That same month, several hundred students who staged a sit-in protest against racism at the college library included among their demands a call for the college to cease use of the Lord Jeff mascot. The decision to drop the mascot was made official by the college's trustees on January 26, 2016.

In April 2017, Amherst announced that their official mascot would be the mammoth. Mammoths beat the other finalists "Valley Hawks", "Purple and White", "Wolves", and "Fighting Poets" in a ranked-choice election process. The mammoth is linked to Amherst due to the long-standing presence of a Columbian Mammoth skeleton on display in the Beneski Museum of Natural History on campus, which dated back to the 1920s excavation of the skeleton by Amherst professor Frederic Brewster Loomis in Melbourne, Florida.

== Athletics ==
Men's sports	Women's sports
Baseball	Basketball
Basketball	Cross Country
Cross Country	Field Hockey
Football	Golf
Golf	Ice Hockey
Ice Hockey	Lacrosse
Lacrosse	Soccer
Soccer	Softball
Squash	Squash
Swimming & Diving	Swimming & Diving
Tennis	Tennis
Track & Field^{1}	Track & Field^{1}
	Volleyball
^{1} – includes both indoor and outdoor

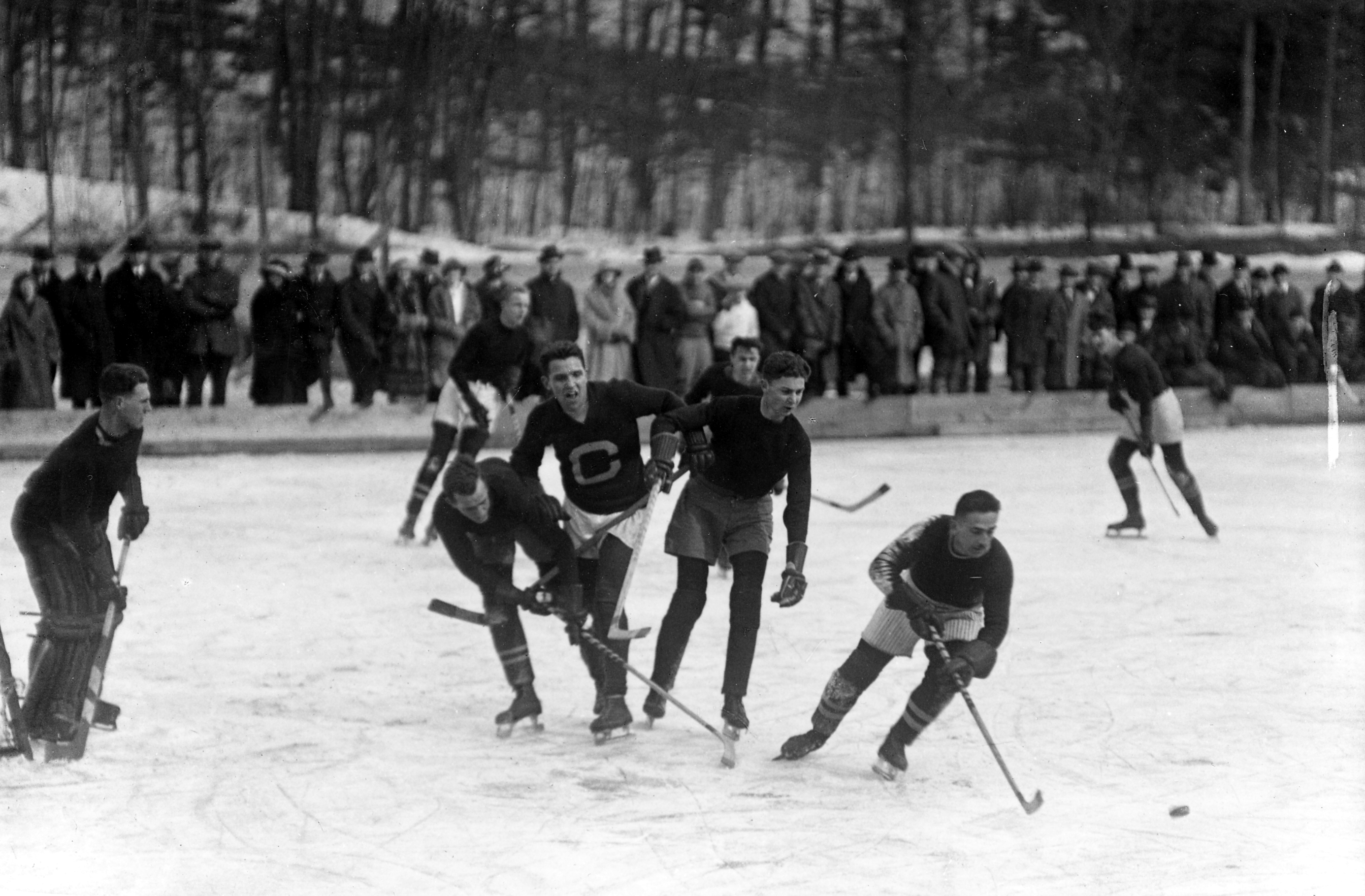
Amherst College "Lord Jeffs" vs Cornell ice hockey game on Beebe Lake, Ithaca (January 14, 1922)

Amherst participates in the NCAA's Division III, the Eastern College Athletic Conference, and the New England Small College Athletic Conference, which includes Bates, Bowdoin, Colby, Connecticut College, Hamilton, Middlebury, Trinity, Tufts, Wesleyan, and Williams. Amherst is also one of the "Little Three", along with Williams and Wesleyan. A Little Three champion is informally recognized by most teams based on the head-to-head records of the three schools, but three-way competitions are held in some of the sports.

Amherst claims its athletics program as the oldest in the nation, pointing to its compulsory physical fitness regimen put in place in 1860 (the mandate that all students participate in sports or pursue physical education has been discontinued). Amherst and Williams played the first college baseball game July 2, 1859.

Amherst's growing athletics program has been the subject of controversy in recent years due to dramatic contrasts between the racial and socioeconomic makeup of its student athletes and the rest of its student body, the clustering of athletes in particular academic departments, and a perceived "divide" on campus between varsity athletes and other students. Athletic skill plays a factor in the admissions decisions of between 28% and 35% of each incoming class.

Amherst fields several club athletic teams, including ultimate, soccer, crew, rugby union, water polo, equestrian, mountain biking, fencing, sailing and skiing. Intramural sports include soccer, tennis, golf, basketball, volleyball and softball.

The sport of Ultimate was started and named at Amherst College in the mid-1960s by Jared Kass.

== Alumni ==
Amherst alumni include Nobel, Crafoord Prize and Lasker Award laureates, MacArthur Fellowship and Pulitzer Prize winners, National Medal of Science and National Book Award recipients, and Academy, Tony, Grammy and Emmy Award winners; a U.S. President, the current Sovereign Prince of Monaco, two Prime Ministers and one Foreign Minister of Greece, a President of Kenya, a President of El Salvador, a Chief Justice of the United States, three Speakers of the U.S. House of Representatives, a U.S. Poet Laureate, the legal architect of Brown v. Board of Education and the inventor of the blood bank; as well as actors, architects, artists, astronauts, engineers, human rights activists, inventors, musicians, philanthropists, and writers.

Among its alumni, faculty and affiliates are six Nobel Prize laureates and twenty Rhodes Scholars. President Calvin Coolidge, Chief Justice Harlan F. Stone, and other notable writers, academics, politicians, entertainers, businesspeople, and activists have been graduates as well.

There are approximately 23,000 living alumni, of whom about 45% make a gift to Amherst each year—one of the highest alumni participation rates of any college in the country.

== Bibliography ==
- Applegate, Debby , The Most Famous Man in America: The Biography of Henry Ward Beecher (Doubleday, 2006).
- Opal, J. M. "The Making of the Victorian Campus: Teacher and Student at Amherst College, 1850-1880." History of Education Quarterly 42.3 (2002): 342–367.
- Pick, Nancy, and Frank Ward, Curious Footprints: Professor Hitchcock's Dinosaur Tracks & Other Natural History Treasures at Amherst College (Amherst College Press, 2006).
- W. S. Tyler, History of Amherst College during its first half century, 1821–1871 (C. W. Bryan, 1873).
- Exercises at the Semi-Centennial of Amherst College (1871).
- William S. Tyler, A History of Amherst College (1894).
- Passages of Time, Narratives in the History of Amherst College, edited and with several selections by Douglas C. Wilson, son of William E. Wilson (Amherst College Press, 2007).
- Pick, Nancy, Eye Mind Heart: A View of Amherst College at 200 (Amherst College, 2020).
