= List of Amherst College people =

This is a list of some notable people affiliated with Amherst College.

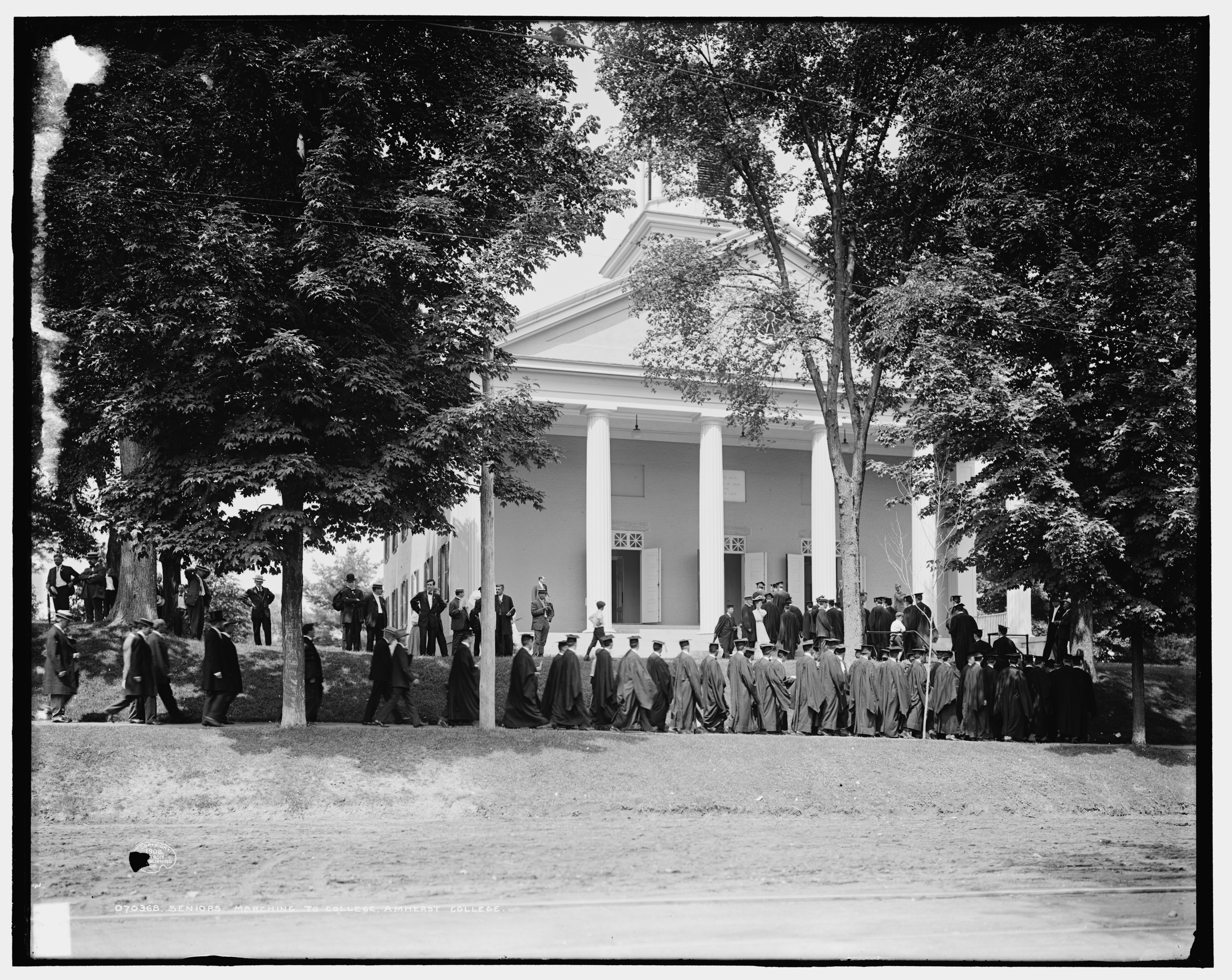
Seniors marching, Amherst College

== Notable alumni ==
=== College founders and presidents ===
- Edward Jones 1826, principal of forerunner of Fourah Bay College, Africa (the predecessor of the University of Sierra Leone)
- Patrick Hues Mell 1833, chancellor of the University of Georgia
- Edward Duffield Neill 1842, first chancellor, University of Minnesota, 1858–1861; founder, first president, and professor, Macalester College
- William S. Clark 1848, second president of the Massachusetts Agricultural College (now the University of Massachusetts Amherst), co-founder of Sapporo Agricultural College (now Hokkaido University) in Japan
- Julius Hawley Seelye 1849, fifth president of Amherst College (implemented the Latin honors system)
- Daniel Bliss 1852, reverend, founder and president of American University of Beirut (1866–1902)
- James Griswold Merrill, president of Fisk University (1901–1908)
- Francis Amasa Walker 1860, third president of MIT (1881–1897)
- George Harris 1866, seventh president of Amherst College
- William Jacob Holland 1869, fifth chancellor, University of Pittsburgh
- Joseph Hardy Neesima 1870, founder of Doshisha University in Japan
- Frank Johnson Goodnow 1879, third president of Johns Hopkins University
- Benjamin Rush Rhees 1883, third president of the University of Rochester (1900–1935)
- James Hayden Tufts 1884, acting president, vice president, dean, and professor, University of Chicago
- Frederic B. Pratt 1887, president of Pratt Institute (1893–1937)
- Bertrand Snell 1894, president of Clarkson University (1920–1945)
- Stanley King 1903, eleventh president of Amherst College
- J. Seelye Bixler 1916, 16th president of Colby College
- Lewis Williams Douglas 1916, ninth principal of McGill University
- Dexter Keezer 1918, president of Reed College
- Charles W. Cole 1927, twelfth president of Amherst College
- Richard Glenn Gettell 1933, thirteenth president of Mount Holyoke College
- David Truman 1935, fifteenth president of Mount Holyoke College
- John W. Atherton 1939, founding president of Pitzer College
- Calvin Plimpton 1939, thirteenth president of Amherst College; president of Downstate Medical Center and American University of Beirut
- Julian Gibbs 1947, fifteenth president of Amherst College
- Charles R. Longsworth 1951, president of Hampshire College, founding vice president
- Howard J. Burnett 1952, former president of Washington & Jefferson College, 1970–1998
- Richard M. Freeland 1963, president of Northeastern University (1996–2006)
- David K. Lewis 1964, interim president, provost and dean of faculty, professor, Connecticut College
- Colin Diver 1965, former president of Reed College
- Richard L. McCormick 1969, former president of Rutgers University; former president of the University of Washington, 1995–2002; vice chancellor and provost of the University of North Carolina at Chapel Hill
- Peter Dorman 1970, 15th president of American University of Beirut
- Alan Townsend 1988, current interim president of Colorado College

=== Academics ===
- Francis March 1845, philologist and lexicographer, principal founder of modern comparative linguistics in Anglo-Saxon
- Benjamin Kendall Emerson 1865, geologist, author, and professor
- John Burgess 1867, one of the founders of modern political science
- Herbert Baxter Adams 1872, historian, writings introduced scientific methods of investigation, credited with bringing study of politics into realm of social sciences
- Melvil Dewey 1874, librarian, of the Dewey Decimal System, founder of American Library Association
- John Bates Clark 1875, economist, namesake of the John Bates Clark Medal
- Richmond Mayo-Smith 1875, tatistician, at the time one of the foremost authorities on the subject
- David Peck Todd 1875, noted astronomer, leader of significant astronomical expeditions
- Frank Johnson Goodnow 1879, political scientist, scholar of public administration and administrative law, advisor in drafting Chinese constitution in 1913–14 (appears above)
- Ernest Cushing Richardson 1880, noted librarian, theologian and scholar
- Frederic Bancroft 1882, historian, author, librarian, namesake of the Bancroft Prize
- James Hayden Tufts 1884, philosopher, co-founder of University of Chicago School of Pragmatism
- Edmund B. Delabarre 1886, psychologist, pioneer in shape perception, among other fields
- Raymond Smith Dugan 1899, astronomer, discovered 16 asteroids (including 516 Amherstia), wrote standard two volume textbook
- Preserved Smith 1901, historian of Protestant Reformation; professor at Amherst, Harvard
- John Maurice Clark 1905, economist, best known forerunner of American school of pragmatic economics
- Claude Fuess 1905, noted author and historian, 10th headmaster of Phillips Academy, Andover, Massachusetts
- Scott Buchanan 1916, educator and philosopher, founder of Great Books program at St. John's College
- E. Merrill Root 1917, writer, educator, and opponent of communism and liberal intrusion into the educational system
- Robert Percy Barnes, 1921, chemist and professor at Howard University; was the first African American faculty member at Amherst College and the first African American person to receive a PhD in chemistry from Harvard University
- Gerald Warner Brace 1922, writer, educator, sailor and boat builder
- Talcott Parsons 1924, one of the most influential sociologists during much of the 20th century; professor at Harvard 1927–1973
- Paul Doughty Bartlett 1928, chemist, revolutionized the way organic chemistry is taught and practiced in the world
- Stephen Cole Kleene 1930, mathematician, helped lay foundations for theoretical computer science
- William Summer Johnson 1936, among the world's leading synthetic organic chemists
- H. Stuart Hughes 1937, American historian, professor, and activist
- John Whitney Hall 1939, historian, pioneer in field of Japanese studies, authority on pre-war Japan
- Richard P. Wilbur 1942, poet and professor, second U.S. Poet Laureate; Amherst College professor Robert Frost was Wilbur's teacher and mentor
- Eric P. Hamp 1942, LHD (hon.) '72, linguist and professor, University of Chicago, known for expertise in lesser-known Indo-European languages and dialects
- David Ferry 1946, poet and translator, recipient of the Bobbitt National Prize for Poetry
- Julian Howard Gibbs 1947, chemist, former president of Amherst College (won the High Polymer Prize of the American Physical Society, 1967)
- James Olds 1947, neuroscientist, one of the foremost psychologists of the twentieth century
- Richard Fenno 1948, political scientist, namesake of Fenno's paradox and Richard F. Fenno Jr. Prize
- Henry Way Kendall 1950, Physicist, experimental work provided first evidence of quarks and quark model
- Carl R. Woese 1950, microbiologist, redrew taxonomic tree, originator of RNA world hypothesis
- Andrew Hacker 1951, political scientist, novel interdisciplinary work on questions of race, class, and gender
- Peter Toennies 1952, physical chemist, former director of the Max Planck Institute for Flow Research; recipient, inter alia, of Physics Award of the Göttingen Academy of Sciences, Stern-Geriach Gold Medal (experimental physics), Kolos Medal (chemistry) (2005), and Benjamin Franklin Medal in Physics (2006)
- Robert Fagles 1955, translator and poet, known for translations of ancient Greek classics, particularly translations of epic poems of Homer
- Edmund Phelps 1955, economist, seminal work, natural rate of unemployment, Golden Rule savings rate
- Alan Schechter 1957, political scientist
- David Suzuki 1958, internationally honoured Canadian environmental scientist and activist
- John W. Dower 1959, historian, scholar of modern Japanese history, Bancroft Prize
- David Bradford 1960, economist, professor at Princeton University
- Andrew Ingersoll 1960, planetary scientist, recipient of Kuiper Prize (2007)
- James Boyd White 1960, philosopher and law professor, founder of "Law and Literature" movement
- John M. Deutch 1961, MIT Institute Professor, chairman of Chemistry Dept., dean of Science, provost
- Philip Gossett 1963, musicologist and musician, one of the world's leading authorities on 19th century Italian music; prof., Univ. of Chicago and Univ. of Rome
- Roger Tarpy 1963, psychologist, author of numerous textbooks on learning and memory
- Joseph E. Stiglitz 1964, economist, John Bates Clark Medal; former professor at Oxford, Yale, Stanford, and Princeton; work in the theory of markets with asymmetric information and efficiency wages
- Sterling Professor of French R. Howard Bloch 1965, Bibliotheque National, Ordre des Arts et des Lettres
- Robert W. Field 1965, physical chemist, recipient, inter alia, of the Broida Prize, Plyler Prize, Lippincott Award, and Nobel Laureate Signature Award
- Davison E. Soper 1965, physicist, recipient of the 2009 Sakurai Prize for Theoretical Particle Physics
- William Lycan 1966, philosopher, contributions to philosophy of language, mind, epistemology, linguistics
- Theodore Rosengarten 1966, historian, scholar of U.S. Southern history
- David S. Johnson 1967, computer scientist, head of Algorithms and Optimization Department (research) at AT&T Labs (former Bell Labs)
- Daniel Goleman 1968, bestselling author
- Loring Danforth 1971, anthropologist, award-winning scholar; pre-eminent expert, Macedonia naming dispute
- Peter Vitousek 1971, ecologist, professor of biology at Stanford University; member of the National Academy of Sciences (1992)
- David Helfand 1973, astronomer, chair of the department of Astronomy at Columbia University, co-director of Columbia Astrophysics Laboratory, professor in physics department
- Theodore Levin 1973, Ethnomusicologist
- Raymond Jeanloz 1975, geophysicist, earth and planetary scientist, and astronomer
- Peter Jelavich 1975, historian, professor of history, Johns Hopkins University, specializing in the cultural history of modern Germany
- Walter Johnson 1988, historian, Winthrop Professor of History, Harvard University
- Gilbert E. Metcalf 1975, economist, John DiBiaggio Professor of Citizenship and Public Service and professor of economics, Tufts University, specializing in taxation, energy, and climate policy
- Joshua M. Epstein 1976, mathematician and political scientist; pioneer in agent based models; modeling of social, economic, and biological systems; groundbreaking work on epidemics and bioterrorism
- Historian, author of books on the Vietnam War Christian Appy 1977
- Andrew R. Heinze 1977, historian
- Ezekiel J. Emanuel 1979, Bioethicist, leading medical ethicist
- Timothy Luehrman 1979, finance academic (corporate finance and real options)
- Rajiv Ratan 1981, scientist
- Andrew Kuchins 1981, political scientist and former president of American University of Central Asia
- Gabriel Finkelstein 1985, historian of science
- Amy Rosenzweig 1988, chemist, leader in advancing synchrotron-based protein crystallography
- Joseph M. Hall, Jr., 1991, professor of American History, Bates College
- Sumantra Bose 1992,pPolitical scientist, professor of Internatl. & Comp. Pol., London School of Economics
- Stephen Vladeck 2001, law professor and television correspondent
- Charles C. Eldredge, 1966, art historian, Hall Distinguished Professor of American Art and Culture Emeritus, University of Kansas
- Robert E. Ireland, 1951, organic chemist, professor of Chemistry at University of Michigan, California Institute of Technology and University of Virginia
- Kellie Jones 1981, professor of Art History and Archaeology in African-American Studies at Columbia University

=== Professional athletes and coaches ===
- Steve Partenheimer 1913, third baseman, Detroit Tigers, 1913
- Howard Groskloss 1930, infielder, Pittsburgh Pirates, 1930–1932
- Harry Dalton 1950, general manager Baltimore Orioles 1965–1971, Los Angeles Angels 1971–1977, Milwaukee Brewers 1977–1991
- Doug Swift 1970, linebacker, Miami Dolphins, 1970–1975
- Jean Fugett 1972, tight end, Dallas Cowboys 1972–1975, and Washington Redskins, 1976–1979
- Freddie Scott 1974, wide receiver, Baltimore Colts, 1974–77, and Detroit Lions 1978–1983
- Richard N. Thompson 1980, pitcher, Cleveland Indians, 1985, and Montreal Expos, 1989–1990
- John J. Cerutti 1982, pitcher, Toronto Blue Jays, 1985–1990, and Detroit Tigers, 1991
- Dave Jauss 1980, bench coach, New York Mets, 2009–present
- Dan Duquette, 1980, general manager, Montreal Expos 1991–1994, Boston Red Sox 1994–2002, Baltimore Orioles 2011–2018
- Neal Huntington 1991, general manager, Pittsburgh Pirates, 2007–2019
- Ben Cherington 1996, general manager, Boston Red Sox, 2011–2015
- Alex Bernstein 1997, offensive lineman, Baltimore Ravens, New York Jets, Cleveland Browns, Atlanta Falcons, 1997–2000
- Willy Workman (born 1990), American-Israeli basketball player for Hapoel Jerusalem in the Israeli Basketball Premier League

=== Clergy and Biblical scholars ===
- Isaac Grout Bliss 1844, missionary and linguist, translator of the Bible into Kurdish
- David Oliver Allen 1823, missionary and linguist, first American Protestant missionary appointed to Bombay, India; first translation of the Bible in the Marathi language
- Bela Bates Edwards 1824, biblical scholar, also editor-in-chief of Bibliotheca Sacra, the oldest continuous theological journal in the United States
- Elijah Coleman Bridgman 1826, scholar, first American Protestant missionary appointed to China, America's first "China expert"
- John H. Burt, Episcopal priest and eighth bishop of the Episcopal Diocese of Ohio (1967–1983)
- Justin Perkins 1829, missionary and linguist, first American Protestant missionary appointed to Iran
- Biblical scholar Horatio Balch Hackett 1830
- Preacher Henry Ward Beecher 1834
- Archbishop James Roosevelt Bayley ex 1835, eighth archbishop of Baltimore
- Roswell Dwight Hitchcock 1836, president of Union Theological Seminary (1880–87)
- Preacher Benjamin M. Palmer ex 1836, acclaimed orator, Bible-based theologian; confederate preacher
- Bishop Frederic Dan Huntington 1839, first Episcopal bishop of Episcopal Diocese of Central New York
- Biblical scholar Henry Preserved Smith 1869, professor at Amherst College (1897–1906)
- William Greenough Thayer 1885, Episcopal minister and headmaster of headmaster of St. Mark's School
- Christian thinker Uchimura Kanzo 1887, founder of Nonchurch Movement of Christianity in Japan
- Theologian Robert McAfee Brown 1943, Presbyterian minister, theologian, international leader and activist in social justice, civil rights, and ecumenical causes
- Canadian Anglican priest Roland de Corneille 1947, human rights activist
- Farzam Arbab 1964, member of the Universal House of Justice, the supreme governing body of the Baháʼí Faith
- Clark Lowenfield 1980, bishop of the Anglican Diocese of the Western Gulf Coast
- Buddhist scholar, teacher, and practitioner B. Alan Wallace 1987, translator for dozens of Tibetan lamas in India, Europe, and North America, including the Dalai Lama
- Jonathan Gold, D. T. Suzuki Professor in Buddhist Studies at Princeton University

=== Presidents, prime ministers, and other heads of national government ===
- Calvin Coolidge 1895, 30th president of the United States (1923–1929)
- George Papandreou 1975, former prime minister of Greece (2009–11) and minister for foreign affairs (1999–2004, 2009–10)
- Antonis Samaras 1974, former Prime Minister of Greece (2012–2015) and leader of New Democracy (2009–2015); minister for foreign affairs (1989–92)
- Uhuru Kenyatta 1985, 4th president of Kenya (2013–2022)
- Francisco Flores Pérez 1981, 39th president of El Salvador (1999–2004)

=== Royalty ===
- Albert II 1981, sovereign prince of Monaco (2005–)

=== Cabinet members ===
- Horace Maynard 1838, postmaster general, cabinet of Rutherford Hayes (prior to 1972, a cabinet office)
- Charles H. Allen 1869, assistant secretary of the Navy replacing Theodore Roosevelt in McKinley administration
- Robert Lansing 1886, United States secretary of state 1915–1920; nominal head, US Commission to the Paris Peace Conference
- William Henry Lewis 1892, first African-American appointed to a sub-cabinet position, assistant United States attorney general
- Harlan Fiske Stone 1894, United States attorney general
- Calvin Coolidge 1895, twenty-ninth vice president of the United States (1921–1923) (appears above)
- William F. Whiting 1896, secretary of commerce (1928–1929)
- Lewis W. Douglas 1916, director of the budget, now Office of Management and Budget
- John J. McCloy 1919, Assistant United States secretary of war (1941–1945)
- Amon Nikoi 1953, senior principal secretary of the Ministry of Finance; Minister of Finance and Economic Planning (Ghana)
- David Bradford 1960, former member of President's Council of Economic Advisors
- John M. Deutch 1960, U.S. director of Central Intelligence in Bill Clinton administration; U.S. deputy secretary of defense
- Joseph E. Stiglitz 1964, former member and chairman of the President's Council of Economic Advisors
- Antonis Samaras 1974, Greek leader of the opposition and president of New Democracy; minister for foreign affairs (1989–92)
- Francisco G. Flores 1981, former secretary of information; president of Congress (El Salvador) (appears above)
- Stavros Lambrinidis 1984, minister for foreign affairs of Greece (2011)
- Kevin McAleenan 1994, acting secretary of Homeland Security (2019)

=== United States Supreme Court ===
- Harlan Fiske Stone 1894, associate justice (1925–1941) and twelfth chief justice (1941–1946); the only justice physically to have filled all nine seats on the bench of the United States Supreme Court, having moved by seniority from the most junior associate justice to the most senior associate justice to the chief justice; principal role in upholding President Franklin D. Roosevelt's New Deal programs

=== Diplomats and government officials ===
- John Elliot Ward ex 1835, U.S. Minister to China, elected acting lieutenant governor of Georgia, U.S. attorney (GA)
- Horace Maynard 1838, Minister to Turkey in Administration of Ulysses S. Grant (appears above)
- Edward Duffield Neill 1842, consul to Dublin (appears above)
- John C. Caldwell 1855, Min. to Uruguay and Paraguay; con. to Valparaíso, Chile, and San José, Costa Rica
- Francis Amasa Walker 1860, chief of U.S. Bureau of Statistics, director of both 9th and 10th U.S. census
- Arthur Sherburne Hardy ex 1869, minister plenipotentiary (ambassador) to Persia, Greece, Romania, Serbia, Switzerland, and Spain
- Walter Wyman 1870, third surgeon general of the United States
- Frank C. Partridge 1882, solicitor of the Department of State; min. to Venezuela; con. general to Tangier, Morocco
- Sir Herbert Ames 1885, financial director, secretariat of the League of Nations (member of Parliament, Canada)
- Sir Chentung Liang-Cheng 1885, ambassador of China to the United States
- Dwight Morrow 1895, ambassador to Mexico, chairman of the Morrow Board
- Joseph Bartlett Eastman 1904, Interstate Commerce Commissioner (1919–1944); federal coordinator of Railroads
- Dr.Warren Fales Draper 1906, deputy surgeon general of the United States Public Health Service (see Physicians)
- Leland Olds 1912, chairman of the Federal Power Commission under President Franklin D. Roosevelt
- Lewis W. Douglas 1916, head, War Shipping Administration; ambassador to the United Kingdom
- John J. McCloy 1919, second president of the World Bank, member of the Warren Commission and Draper Committee (appears above)
- Robert H. Thayer 1922, minister to Romania, asst. secretary of state for ed. and cultural affairs
- George Yeh 1925, ambassador to the U.S. from the Republic of China (Taiwan)
- Charles W. Cole 1927, ambassador to Chile, director of the Federal Reserve Bank of Boston, president of Amherst College
- Toshikazu Kase 1927, Japan's first ambassador to the United Nations
- Philip Hall Coombs 1937, first assistant secretary of state for educational and cultural affairs
- Robert G. Neumann 1940 MA, ambassador to Afghanistan, Morocco, and Saudi Arabia
- Talcott Williams Seelye 1944, ambassador to Syria, Tunisia, Saudi Arabia; U.S. presidential envoy to Lebanon
- Edward Ney 1946, ambassador to Canada
- Harry G. Barnes, Jr. 1949, ambassador to Chile, India, and Romania
- Ulric Haynes 1952, ambassador to Algeria, staff member of the National Security Council
- Amon Nikoi 1953, permanent representative of Ghana to the United Nations; executive director of the International Monetary Fund; chairman and governor of the board of directors of the Bank of Ghana
- Hiroaki Fujii 1958, ambassador of Japan to Thailand, Great Britain (current president of the Japan Foundation)
- David Bradford 1960, deputy assistant secretary for tax policy, U.S. Department of the Treasury (appears above)
- Harold E. Varmus 1961, director of the National Institutes of Health (1993–2000)
- Joseph E. Stiglitz 1964, senior vice-president and chief economist of the World Bank (appears above)
- Kenneth Bacon 1966, Department of Defense spokesman who later served as president of Refugees International
- Eric Kriss 1971, former Massachusetts secretary for finance and administration
- David Kessler 1973, head of Food and Drug Administration (1990–1997)
- Bradley Campbell 1983, New Jersey commissioner, Department of Environmental Protection
- Jeff Bleich 1983, ambassador to Australia
- Sarah Bloom Raskin 1983, deputy secretary of the Treasury (2014–)
- Stavros Lambrinidis 1984, European Union special representative for Human Rights (2011–)
- Catherine Lhamon 1993, chair, U.S. Commission on Civil Rights; assistant secretary for civil rights, U.S. Department of Education

=== U.S. senators and representatives ===
- Edward Dickinson 1823, representative from Massachusetts, father of Emily
- Lincoln Clark 1825, representative from Iowa, Iowa state representative, attorney general of Alabama, Alabama state representative, and circuit judge
- James Humphrey 1831, representative from New York
- Nathan Belcher 1832, representative from Connecticut, state senator, and state representative
- Lucien Barbour 1837, representative from Indiana and U.S. attorney
- David Stuart 1838, representative from Michigan; brigadier general in the Civil War
- Horace Maynard 1838, representative from Tennessee, Tennessee attorney general, and US postmaster general (appears above)
- Samuel Clarke Pomeroy ex 1836–38, senator from Kansas, mayor of Atchison, Kansas, and Massachusetts state representative; railroad president
- Martin R. Thayer ex 1840, representative from Pennsylvania and state judge
- Charles Delano 1840, representative from Massachusetts
- Waldo Hutchins 1842, representative from New York
- Galusha A. Grow 1844, 24th speaker of the House of Representatives and representative from Pennsylvania; railroad president
- Samuel M. Arnell 1844 (?), representative from Tennessee
- Charles P. Thompson 1846, representative from Massachusetts and judge
- Julius H. Seelye 1849, representative from Massachusetts and president of Amherst College (appears above)
- William Whiting II 1862, representative from Massachusetts, state senator, and mayor of Holyoke, Massachusetts
- William Shadrach Knox 1865, representative from Massachusetts
- Francis W. Rockwell 1868, representative from Massachusetts, state senator, and state representative, and judge
- Charles H. Allen 1869, representative from Massachusetts and civil Governor of Puerto Rico (appears above)
- Caleb R. Layton 1873, representative from Delaware, secretary of state of Delaware, and physician
- Lewis Sperry 1873, representative from Connecticut, state representative, and lawyer
- Frederick H. Gillett 1874, senator from Massachusetts and 37th speaker of the House of Representatives
- Henry Stockbridge, Jr. 1877, representative from Maryland and Regent of the University of Maryland
- George H. Utter 1877, representative from Rhode Island
- George P. Lawrence 1880, representative from Massachusetts, state senator, and judge
- Frank C. Partridge 1882, senator from Vermont, state senator (appears above)
- Henry T. Rainey 1883, 40th speaker of the House of Representatives and Representative from Illinois
- Edward Bassett 1884, representative from New York; a founding father of modern-day urban planning
- Allen T. Treadway 1886, representative from Massachusetts; in office sixteen consecutive terms
- George B. Churchill 1889, representative from Massachusetts; professor at Amherst College
- John Buchanan Robinson, representative from Pennsylvania (1891–1897)
- Bertrand Snell 1894, representative from New York and House minority leader (appears above)
- Charles B. Law 1895, representative from New York
- Dwight Morrow 1895, senator from New Jersey and ambassador to Mexico (appears above)
- Albert E. Austin 1899, representative from Connecticut; physician and stepfather of Clare Boothe Luce
- Foster Waterman Stearns 1903, representative from New Hampshire; regent of the Smithsonian Institution
- Bruce Fairchild Barton 1907, representative from New York
- Lewis W. Douglas 1916, representative from Arizona and Director of the Budget; member of the Council on Foreign Relations (appears above)
- Augustus W. Bennet 1918, representative from New York
- Kingsley A. Taft 1925, senator from Ohio and chief justice of the Supreme Court of Ohio
- John Michael Murphy ex 1943, representative from New York
- Thomas Ballenger 1948, representative from Ohio; served consecutive terms, 1986–2005
- Thomas F. Eagleton 1950, senator from Missouri (1969–1987), Missouri attorney general, and Missouri lieutenant governor; one-time running mate of presidential candidate George McGovern
- Robert H. Steele 1960, representative from Connecticut (1970–1975)
- Thomas M. Davis III 1971, representative from Virginia
- Martin Hoke 1973, representative from Ohio (1993–1997)
- Chris Coons 1985, senator from Delaware

=== Governors and premiers, elected and appointed ===
- Alexander H. Bullock 1836, governor of Massachusetts (state legislator, judge, and mayor)
- Charles L. Robinson 1839 (?), first governor of Kansas (1861–1863), first elected "territorial Ggovernor" of Kansas (physician, abolitionist, and regent of the University of Kansas)
- Charles Bartlett Andrews 1858, governor of Connecticut
- Dave Freudenthal 1973, twice governor of Wyoming, former U.S. attorney
- Lucius F. C. Garvin 1862, twice governor of Rhode Island
- Charles H. Allen 1869, first civil governor of Puerto Rico (appears above)
- George H. Utter 1877, Rhode Island governor, lieutenant governor, and secretary of state
- Calvin Coolidge 1895, governor, lieutenant governor of Massachusetts (mayor) (appears above)
- John J. McCloy 1919, U.S. military governor and High Commissioner of Germany (appears above)
- William Henry Hastie 1925, first African-American civil governor of the U.S. Virgin Islands
- Adélard Godbout, Premier of Québec (1936; 1939–1944), majored in agronomy from the Amherst Agricultural College
- Uhuru Muigai Kenyatta (1985–1989), studied economics, political science and government at Amherst

=== Other politicians ===
- Edward Ralph May 1837 (did not graduate), Indiana state representative, sole delegate to the Indiana Constitutional Convention of 1850 to support African American suffrage
- John P. Sanderson 1839, member of Provisional Confederate Congress (Florida)
- Erastus G. Smith 1877(?), member of the Wisconsin State Assembly, mayor of Beloit, Wisconsin, and educator
- Sir Herbert Ames 1885, member of Parliament in Canada (appears above)
- Roland de Corneille 1947, member of Parliament in Canada (appears above)
- Richard W. DeKorte 1957 New Jersey, Energy Czar and former member and majority leader of the New Jersey General Assembly
- Paul Offner 1964 Wisconsin State Legislature, and educator
- Stephen Hartgen 1966, Idaho House of Representatives (2008–current) and former editor and publisher of the Times-News
- Alan Webber 1970, mayor of Santa Fe, New Mexico (appears below)
- Samuel I. Rosenberg 1972, member of the Maryland House of Delegates; law professor
- Peter Franchot 1973, Maryland comptroller and former member of the Maryland House of Delegates
- Antonis Samaras 1974, member of the European Parliament; former member of the Greek Parliament (appears above)
- George Papandreou 1975, member of the Greek Parliament; leader of PASOK, opposition party (appears above)
- Eric T. Schneiderman 1977, New York attorney general, former deputy minority leader
- Stavros Lambrinidis 1984, member and vice president of European Parliament (2004–2011) from Greece (appears above)
- Craig M. Johnson 1993, member of New York State Senate
- Rob Witwer 1993, member of Colorado House of Representatives
- Sean Reid 2019, member of Massachusetts House of Representatives
- Robert Plunkett 1998, member of the Vermont Senate

=== Lawyers and judges ===
- Henry M. Spofford 1845, justice, Louisiana Supreme Court
- Addison Brown ex 1852, U.S. District Court judge (New York) (one of the founders of N.Y. Botanical Gardens)
- Charles Bartlett Andrews 1858, chief justice of the Connecticut Supreme Court (appears above)
- Henry Stockbridge, Jr. 1877, judge, Maryland Court of Appeals (1911–1926) (appears above)
- Albert S. Bard 1888, lawyer and civic activist in New York City, Albert S. Bard Award is named after him
- William H. Lewis 1888, lawyer, assistant US attorney general; first college football player and All-American
- Luther Ely Smith 1894, lawyer and founder of Gateway Arch National Park
- Harlan Fiske Stone 1894, professor and Dean of Columbia Law School (appears above)
- John Teele Pratt 1896, lawyer, philanthropist, music impresario and financier
- Charles Hamilton Houston 1915, legal architect of school desegregation strategy; first African-American editor of the Harvard Law Review and first to receive SJD; Spingarn Medal
- John J. McCloy 1919, name partner in Milbank, Tweed, Hadley & McCloy; adviser of nine presidents
- James Focht McClure, Jr. 1913, U.S. District Court judge (Pennsylvania)
- Leonard Page Moore 1919, federal appellate judge (Second Circuit), 1957–1971; senior status, 1971; U.S. Attorney, 1953–1957
- Robert H. Thayer 1922, lawyer, naval officer and diplomat
- William Henry Hastie 1925, first African-American U.S. District Court judge (Virgin Islands); first black Federal appellate judge and Chief Judge (Third Circuit); dean of Howard University Law School; editor of the Harvard Law Review; Spingarn Medal
- Benjamin J. Davis Jr. 1925, African-American graduate of Harvard Law School, radical lawyer, member of New York City Council, and a communist who was jailed for his beliefs
- Kingsley A. Taft 1925, chief justice of the Ohio Supreme Court (appears above)
- Donald G. Murray 1934, plaintiff in Murray v. Pearson
- Nauman Scott 1934, U.S. District Court judge (Louisiana) (1970–2001)
- Robert M. Morgenthau 1941, district attorney of New York County and former U.S. attorney
- William H. Webster 1947, U.S. District Court judge (Missouri) and federal appellate judge (Eighth Circuit) (also U.S. attorney, 1960–1961; awarded National Security Medal and Presidential Medal of Freedom)
- Alexander M. Keith 1950, former chief justice of the Minnesota State Supreme Court; lieutenant governor of Minnesota
- James J. White 1956, leading scholar of commercial law, professor of Law at Michigan University
- Philip H. Lilienthal 1962, humanitarian and AIDS activist; founder of WorldCamps
- Peter Messitte 1963, U.S. District Court judge (Maryland)
- James T. Giles 1964, U.S. District Court judge (Pennsylvania), chief judge (1999–2006)
- Colin Diver 1965, former professor and Dean, University of Pennsylvania Law School (appears above)
- John C. Coffee 1966, professor, Columbia Law School
- William P. Alford 1970, professor and director of East Asian Legal Studies at Harvard Law School
- Samuel H. Mays 1970, U.S. District Court judge (Tennessee)
- William W. Fisher 1976, professor, Harvard Law School
- William J. Kayatta Jr. 1976, U.S. Court of Appeals judge
- Paul M. Smith 1976, winning attorney of Lawrence v. Texas (Supreme Court practitioner)
- Eric T. Schneiderman 1977, New York attorney general
- William Z. Stuart 1811-1876, justice of the Indiana Supreme Court
- Patrick Fitzgerald 1982, U.S. attorney; U.S. Dept. of Justice special counsel in charge of investigating the Valerie Plame affair
- Karin Immergut 1982, U.S. attorney
- Scott Kafker 1981, justice, Massachusetts Supreme Judicial Court
- Michael P. Shea 1989, U.S. District Court judge (Connecticut)

=== Businesspeople ===
- John Abele 1959, founder and director of Boston Scientific
- Frank Lusk Babbott 1878, jute merchant, art collector, patron, and philanthropist
- Bruce Fairchild Barton 1907, co-founder of precursor to BBDO, head of BBDO until 1961 (appears above)
- Clarence Birdseye ex 1910, food preservationist, founder of Birds Eye Foods, National Inventors Hall of Fame
- Charles R. Blyth 1905, investment banker, partner at Blyth, Eastman Dillon & Co.
- Charles Brewer 1981, entrepreneur and founder of Mindspring Enterprises, an internet service provider
- Benjamin P. Cherington 1996, vice president of player personnel for the Boston Red Sox
- Wei Christianson 1985 (BA political science), co-CEO Asia of Morgan Stanley
- Daniel Collamore Heath 1868, publisher, founder of D.C. Heath and Company, now part of Houghton Mifflin
- Harry Dalton 1950, executive of American Major League Baseball; general manager of three major league baseball teams
- Arthur Vining Davis 1888, president and chairman of Aluminum Company of America (Alcoa); founder of Arthur Vining Davis Foundations
- Daniel F. Duquette 1980, baseball executive; general manager of two major league baseball teams
- Henry Clay Folger 1879, Standard Oil president, Folger Shakespeare Library founder
- William E. Ford 1983, CEO of General Atlantic
- Martin S. Fox (1924–2020), publisher
- George N. Gillett, Jr., ex-chairman of Booth Creek Management Corp., owns interests in food industry and sports teams
- H. Irving Grousbeck 1956, current managing partner of the Boston Celtics, co-founder of Continental Cablevision, professor at Stanford Business School
- Amos Hostetter, Jr. 1958, former chief executive officer of MediaOne
- Neal Huntington 1991, general manager of the Pittsburgh Pirates
- Daniel Willis James 1863, head of Phelps, Dodge, and Company, philanthropist
- Jeff Jordan 1981, venture capitalist; partner at Andreessen Horowitz
- Eric Kriss 1971, co-founder of Bain Capital, former CEO of MediQual Systems (appears above)
- Thai Lee 1980, founder and CEO of SHI International, billionaire
- Richard LeFrak 1967, chairman and CEO of LeFrak
- Dave MacLennan 1981, CEO of Cargill
- John J. McCloy 1919, chairman of Chase Manhattan Bank, Council on Foreign Relations, and Ford Foundation
- Charles E. Merrill ex 1908, founder of Merrill Lynch
- John Middleton 1977, former owner of the John Middleton Co. and part owner of the Philadelphia Phillies of Major League Baseball (MLB)
- Dwight Morrow 1895, partner at J.P. Morgan & Co.
- Edward N. Ney 1946, CEO of Young & Rubicam
- Frits van Paasschen 1983, former CEO of Starwood Hotels & Resorts, Worldwide, Inc.; former CEO of Coors Brewing Company
- Charles Millard Pratt 1879, company secretary of Standard Oil
- George Dupont Pratt 1893, conservationist and philanthropist
- Harold I. Pratt 1899, oil industrialist
- Herbert L. Pratt 1895, head of Standard Oil
- Hugh B. Price 1963, former president of the National Urban League
- Lloyd Schermer 1950, CEO of Lee Enterprises; chairman of predecessor of the Newspaper Association of America
- Martin S. Schwartz 1967, Wall Street trader, author, profiled in national bestseller "Market Wizards"
- Gary Shilling, financial analyst and commentator
- Winthrop H. Smith, Jr. 1971, entrepreneur; CEO of Summit Ventures; former executive vice president of Merrill Lynch; member, Council on Foreign Relations
- Sung-Joo Kim 1981, chairman and CEO of MCM Group; founder and former director of Sung Joo International in South Korea
- John Tarnoff 1973, senior executive at DreamWorks Animation, head of Show Development
- Sigourney Thayer 1918, theatrical producer, World War I aviator, and poet
- Alan Webber 1970, former managing editor of the Harvard Business Review, co-founder of Fast Company
- Robert W. Wilson (philanthropist) 1946, hedge fund manager and philanthropist
- Sarah Meeker Jensen, 1977, FAIA, architect and medical planner

=== Directors of Central Intelligence (DCI), CIA, and the FBI ===
- John M. Deutch 1960 (1995–96)
- Stansfield Turner ex 1945 (1977–81) (president of U.S. Naval War College, 1972–74)
- William H. Webster 1947 (1987–91) (FBI Director, 1978–87)

=== Nobel Prize winners ===
- Henry W. Kendall 1950 (1990, Physics)
- Edmund Phelps 1955 (2006, Economics)
- Harold E. Varmus 1961 (1989, Physiology or Medicine)
- Joseph E. Stiglitz 1964 (2001, Economics)
- Jeffrey C. Hall 1967 (2017, Physiology or Medicine)

=== Crafoord Prize winners ===
- Carl R. Woese 1950 (2003, Microbiology)

=== Pulitzer Prize winners ===
- Alfred Friendly 1933 (1968, International Reporting)
- Richard P. Wilbur 1942 (1957, Poetry; 1989, Poetry) (U.S. Poet Laureate; National Book Award; Bollingen Prize; Ruth Lilly Poetry Prize; Edna St. Vincent Millay award; Frost Medal) (appears above)
- James I. Merrill 1947 (1977, Poetry) (twice named recipient of National Book Award, 1967 and 1979; National Book Critics Circle Award; Bollingen Prize; Bobbitt National Prize for Poetry)
- Tad Mosel 1947 (1961, Drama)
- William S. McFeely 1952 (1982, Biography) (Lincoln Prize)
- John W. Dower 1959 (2000, General Nonfiction) (National Book Award) (appears above)
- Walter Allen McDougall 1968 (1986, General Nonfiction)
- Blair Kamin 1979 (1999, Criticism)
- Richard Read 1980 (1999, Explanatory; 2001, Public Service (team))
- Debby Applegate 1989 (2007, Biography)

=== MacArthur Fellowship winners ===
- Carl R. Woese 1950, microbiologist
- Theodore Rosengarten 1966, historian; National Book Award; National Book Critics Circle Award
- Raymond Jeanloz 1975, geophysicist, earth and planetary scientist, and astronomer
- Kellie Jones 1981, art historian and curator
- Rosanne Haggerty 1982, leading creator of solutions to homelessness
- David Foster Wallace 1985, novelist
- Thomas W. Mitchell 1987, law professor
- Amy Rosenzweig 1988, chemist
- Andrea Dutton 1995, paleoclimatologist

=== National Medal of Science winners ===
- Paul Doughty Bartlett 1928, chemist
- Stephen Cole Kleene 1930, mathematician
- William Summer Johnson 1936, chemist
- Carl R. Woese 1950, microbiologist
- Harold E. Varmus 1961, physician

=== Astronauts ===
- Robert A. R. Parker 1958 (B.A., astronomy and physics; PhD, Caltech (Astronomy)); physicist
- Jeffrey A. Hoffman 1966 (B.A., astronomy; PhD, Harvard University (Astrophysics)); astrophysicist; mem. Spanish Academy of Engineering

=== Engineers, inventors, and scientists ===
- Alvan Wentworth Chapman 1830, botanist and physician, wrote the first comprehensive description of U.S flora beyond the northeast
- Amiel Weeks Whipple ex 1840, military engineer, surveyor of the First transcontinental railroad
- William Rutherford Mead 1867, engineer
- Arthur Sherburne Hardy ex 1869, engineer, professor of civil engineering and mathematics
- John Mason Clarke 1877, New York state paleontologist and geologist
- L. Hamilton McCormick 1881, inventor, scientist, and author
- Frank Lewis Nason 1882 A.B., 1885 M.A., mining engineer and writer; the mineral nasonite is named after him
- Hubert Lyman Clark 1892, zoologist, curator of echinoderms at Harvard, awarded Clark Medal
- Robert Stanley Breed 1898, biologist
- Clarence Birdseye ex 1910, father of frozen food, businessperson, National Inventors Hall of Fame
- Preston Bassett 1913, charter member of NASA; pioneer in instruments for aviation; inventor, engineer
- Alfred Romer 1917, paleontologist, a key figure in evolutionary research, professor at Chicago and Harvard
- Charles Drew 1926, M.D., developed system of separating liquid blood cells from solid plasma and storing and reconstituting them
- Melvin Kranzberg 1938, creator of Kranzberg's laws of technology; co-founder of Society for the History of Technology
- Walter Orr Roberts 1938, founding director of the National Center for Atmospheric Research
- Lloyd Conover 1947, chemist and inventor of tetracycline; National Inventors Hall of Fame
- Craig Call Black 1954, paleontologist
- Lewis Joel Greene 1955, American-Brazilian biochemist, Brazilian Order of Scientific Merit
- Steve Baer ex 1960 (studied physics and mathematics at Amherst), inventor of the postgeodesic system called the zome
- Jonathan Borden 1984, application of computer science to neurobiology; professor of neurosurgery
- Julie Segre 1987, epithelial biologist, chief of the Human Genome Research Institute
- Kellyn LaCour-Conant, biologist and restoration ecologist

=== Physicians ===
- Dr. Walter Wyman 1870, Surgeon General of the United States from 1891 to 1911 (appears above)
- Dr. James Ewing 1888, namesake of Ewing sarcoma; eminent experimental oncologist; helped found progenitor of the American Cancer Society; responsible for the creation of present-day Memorial Sloan Kettering Cancer Center in New York City
- Dr. Walter Childs Wood, 1886, chief surgeon at Brooklyn Hospital and professor of surgery at Long Island University; later a Connecticut state legislator
- Dr. Warren Fales Draper 1906, Deputy Surgeon General of the United States Public Health Service and member of General Dwight Eisenhower's staff in Europe during World War II; his medical care program for miners won the Lasker Group Award in 1956
- Dr. Charles R. Drew 1926, inventor of blood plasma preservation system, established first Red Cross blood bank, Spingarn Medal
- Dr. Lloyd Saxon Graham 1943, epidemiologist
- Dr. Mark Lawrence 1961, psychiatrist and CIA profiler
- Dr. Harold E. Varmus 1961, Nobel Prize for his studies of the nature and control of oncogenes; former Director of the National Institutes of Health
- Dr. David D. Burns 1964, influential psychotherapist, central role in the development of Cognitive Therapy
- Dr. James Kocsis 1964, professor of psychiatry at Weill Cornell Medical College and Payne Whitney Psychiatric Clinic
- Dr. Robert Yarchoan 1971, played a significant role in discovering and developing the first effective drugs for the treatment of AIDS
- Dr. David Kessler 1973 former Head of the Food and Drug Administration, former Dean of Yale School of Medicine, and former Dean and Vice Chancellor University of California, San Francisco
- Dr. Bruce D. Perry 1977, psychiatrist, internationally recognized authority on children in crisis
- Dr. Ezekiel J. Emanuel 1979, Diane and Robert Levy University Professor at the University of Pennsylvania; former Chair of the Department of Bioethics at NIH
- Dr. D. Drew Pinsky 1980, talk-show host

=== Entertainers ===
- Playwright Clyde Fitch 1886, distinguished dramatist, wrote over 60 plays
- Actor Emery B. Pottle 1899 (actor in 88 silent films and motion pictures)
- Actor Burgess Meredith 1931, Academy Award–nominated
- Actor Douglas Kennedy 1936, television and film actor, star of Steve Donovan, Western Marshal (1955–1956)
- Playwright Tad Mosel 1947 (New York Drama Critics Award) (appears above)
- Theater critic, director, playwright, author Robert Brustein 1947, founding director of Yale Repertory Theatre and American Repertory Theater; The New Republic, drama critic; Polk Award (1964)
- Oscar and Emmy Award–winning composer Fred Karlin 1958
- Musician and Grammy Award–winning music producer Jim Rooney 1960
- Actor Ken Howard 1966, a Tony Award– and Emmy Award–winning actor
- Actor Stephen Collins 1969, award-winning theater, television, and film actor
- Composer Jim Steinman 1969, songwriter and producer for Meat Loaf, Bonnie Tyler, and Celine Dion
- Magician Raymond J. Teller 1969, of Penn and Teller
- Writer and director Henry Bromell 1970, wrote, produced Chicago Hope, Northern Exposure
- Writer Robert Stuart Nathan 1970, wrote, produced ER, Law & Order
- Composer Mason Daring 1971
- Actor John Christopher Jones 1971
- Comedian and actor Lawrence J. Miller 1975, Max Keeble's Big Move, The Nutty Professor, 10 Things I Hate About You
- Writer and director Caroline Thompson 1978, screenplays for Edward Scissorhands, The Addams Family, The Secret Garden
- Director David O. Russell 1981E
- John Cerutti 1982, major-league baseball pitcher and broadcaster
- Writer and director Susannah Grant 1984, screenplays, Pocahontas, Ever After, Erin Brockovich
- Actor John Michael Higgins 1985
- Musician Jonatha Brooke Mallet 1985, singer-songwriter
- Musician Jennifer Kimball 1986, singer-songwriter, multi-instrumentalist
- Composer Harold Meltzer 1988, 2004 Rome Prize, 2004 Charles Ives Fellowship
- Actor Jeffrey Wright 1987, Tony Award–, Emmy Award–, and Golden Globe Award–winning actor
- Actor/Comedian Matt Besser 1989, founder of the Upright Citizens Brigade
- Actor John Cariani 1991, on Law & Order and in the musicals Something Rotten! and The Band's Visit
- Actress Sarah Goldberg 1996, on 7th Heaven and Judging Amy
- Composer Harris Wulfson 1996
- Actor Hamish Linklater 1998, on The New Adventures of Old Christine and American Dreams
- Actor Rob Brown 2006, on Coach Carter and Finding Forrester; lead role of Ernie Davis in The Express: The Ernie Davis Story
- Comedian, actress, and writer Aparna Nancherla 2005, on Totally Biased with W. Kamau Bell
- Podcaster David Chen, 2006, host and producer of /Film and The Tobolowsky Files
- Musician Tim Eriksen of folk-punk band Cordelia's Dad
- Actor and playwright Everett Glass
- Radio and TV show host Dr. Drew Pinsky
- Musician Chelsea Cutler, singer-songwriter, producer
- Actor and comedian Zach Cherry 2010

=== Authors and artists ===
- Jerome Allen 1851, author
- William J. C. Amend III 1984, FoxTrot cartoonist
- Edward Deming Andrews 1916, historian and leading authority on the Shakers
- Calvin Baker 1994, novelist, author of Naming the New World, Once Two Heroes, and Dominion
- Chris Bohjalian 1982, novelist; his novel Midwives was a Publishers Weekly best book and an Oprah Winfrey book club selection
- Thomas Boswell 1969, sports columnist
- Dan Brown 1986, author of The Da Vinci Code, novelist
- Rafael Campo 1987, poet, practising physician; professor of medicine, Harvard Medical School
- Dan Chiasson 1993, poet, recipient of the Pushcart Prize and a Whiting Writer's Award
- Sonya Clark 1989, artist and professor, United States Artists Fellow 2011, Pollock-Krasner Foundation Award 2006
- Harlan F. Coben 1984, novelist; first writer to receive an Edgar, a Shamus, and an Anthony Award
- Ted Conover 1983, journalist and author, National Book Critics Circle Award in Nonfiction (2000)
- Thomas Cornell 1959, painter and printmaker; Professor of Art at Bowdoin College
- Darby N. Conley 1994, Get Fuzzy cartoonist
- Walter Alden Dyer 1900, author and journalist
- Andre du Bouchet ex 1945, French poet, won "Prix national de poesie" (National Poetry Prize – France)
- Philip D. Eastman 1933, Children's author
- Thomas Flanagan 1945, writer, National Book Critics Circle Award (1979)
- Amy Fox 1997, playwright
- Jared French 1925, painter, master of magic realism
- Alfred Friendly 1933, journalist, managing editor of the Washington Post (appears above)
- Lauren Groff 2001, author, recipient of the Pushcart Prize and author of The Monsters of Templeton and Delicate Edible Birds
- Gilbert Hovey Grosvenor 1897, journalist, father of photojournalism; first full-time editor of National Geographic Magazine
- John S. Hagmann 1959, architect
- Charles Hallock 1854, author
- Jonathon Keats 1994, artist and author
- Jonathan Landman 1974, journalist, deputy managing editor of the New York Times
- Alan Lelchuk, novelist, visiting writer 1982–1984
- Michael Light 1986, photographer, creator of the books Full Moon and 100 Suns
- Tracye McQuirter, 1988, cookbook author and vegan activist
- George B. Mallon 1887, journalist; editor and writer for The Sun
- Joseph Moncure March 1920, poet and essayist, The Wild Party and The Set-Up
- William Rutherford Mead 1867, architect of McKim, Mead, and White (appears above)
- Stephen Mitchell 1964, Translator, anthologist, poet, and author
- Cullen Murphy 1974, editor of the Atlantic Monthly and writer, Prince Valiant comic strip
- Andrew Nagorski 1969, journalist, senior editor at Newsweek
- Catherine Newman, memoirist and novelist
- Warren Olney 1959, journalist, host, executive producer of PRI program To the Point; Emmy Award
- Graydon Parrish 1999, artist and realist painter
- Charles Patterson 1958, author and historian
- Fred Pfeil 1971, literary critic and novelist, O. Henry Award, New York Times "Notable Book of the Year"
- Nancy Pick 1983, coauthor of Do Plants Know Math?, winner of the Euler Book Prize
- Edward C. Potter ex 1882, sculptor of the New York Public Library Main Branch lions
- Julie Powell 1995, author
- Stephen Rodefer 1963, poet and painter, one of founders of the Language Poetry Movement
- Terry Rodgers 1969, painter
- John Ross 1979, novelist, Unintended Consequences, also the designer of a version of the Smith & Wesson .500 Magnum revolver
- J. G. Sandom 1978, novelist, writer of thrillers, mysteries; also founded first interactive advertising agency
- Kate Seelye 1984, journalist
- Walt Simonson 1968, comic book artist and writer, winner of multiple Shazam awards and 2010 Hero Initiative Lifetime Achievement Award
- Benjamin Eli Smith 1877, editor
- Margaret Stohl 1989, author of thirteen novels including Beautiful Creatures and many Marvel comics
- Wylie Sypher 1927, writer
- Aatish Taseer 2001, writer and journalist
- Scott F. Turow 1970, novelist, The Burden of Proof, Presumed Innocent; also a practising lawyer
- Carl Vigeland, author; associate secretary for public affairs 1978–1983
- David Foster Wallace 1985 (appears above), novelist
- Herbert Dickinson Ward 1884, author and journalist
- William Hayes Ward 1856, editor-in-chief of the New York Independent
- Bill Wasik 1996, author and editor at Wired, inventor of the flash mob
- Richard Wilbur 1942, poet, won two Pulitzer Prizes and was Poet Laureate of the United States (appears above)
- Dustin Thao 2018, New York Times best-selling author of You've Reached Sam and When Haru Was Here

=== Military ===
- Amiel Weeks Whipple ex 1840, Brigadier General, Brevet Major General, Civil War
- Edward Duffield Neill 1842, army and hospital chaplain in Union Army, Civil War; private secretary of presidents Abraham Lincoln and Andrew Johnson
- Francis Amasa Walker 1860, brevet brigadier general (II Corps, Army of the Potomac), Civil War
- Dwight W. Morrow 1895, chief civilian aide to General John J. Pershing, World War I
- Albert E. Austin 1899, regimental surgeon, World War I
- John J. McCloy 1919, U.S. Distinguished Service Medal; Legion of Honor (France); Sylvanus Thayer Award
- John Michael Murphy ex 1943, U.S. Distinguished Service Cross, Korean War
- Robert McAfee Brown 1943, United States Navy chaplain
- Stansfield Turner (ret) ex 1945, admiral, former commander-in-chief Allied Forces Southern Europe within NATO; commander U.S. forces in Japan and Korea; commander of U.S. Second Fleet
- Paul Rieckhoff 1998, served in the U.S. Army in Iraq War, nationally recognized authority on war in Iraq issues pertaining to troops, military families, and veterans; founder and executive director of IAVA; author of Chasing Ghosts

=== Other notables ===
- John Henry Boalt 1857, engineer, lawyer, and judge; namesake of the school of law (Boalt Hall) at the University of California, Berkeley
- William Estabrook Chancellor 1889, nemesis of Warren G. Harding
- Robert Billingham 1979, Olympic silver medalist in sailing (1988, Soling Class)
- Eric Britton 1960, political scientist and sustainability activist
- Don Cohan 1951, Olympic bronze medalist in sailing (1972, Dragon Class)
- Joseph Gallup Cochran 1842, American Presbyterian missionary to Qajar Iran
- Kelly Close 1990, diabetes patient advocate
- Ruth Davidon 1987, gold and silver medalist, 1994 Goodwill Games
- Orson Squire Fowler 1834, phrenologist
- Sylvester Graham ex 1827, reformer, temperance minister, and father of Graham crackers
- Jim Guest 1962, president, Consumers Union
- J. Franklin Jameson 1879, received first doctorate in history at Johns Hopkins University, instrumental in founding National Archives
- James Jordan 1952, best known for his work at BBDO advertising agency
- Theodore Levin 1973, ethnomusicologist
- Asa Lovejoy 1830 (?), Oregon pioneer; co-founder, city of Portland; mayor, Oregon City; speaker of house of Oregon Territorial Legislature
- Richmond Mayo-Smith 1875, economist
- Augustus Post 1895, founder of the American Automobile Association (AAA), early aviator, and American adventurer
- Jonathan D. Torrance, Amherst student who died in a class hazing accident in 1847
- William James Rolfe 1849, Shakespearean scholar
- Paul Rieckhoff 1998, executive director of Iraq and Afghanistan Veterans of America
- Kimmie Weeks 2005, global activist and humanitarian who founded Youth Action International
- Walter Zanger 1956, rabbi, tour guide and television personality

== Notable faculty ==
- Wande Abimbola, Scholar in Residence (Comparative Religious Ethics), in the early 1980s and 1990s
- Rowland Abiodun, prof. of Art, the History of Art, and Black Studies, 1997–present, distinguished author and historian of African Art
- Charles Baker Adams 1834, prof. of Astronomy, Zoology, and Natural Sciences, 1847–1853
- Hadley Arkes, prof. of Political Science since 1966
- Clarence Edwin Ayres, prof. of Economics, 1920–1923, principal thinker of the Texas school of institutional economics
- Theodore Baird, prof. of English, 1927–1969
- Elso Sterrenberg Barghoorn, prof. of Paleobotany and Paleontology, 1941–1946
- Amrita Basu, prof. of Political Science (South Asian politics, Women's Studies), 1981–1987, 1989–present
- David W. Blight, prof. of History, 1990–2003, winner of Bancroft Prize, Lincoln Prize
- George B. Churchill 1889, prof. of English Literature, 1898–1925
- Henry Steele Commager, prof. of History, 1956–1992
- Constance Congdon, Playwright-in-Residence, 1993–2018
- David A. Cox, prof. of Mathematics since 1979 (retired 2019)
- Benjamin DeMott, prof. of Humanities, 1950–1990, 1990–2005 (emeritus)
- Lawrence Douglas, prof. of Law, Jurisprudence and Social Thought since 1991, Andrew Carnegie Fellow
- Benjamin Kendall Emerson 1865, prof. of Geology, 1872–1917 (appears above)
- Robert Frost, prof. of English, 1916–1938, winner of four Pulitzer Prizes and the Bollingen Prize
- Norton Garfinkle, prof. of Economics and Economic History, c. 1957–1967
- Alexander George, prof. of Philosophy
- Edward Hitchcock, noted geologist and the third president of Amherst College (1845–1854)
- George Kateb, prof. of Political Science, 1957–1987
- Nicholas Kurti, former Distinguished Visiting Prof. of Physics, a leading experimental physicist in his era
- Anthony Lake, prof. of International Relations, 1981–1984, former National Security advisor
- Henry Littlefield, dean of students, football and wrestling coach, 1968–1976, known for his political interpretation of The Wonderful Wizard of Oz
- Archibald MacLeish, prof. of English, 1963–1967, winner of three Pulitzer Prizes; the National Book Award; the Bollingen Prize; an Academy Award (screenplay); Librarian of Congress; Presidential Medal of Freedom
- Jen Manion, prof. of History and Sexuality, Women's and Gender Studies, historian, author
- Jim Mauldon, Walker Professor of Mathematics (retired 1990)
- Roland Merullo, prof. of Creative Writing 2002–2003, novelist and memoirist
- Hermann J. Muller, prof. of Biology, 1940–1945, winner of the 1946 Nobel Prize in Physiology or Medicine
- Robert H. Romer, prof. of Physics, 1952–2001, American Physical Society fellow
- Austin Sarat, prof. of Political Science and Law, Jurisprudence and Social Thought since 1974
- Eric Sawyer, prof. of Music (composition and theory) since 2002, award-winning composer
- John Servos, prof. of History, past president of the History of Science Society
- Anita Shreve, prof. of Creative Writing in the 1990s, award-winning author of fiction and non-fiction
- Henry Preserved Smith 1869, prof. of Religion, 1897–1906
- Lewis Spratlan, prof. of Music, 1970–2006, 2006 (emeritus), winner of the 2000 Pulitzer Prize in music
- Ilan Stavans, prof. of Spanish since 1993
- William Taubman, prof. of Political Science; winner of the 2004 Pulitzer Prize in biography and the 2003 National Book Critics Circle Award in biography
- Robert Thurman, prof. of Religion, 1973–1988, selected by Time magazine as one of the 25 most influential Americans
- Ronald Tiersky, prof. of Political Science since 1973
- Jim Ostendarp, head football coach 1959–1991, president of the American Football Coaches Association 1982
- David Peck Todd 1875, Prof. of Astronomy, 1881–1917, 1917 (emeritus) (appears above)
- William Seymour Tyler, 1830, prof. of Latin, Greek, and Greek literature, 1836–1893
- Colston Warne, prof. of Economics, 1930–1969, co-founder of Consumers Union, and president of its board of directors 1936–1979
- Stark Young, prof. of English, 1915–1921, Order of the Crown of Italy
- Perez Zagorin, prof. of History, 1947–1949
