= You've Reached Sam =

2021 young adult novel

- Author: Dustin Thao
- Cover artist: Kerri Resnick
- Language: English
- Genre: Young adult romance
- Publisher: Wednesday Books
- Publication date: November 2, 2021
- Pages: 304
- ISBN: 978-1-250-76203-0

You've Reached Sam is a 2021 young adult novel by Vietnamese-American author Dustin Thao. The book received coverage from multiple independent publications, with reviewers noting its exploration of grief, teenage loss, and emotional healing.

The novel centers Julie Clarke, a high school senior whose life falls apart after the sudden death of her boyfriend Sam Obayashi. The book is part of a series called You’ve Reached Sam series with a subsequent book titled You’ve Found Oliver.

== Plot ==
Julie Clarke is a high school senior whose life is closely tied to her boyfriend, Sam Obayashi. They share a loving relationship and make plans for the future together. One day, Sam dies unexpectedly in a car accident while driving to pick her up. Devastated, Julie isolates herself from friends and family, avoids memorials, and discards Sam's belongings in an attempt to erase reminders of him.

In her grief, Julie calls Sam's old phone number, hoping only to hear his voicemail. To her shock, Sam answers and speaks to her as if he were alive. Neither fully understands the connection, but Julie begins using the calls to revisit memories, share her feelings, and ask questions she had never asked before. While comforting, the calls consume her attention, causing her to neglect friends, school, and family, and creating tension in her relationships.Julie is devastated by Sam's death, especially because he is killed in a car accident while driving to pick her up from the airport after a truck crashes into the driver's side of his car. Overwhelmed with guilt, she repeatedly wishes she had never asked him to come, believing that her call set the tragic events in motion.

Her grief deepens after learning from the police officer who discovered Sam that, despite his severe injuries, he had freed himself from the wreckage and walked nearly a mile in search of help before eventually succumbing to his injuries. The revelation that he fought so desperately to survive becomes one of the most haunting aspects of her loss.

Earlier that evening, Sam had forgotten to pick Julie up after becoming distracted at a bonfire. Frustrated, Julie called him, argued with him, and ended the conversation. When Sam tried calling her back several times afterward, she did not answer. Following his death, Julie is consumed by regret, replaying those final moments and wondering whether answering his calls might somehow have changed what happened. This guilt, together with her longing to hear his voice again, leads her to repeatedly call his phone, initially expecting only to hear his voicemail before the mysterious phone connection begins.

Julie's best friends, including Mika (Sam's cousin) and Oliver (Sam's best friend who deeply loved him), notice her withdrawal and express concern, but she prioritizes the calls over their attempts to reach her. She faces criticism from peers and struggles with guilt and denial over Sam's death, further complicating her grieving process.

Over time, Julie realizes that the calls, though comforting, prevent her from processing her grief and engaging with her life. She gradually reconnects with Mika, Oliver, and her family, sharing memories of Sam and participating in activities that honor him. She helps Sam's younger brother, James, cope with his own grief, and resumes responsibilities she had neglected, including work and writing.

Near the end of her senior year, following the graduation farewell party, Julie attempts to contact Sam one last time after her broken phone leaves her unable to reach him. She revisits several places that were meaningful to their relationship before eventually finding Sam's old phone, transferring her SIM card into it, and placing one final call. During their conversation, Julie accepts that she cannot continue holding on to him through guilt and longing. Instead, she chooses to cherish his memory while allowing herself to move forward with her life, bringing their extraordinary connection to a bittersweet conclusion. .They express their enduring love, and Sam asks her not to answer the next time he calls. When the final call comes, she keeps her promise even though it breaks her heart, and Sam leaves a voicemail she can revisit whenever she needs comfort. After this, Julie begins receiving messages and calls from her real life that she had missed, signaling her readiness to move forward.

During their final conversation, Julie and Sam say goodbye and acknowledge that they must let each other go. Julie resolves to continue living despite the future they had planned together being irrevocably changed, while Sam accepts that he cannot return to his life, complete his musical aspirations, or remain connected to Julie indefinitely. Their farewell emphasizes the novel's central themes of love, grief, acceptance, and the enduring impact of meaningful relationships.

The story ends with Julie taking steps to reintegrate into her life, attending college, continuing her friendships, and carrying her memories of Sam with her, while no longer relying on the supernatural connection to cope with his absence.She accepts that she was not admitted to her first-choice university and instead commits to attending the college where she was accepted. Julie also comes to terms with the fact that the future she had imagined with Sam—including leaving Ellensburg together and building a life with him—will never come to pass. Rather than remaining defined by her grief, she chooses to honor Sam's memory by continuing to live and embracing an uncertain future.

== Background ==
Dustin Thao said that the story isn't based on a true event or autobiography. He also revealed that the idea of You’ve Reached Sam (especially the concept of talking to someone you’ve lost) was something he'd carried with him for a long time and thought about deeply. He wrote the book during a period in his life when he had experienced loss himself, including the death of a close friend from high school. He has mentioned that revisiting old messages and voice recordings with that friend influenced his thinking about how people hold on to memories and voices after someone dies. Thao has noted that these personal experiences helped shape the emotional core of the story, even though the plot itself is fictional.

== Character ==
^{Julie Clarke}

^{The Protagonist of the novel, Julie, is a high school student who was considered cautious and goal-oriented. Following the death of her boyfriend, Sam, she struggles with grief and adjusting to her life. She learns to embrace change and accept her future.}

^{Sam Obayashi}

^{Julie's boyfriend, who was a young musician, died in a car accident before the set story. After his death, he communicates with Julie by phone. He helps lead her to overcome grief following his death.}

^{Mika Obayashi}

^{Sam's cousin and Julie's friend. While struggling with the grief of her cousin, she isolates herself from everyone. Until one phone call changed everything}

^{Oliver}

^{A side character who was Sam's best friend. He struggles with the death of Sam and works on building a relationship with Julie to help both him and her overcome Sam's death.}

^{Liam and Taylor}

^{Classmates of Sam's who become Antagonists toward Julie after Sam's death.}

^{Jay, Yuki, Rachel, and Tristan.}

^{Julie's friends who help her deal with the death of Sam. Each in their own ways. While Yuki helps explain how to deal with dreams, Tristan is seen as a possible love interest.}

== Reception ==
The novel received mixed to positive reviews.

American author and voice actress Alethea Kontis highlighted the novel's emotional sincerity and its handling of grief, noting its ability to convey loss in a manner accessible to younger audiences. She also praised the book's focus on emotional connection and healing, describing it as a story that prioritizes character emotion over plot complexity.

Amanda Nojadera, writing for Common Sense Media, praised the book's portrayal of grief and it's emotional accessibility for young adult readers, while noting its reliance on familiar genre tropes.

Kirkus Reviews described the novel as a narrative that “revolves around grief” and noted that while the central concept—the protagonist receiving phone calls from her deceased boyfriend—is intriguing, the execution sometimes felt uneven. The review remarked that the emotional impact of key events could be diminished by a steady, detailed focus on everyday moments, and that occasional time jumps were difficult to follow, but that the premise was likely to engage readers interested in themes of separation and loss.

School Library Journal observed that the book's exploration of grief is interesting but suggested that its slow pacing and episodic structure could make the story feel protracted. The review also highlighted the inclusion of cultural references and diverse secondary characters, noting that these were handled with sensitivity, though it remarked that the number of characters might have been challenging to manage effectively.
