= Charles C. Eldredge =

American art historian

- Born: Charles Child Eldredge; April 12, 1944 (age 82); Boston, Massachusetts, United States
- Occupations: Art historian Educator; Curator
- Spouse: Jane Allen MacDougal (m. 1966)
- Children: 2 (Henry and Janann)

Academic background
- Education: Amherst College; University of Minnesota
- Thesis: Georgia O'Keeffe: The Development of an American Modern (1971)
- Influences: Marilyn Stokstad

Academic work
- Discipline: Art history
- Sub-discipline: Nineteenth- and twentieth-century American art
- Institutions: University of Kansas; Smithsonian Institution
- Influenced: Elizabeth Broun

Charles "Charlie" Child Eldredge (born April 12, 1944, in Boston) is an American art historian, educator, and curator. Eldredge is the Hall Distinguished Professor of American Art and Culture Emeritus at the University of Kansas. He also served as Director of the Spencer Museum of Art and the Smithsonian American Art Museum during his career.

== Career ==
Eldredge was born to Henry and Priscilla Marion Bateson in Boston, but was raised in East Greenwich, Rhode Island. Eldredge received a Bachelor of Arts in American Studies from Amherst College in 1966, and then continued on to earn a Doctor of Philosophy in Art History from the University of Minnesota in 1971. His doctoral dissertation was on the artist Georgia O'Keeffe, whom he studied throughout his career, and was titled "Georgia O'Keeffe: The Development of an American Modern."

In 1970, while still a doctoral student, Eldredge was hired as assistant professor of Art History at the University of Kansas, which also came with a joint appointment as curator at their Spencer Museum of Art. Upon completing his doctorate, he was elevated to the rank of Professor, as well as to Director of the Spencer. Eldredge held those posts until 1982 when he left Kansas to become Director of the Smithsonian American Art Museum. In 1988, Eldredge returned to the University of Kansas as Hall Distinguished Professor of American Art and Culture. He remained in that position until retirement in 2018, and was given the title as emeritus.

In 1989, the Smithsonian Institution named an annual award for outstanding scholarship in the field of American art after Eldredge. The award is called the "Charles C. Eldredge Prize." Eldredge has also been named an honorary member of the Association of Art Museum Directors (1990) and Phi Beta Kappa (2004).

Eldredge's research focuses on American art from the nineteenth and twentieth centuries, with interests in museums, literary and social history, and more recently, the art of Arthur Bowen Davies. In addition to O'Keeffe, Eldredge has written books on such artists as John Steuart Curry, Arthur Dove, Marsden Hartley, Rex Slinkard, and Charles Walter Stetson.

== See also ==
- List of Amherst College people
- List of people from Boston
- List of University of Kansas people
- List of University of Minnesota people
