= Hadley Arkes =

American conservative political scientist

Hadley P. Arkes
- Arkes in 2021
- Born: 1940 (age 85–86)
- Education: University of Illinois (BA); University of Chicago (PhD)
- Occupations: Political Scientist, Professor
- Years active: 1966–present
- Employer(s): James Wilson Institute on Natural Rights & the American Founding
- Known for: Natural law advocacy

Hadley P. Arkes (born 1940) is an American political scientist and the Edward N. Ney Professor of Jurisprudence and American Institutions Emeritus at Amherst College, where he has taught since 1966. He is currently the founder and director of the James Wilson Institute on Natural Rights & the American Founding in Washington, D.C.

== Early life and education ==
Arkes grew up in Chicago. Until his immediate family moved to an apartment elsewhere in Chicago in 1944, Arkes lived with his grandparents, parents, aunts, and uncles.

Arkes received a B.A. degree at the University of Illinois and a Ph.D. from the University of Chicago, where he was a student of Leo Strauss.

== Teaching ==
Arkes started teaching at Amherst College in 1966, earning the title of the Edward Ney Professor of Jurisprudence in 1987. He assumed emeritus status in 2016.

== Writing ==
=== Books ===
In a series of books and articles dating from the mid-1980s, Arkes has written on a priori moral principles and advocated for their impact on constitutional interpretation. He has also dealt with their relation to constitutional jurisprudence and natural law, and their challenge to moral relativism. His works draw on political philosophers from Aristotle through the U.S. Founding Fathers, Lincoln, and contemporary authors and jurists.

John O. McGinnis, reviewing Arkes's Constitutional Illusions & Anchoring Truths in The Wall Street Journal, writes that it tries to find a path between the position of originalism, where the meaning of the U.S. Constitution is defined by its original text, and the idea of the living constitution, where its meaning is interpreted through the lens of evolving social attitudes.

In The Philosopher in the City (1981), Arkes introduced the idea, taken from the Founders, that law should be a teacher of virtue and not just a regulator of vice. Republican virtue, Arkes wrote, presented the solution to the interconnected problems of racial integration, free speech, and urban crime. Arkes also sharply criticized libertarian philosophy as simplistic and morally obtuse.

First Things (1986) was the first of Arkes's many contributions to legal philosophy, in which he argued for a jurisprudence based in Lincoln's understanding of natural law and contrasted it with positive rights such as the "right to privacy" which underpins pro-abortion arguments. Arkes returned to this theme in a later book, Natural Rights and the Right to Choose (2002), and elaborated on the moral and legal confusion which he believes was the philosophical legacy of Roe v. Wade. Michael Uhlmann wrote in a review of that book, “Arkes would be the first to acknowledge that his take on particular cases and controversies can be reasonably disputed, but he brings to the table of constitutional discourse a long missing and badly needed element—the recognition that the text of the Constitution rests on a particular kind of moral reasoning that conservatives ignore at their peril, and at the peril of the very rights they seek to protect."

In 1992, Arkes wrote Beyond the Constitution, a reevaluation of originalism. Arkes questioned the conservative argument that a purely textualist approach to the enumerated rights found in the Bill of Rights would be sufficient to check the advance of legal positivism. Reviewers praised Arkes’s breadth of knowledge, wit, and concision.

Arkes’s next book, The Return of George Sutherland, was an intellectual history of Supreme Court Justice George Sutherland. Steven J. Eagle reviewed Arkes’s successful defense of Sutherland in the Wall Street Journal, writing, “Advocating that the Supreme Court again espouse natural-rights jurisprudence is an ambitious undertaking, as is attempting to rehabilitate the Supreme Court justice who, for many, personifies the ideas behind substantive due process. Hadley Arkes accomplishes both tasks with rhetorical skill and intellectual tenacity.”

=== Articles ===
Among Arkes's most well-known articles have been his 1974 Supreme Court Review entry titled Civility and the Restriction of Speech: Rediscovering the Defamation of Groups, his 1996 addition to the First Things symposium on The End of Democracy? The Judicial Usurpation of Politics, and the 2013 publication in the Harvard Journal of Law & Public Policy of The Natural Law Challenge, his adapted remarks from the Fifth Annual Rosenkranz Debate at the 2012 Federalist Society National Lawyers Convention.

In 2021, Arkes co-authored the influential manifesto "A Better Originalism" with lawyer and writer Josh Hammer, Matthew Peterson, and Garrett Snedeker. The manifesto argues for "a bolder, more robust jurisprudence rooted in the principles and practices of American constitutionalism.

=== Awards and Honorifics ===
Arkes has delivered the commencement addresses at Seton Hall University as well as Hillsdale College.

In 2025, he received the third Leadership and the Law Award from the James Wilson Institute. He also received the Benedict Leadership Award from Belmont Abbey College in 2025.

=== Boards ===
Arkes serves on the advisory board and writes for First Things, an ecumenical journal that focuses on encouraging a "religiously informed public philosophy for the ordering of society." Arkes also serves on the advisory boards of Americans United for Life, the Catholic League, the Catholic Bar Association, and St. Augustine's Press. Arkes served on the board of trustees of the National Center on Sexual Exploitation.

=== Born-Alive Infants' Protection Act ===
Arkes co-created and advocated for the Born-Alive Infants' Protection Act. He first gave his proposal to George H.W. Bush in 1988, clarifying that his bill was only the first of many steps to protect life, giving abortion survivors protection under the law. Fourteen years later, on August 5, 2002, his son, President George W. Bush signed the bill into law, with Arkes by his side.

== Religion ==
In 2010, Arkes converted to Catholicism, which he described as a fulfillment of his previous Jewish faith.

== Legacy ==
Arkes was a founder and member of the Committee for the American Founding, a group of Amherst alumni and students who sought to preserve the doctrines of "natural rights" exposited by some American Founders and Lincoln through the Colloquium on the American Founding at Amherst and in Washington, D.C. When the Committee for the American Founding became defunct, Arkes took the same principles and founded the James Wilson Institute, a nonprofit organization in Alexandria, Virginia. The Institute unites law students and lawyers from across the country in promoting natural rights.

In September 2016, Arkes was among 125 Conservatives for Trump who announced they supported Donald Trump's candidacy to be president.

== Selected publications ==
- Bureaucracy, Regime and Presumption: The National Interests on the Marshall Plan (dissertation: University of Chicago, 1967).
- The Philosopher in the City (Princeton University Press, 1981).
- First Things: An Inquiry into the First Principles of Morals and Justice (Princeton University Press, 1986).
- On Natural Rights: Speaking Prose All Our Lives (Heritage Foundation, 1992).
- A Jurisprudence of Natural Rights: How an Earlier Generation of Judges Did It (Heritage Foundation, 1992).
- Beyond the Constitution (Princeton University Press, 1992).
- The Return of George Sutherland: Restoring a Jurisprudence of Natural Rights (Princeton University Press, 1997).
- The Mission of the Military and the Question of "The Regime" (Colorado Springs, CO: United States Air Force Academy, 1997).
- Natural Rights and the Right to Choose (Cambridge University Press, 2002).
- Constitutional Illusions and Anchoring Truths : The Touchstone of the Natural Law (Cambridge University Press, 2010).
- A Natural Law Manifesto or an Appeal from the Old Jurisprudence to the New (Notre Dame Law Review, 2013).
- Mere Natural Law: Originalism and the Anchoring Truths of the Constitution (Regnery Gateway, 2023).

== See also ==
- List of Amherst College people
