= Fenno's paradox =

Paradox in American politics

Fenno's paradox is the idea that people generally disapprove of the United States Congress as a whole but often support the congressmen from their own congressional districts. The paradox is named after political scientist Richard Fenno, who discussed this phenomenon in his 1978 book Home Style: House Members in Their Districts. Fenno claimed that congressmen would often run against Congress.

Fenno's paradox has also been applied to areas other than politics, such as the public school system. For example, U.S. citizens on the whole disapprove of the public school system but tend to approve of the particular local schools their children attend.

Fenno's paradox also refers to the paradoxical phenomenon by which individual members of Congress tend to have higher approval ratings among their constituents compared to the overall approval rating of Congress as a whole. This discrepancy is often attributed to the advantages of incumbency, which include increased visibility, personal connections with constituents, and the ability to deliver benefits to their districts. The paradox highlights the complex relationship between public opinion and electoral outcomes in representative democracies.
