= Kelly Close =

American diabetes advocate, writer, and founder of The diaTribe Foundation

- Born: Kelly L. Close; December 1967 (age 58–59); United States
- Education: Amherst College; Harvard Business School
- Occupations: Writer, speaker, diabetes advocate
- Known for: Public speaking, diabetes advocacy

Kelly L. Close (born December 1967) is an American writer, speaker, and advocate for people with diabetes.

Close was diagnosed with type 1 diabetes at age 18. She received a BA in English and Economics from Amherst College in 1990 and an MBA from Harvard Business School in 1995. She began her career as an analyst at Goldman Sachs and later served as a management consultant at McKinsey & Company. In 2002, she founded Close Concerns in San Francisco, CA. That year, the company launched a monthly electronic diabetes business newsletter called Diabetes Close Up, a publication that covers 40 conferences per year in 10 countries, and tracks over 100 companies in diabetes and obesity. In 2006 the company launched a newsletter for diabetes patients called diaTribe. To date, she remains the Editor-in-Chief of both newsletters. She has also contributed to About.com's diabetes site.

Close was recognized in 2012 by the American Diabetes Association with the Excellence in Health Communications award. She is on the board of directors of Diabetes Hands Foundation and Behavioral Diabetes Institute and was previously on the executive board of the SF Bay Area JDRF. She is a member of the Healthcare Council of GLG Research.
