= Richmond Mayo-Smith =

American economist

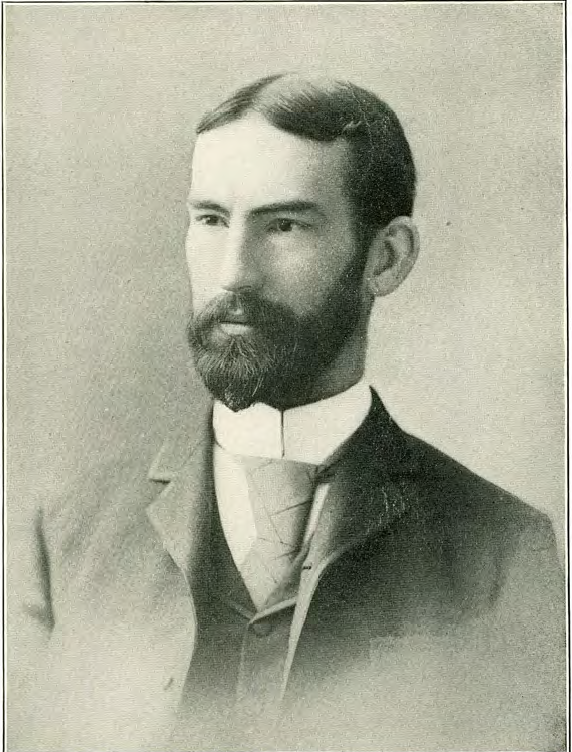
Richmond Mayo-Smith

Richmond Mayo-Smith (February 9, 1854 – November 11, 1901) was an American economist noted for his work in statistics. He was born in Troy, Ohio, educated at Amherst College (graduating in 1875), then at Berlin and Heidelberg University. He became assistant professor of economics at Columbia University in 1877. He was an adjunct professor from 1878 to 1883, when he was appointed professor of political economy and social science, a post which he held until his death in 1901.

He devoted himself especially to the study of statistics, and was recognized as one of the foremost authorities on the subject. His works include Emigration and Immigration (1890); Sociology and Statistics (1895), and Statistics and Economics (1899).

== Bibliography ==
- Richmond Mayo-Smith (1890). Emigration and Immigration: A Study in Social Science. C. Scribner's sons.
- Richmond Mayo-Smith (1895). Science of Statistics: Statistics and Sociology. Macmillan.
- Richmond Mayo-Smith (1899). Science of Statistics: Statistics and Economics. Macmillan.
- "Richmond Mayo-Smith". JSTOR.
