= William Hayes Ward =

American theologian and orientalist (1835–1916)

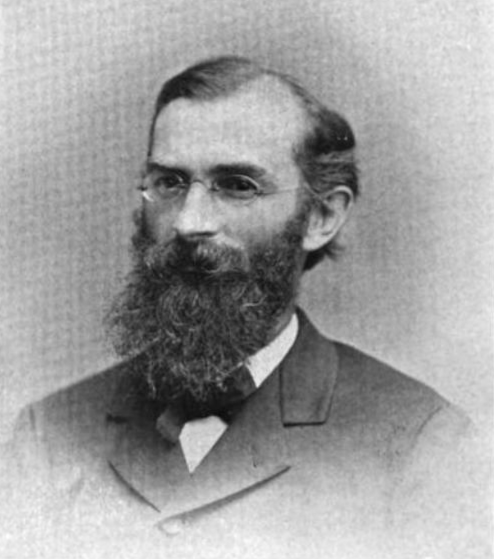
- Born: June 25, 1835; Abington, Massachusetts
- Died: August 28, 1916 (aged 81); South Berwick, Maine
- Education: Berwick Academy; Amherst College; Andover Theological Seminary
- Occupations: Clergyman, writer

Signature
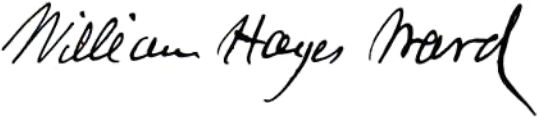

William Hayes Ward (June 25, 1835 – August 28, 1916) was an American clergyman, editor, and Orientalist.

== Biography ==
William Hayes Ward was born in Abington, Massachusetts on June 25, 1835.

After attending Berwick Academy in Maine, adjacent to the family Hayes House, Ward graduated from Phillips Academy, Andover, in 1852, Amherst College in 1856, and the Andover Theological Seminary in 1859. He served as pastor of a church at Oskaloosa, Kansas in 1859–60, and as professor of Latin at Ripon College in Wisconsin (1865–68). He joined the editorial staff of the New York Independent in 1868 and remained with the Independent thereafter, rising by degrees to editor in chief (1896–1913), and then honorary editor. He directed the Wolfe Expedition to Babylonia (1884–85) and was twice president of the American Oriental Society (1890–94 and 1909–10). He was the father of Herbert D. Ward.

William Hayes Ward died at his home in South Berwick, Maine on August 28, 1916.

== Works ==
- The World's Christian Hymns (1883), with his sister Susan Hayes Ward
- Report of the Wolfe Expedition to Babylonia (1885)
- Biography of Sidney Lanier (1885)
- Cylinders and Other Ancient Oriental Seals in the Library of J. Pierpont Morgan (1909)
- The Seal Cylinders of Western Asia (1910)
- What I Believe and Why (1915)
