= Jonathan Gold (Buddhist studies scholar) =

American Buddhist studies scholar

- Education: Amherst College; University of Chicago
- Occupation: Buddhist studies scholar

Jonathan Gold is an American Buddhist studies scholar. He is the D. T. Suzuki Professor in Buddhist Studies in the department of religion at Princeton University.
