= Richard Fenno =

American political scientist (1926–2020)

- Born: Richard Francis Fenno Jr. December 12, 1926; Milwaukee, Wisconsin, U.S.
- Died: April 21, 2020 (aged 93); Mount Kisco, New York, U.S.
- Education: Amherst College; Harvard University
- Occupation: Political scientist

Richard Francis Fenno Jr. (December 12, 1926 – April 21, 2020) was an American political scientist known for his pioneering work on the U.S. Congress and its members. He was a Distinguished University Professor Emeritus at the University of Rochester. He published numerous books and scholarly articles focused on how members of Congress interacted with each other, with committees, and with constituents. Political scientists considered the research groundbreaking and startlingly original and gave him numerous awards. Many followed his research design on how to follow members from Washington back to their home districts. Fenno was best known for identifying the tendency — dubbed "Fenno's Paradox" — of how most voters say they dislike Congress as a whole, but they trust and reelect their local Congressman.

== Early life and education ==
Fenno grew up in Boston and served in the U.S. Navy during World War II. After the war, he graduated from Amherst College in 1948 and completed a Ph.D. degree in political science under William Yandell Elliott at Harvard University in 1956.

== Career ==
In 1958, Fenno was hired by the University of Rochester, where he spent his career. He wrote about Republicans and Democrats and explored rural, urban and African American congressional districts in depth. An independent who never publicized his personal political views, he never endorsed any candidates.

Fenno's books Congressmen in Committees (1973) and Home Style: House Members in Their Districts (1978), for which he won the first D. B. Hardeman Prize, established him as a leading scholar of American politics. With William Riker, Fenno built the reputation of University of Rochester's political science department. Riker focused on positive political science, while Fenno focused on establishing Rochester as a center for congressional studies. He built the first internship program for undergraduates to work in Congress.

Fenno's trademark style of political science research is sometimes referred to as "Soak and Poke" (see Fenno, 1986). Rather than relying primarily on data sets or rational choice theory, Fenno undertook empirical observation of the movements of political actors on the stage of politics. His most famous book Home Style is written in this fashion.

In 1978, Fenno won the American Political Science Association's (APSA) Woodrow Wilson Award for the best book in political science for "Home Style".

In 1996, the Association for Budgeting & Financial Management awarded Fenno its Aaron Wildavsky Award for Lifetime Scholarly Achievement in Public Budgeting, for his work on Congress and appropriations. Congress at the Grassroots won the 2001 V. O. Key Award for the best book on southern politics.

Fenno served as book review editor of the American Political Science Review (1968–1971), as a director of the Social Science Research Council, and as president of APSA (1984–1985). He was also a member of the National Academy of Sciences, a Fellow of the American Academy of Arts and Sciences, and a member of the American Philosophical Society. Since 1986, APSA's Legislative Studies Section has awarded the Richard F. Fenno Jr. Prize for the best book on legislative studies.

Fenno's archival collection is housed at the University of Rochester's River Campus Libraries Department of Rare Books, Special Collections, and Preservation. Research interviews and oral history notes are also housed at the National Archives and Records Administration's Center for Legislative Activities.

According to Norman J. Ornstein:

Fenno was hands down the most significant student of Congress of the last half of the 20th century. He was the first to note that voters loved their congressman while hating Congress, he wrote the definitive study of the appropriations process (“The Power of the Purse”) and a series of books where he explored the relationship between legislators at home and in Washington.

== Death ==
On April 21, 2020, Fenno died in Mount Kisco, New York, from the effects of COVID-19.

== Selected publications ==
- The President's Cabinet: An Analysis in the Period from Wilson to Eisenhower. 1959. Harvard University Press. online no charge to borrow
- The Power of the Purse: Appropriations Politics in Congress. 1966. Little, Brown. online
- Congressmen in Committees. 1973. Little, Brown.
- Home Style: House Members in their Districts. 1978. Little, Brown. online
- The United States Senate: a bicameral perspective (1982) [http,
- "Observation, Context, and Sequence in the Study of Politics". 1986. American Political Science Review 80(1): 3–15. online
- The making of a senator: Dan Quayle (1989), online
- The presidential odyssey of John Glenn (1990), online
- Learning to legislate : the Senate education of Arlen Specter (1991), online
- The emergence of a Senate leader: Pete Domenici and the Reagan budget (1991), online
- "Strategy and Sophisticated Voting in the Senate". 1994. Journal of Politics 56(2): 349–376 (with Randall L. Calvert). DOI: 10.2307/2132143 online
- Senators on the Campaign Trail: The Politics of Representation. 1996. University of Oklahoma Press.
- Congress at the Grassroots: Representational Change in the South, 1970–1998. 2000. University of North Carolina Press.
- Going Home: Black Representatives and their Constituents. 2003. University of Chicago Press online.
- Congressional Travels: Places, Connections, and Authenticity. 2007. Pearson/Longman.

== See also ==
- Fenno's paradox
