= Herbert Dickinson Ward =

American novelist (1861–1932)

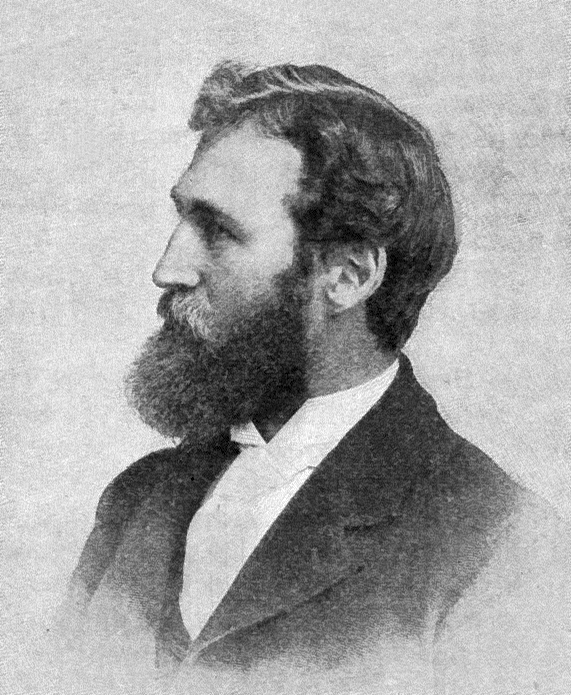
Herbert Dickinson Ward

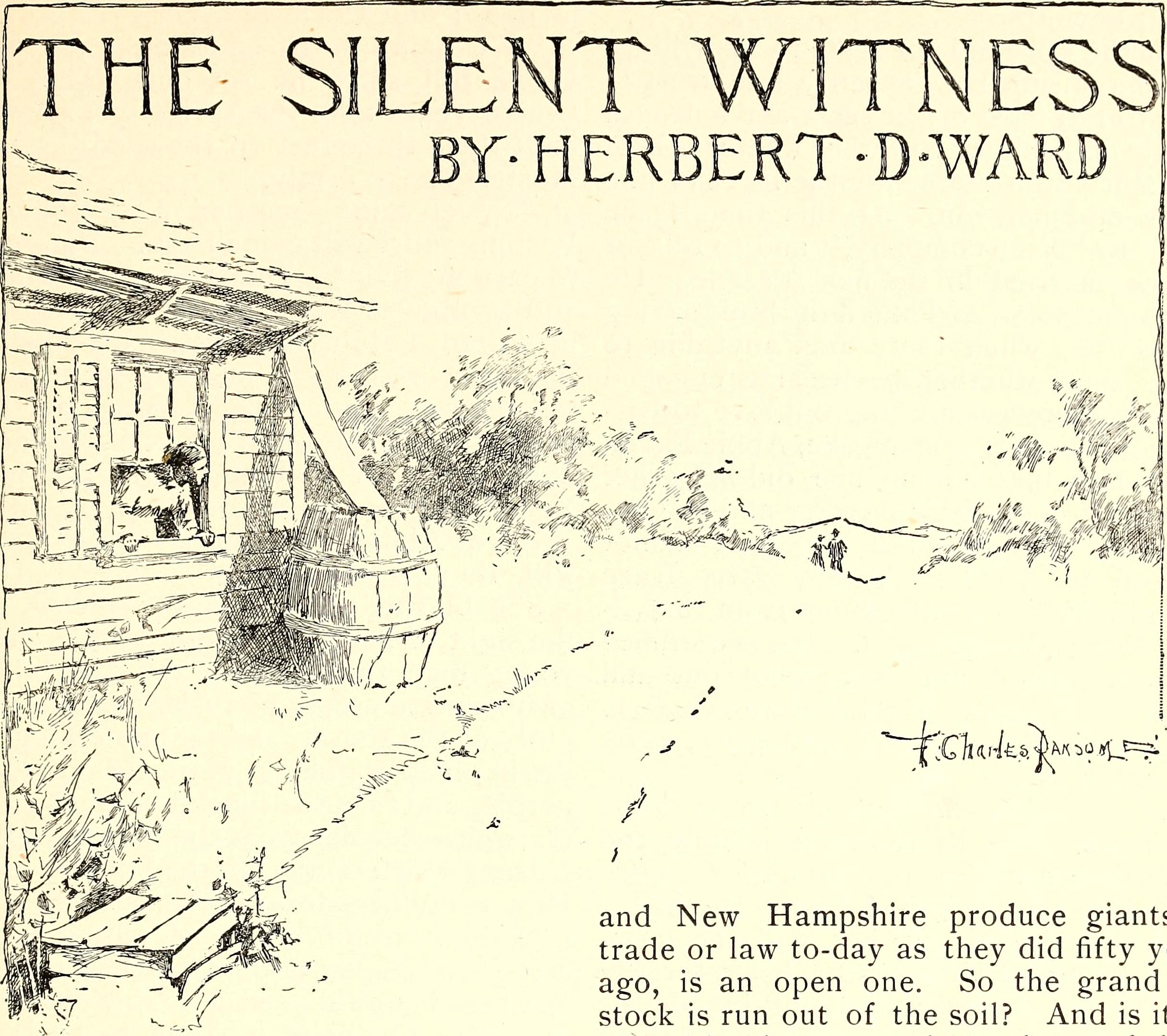
McClure's magazine, January 1896

Herbert Dickinson Ward (June 29, 1861 – June 27, 1932) was an American author, born at Waltham, Massachusetts, son of William Hayes Ward. Graduating from Phillips Academy, Andover, in 1880 and Amherst College in 1884, he wrote extensively for newspapers and periodicals. Ward married Elizabeth Stuart Phelps on October 20, 1888.

== Works ==
- The New Senior at Andover (1890)
- A Republic without a President, and Other Stories (1891)
- The Captain of the Kittiewink (1892)
- A Dash to the Pole (1893)
- The White Crown, and Other Stories (1894)
- The Silent Witness (1896)
- The Burglar Who Moved Paradise (1897)
- The Light of the World (1901)

Co-authored with his wife Elizabeth Stuart Phelps Ward

- A Lost Hero (1889)
- The Master of the Magicians (1890)
- Come Forth (1891)
