= Thomas W. Mitchell =

American legal scholar

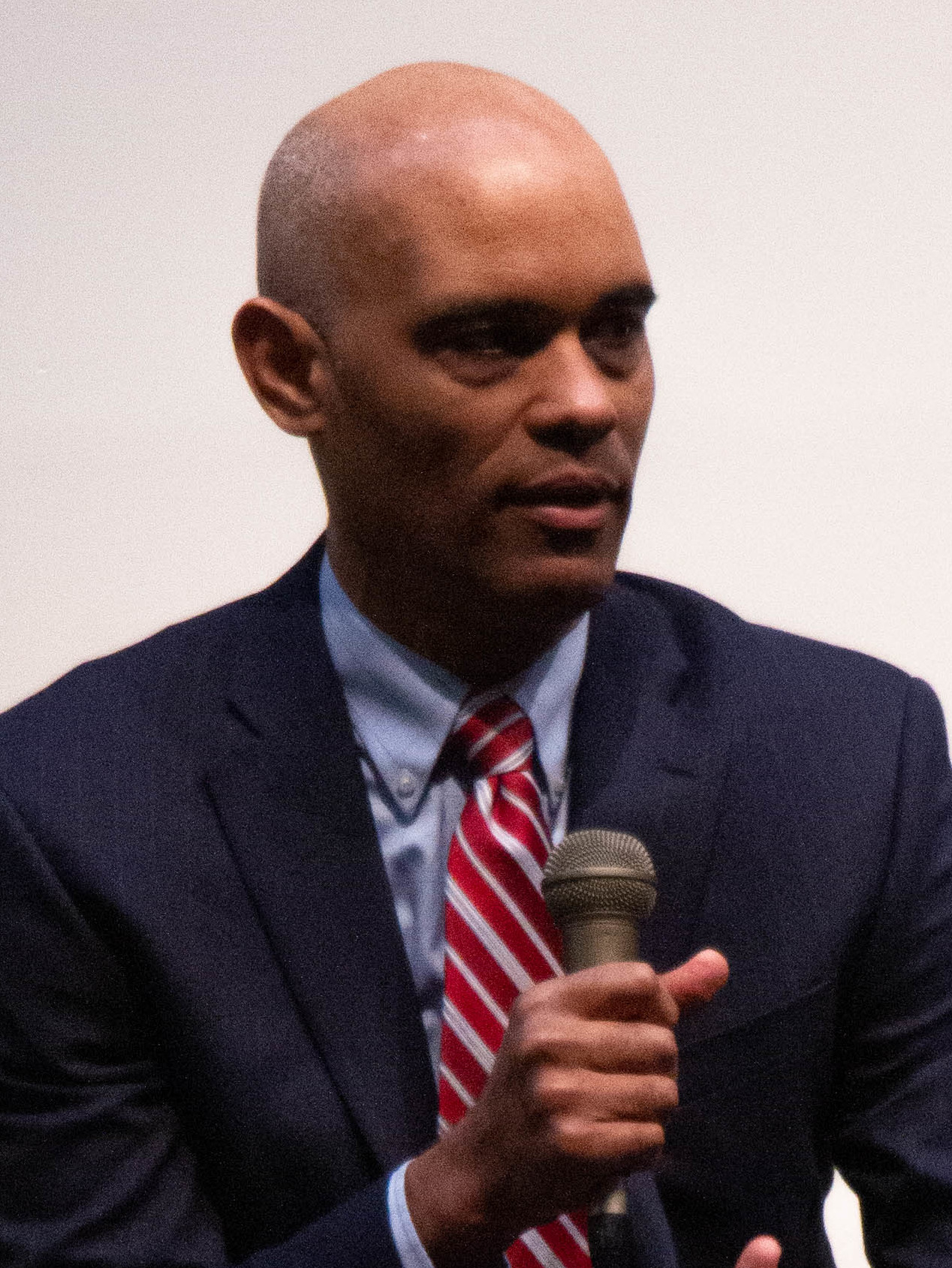
- Mitchell in 2020
- Education: Amherst College (BA); Howard University (JD); University of Wisconsin–Madison (LLM)
- Awards: MacArthur Fellow
- Scientific career
- Fields: Legal studies
- Workplaces: University of Wisconsin Law School; Texas A&M University School of Law; Boston College Law School

Thomas Wilson Mitchell is an American law professor. He is a professor at Boston College Law School. His work focuses on property law, particularly the legal doctrines that have caused Black Americans to lose millions of acres of land since the early 1900s. Mitchell was a 2020 MacArthur Fellow. Recently, he founded and became Director of the Initiative on Land, Housing & Property Rights alongside his wife, Professor Lisa T. Alexander, at Boston College Law School.

== Education and positions ==
Mitchell attended Amherst College, where he graduated with a B.A. degree in English in 1987. He then attended the Howard University School of Law, obtaining his J.D. degree in 1993. In 1999 he received an LLM degree from the University of Wisconsin Law School, where he was William H. Hastie Fellow.

In 2000, Mitchell joined the faculty at the University of Wisconsin Law School, where he became Professor of Law and Frederick W. and Vi Miller Chair in Law. In 2016, he joined the law faculty at Texas A&M University, with a joint appointment as a professor in the Department of Agricultural Economics. In 2022, he joined Boston College Law School as the Robert J. Drinan, S.J. Endowed Chair. Mitchell is also the Director of the Initiative on Land, Housing & Property Rights which seeks to help disadvantaged people and communities acquire and secure important property rights.

== Research ==
Mitchell's research has focused on the legal causes of loss of land by Black Americans. He has shown that between the Civil War and the year 1910 Black Americans came to possess about 15 million acres of land in the south, but by the end of the 20th century that number had shrunk to only about 2 million acres. Mitchell has studied the legal processes by which this loss occurred, particularly that laws that govern inheritance in cases where an owner does not leave a will and there are multiple heirs. These doctrines have, over time, caused large amounts of land to leave the heirs of Black property owners through mechanisms like forced partition sales. This type of legal dispossession of land can be viewed as a vestige of Jim Crow laws. Mitchell has argued that forced sale conditions lower the expected value of a sale, and minority land owners are more likely to be placed in a force sale situation rather than voluntarily choosing to sell land; consequently, this inheritance law systematically lowers their wealth over time. This is an example of legal empiricism, which Mitchell has argued is an important methodology for understanding the causes of land loss.

Mitchell was the principal drafter of a law, called the Partition of Heirs Property Act, which aimed to give the descendants of heirs a better chance of retaining property that they wish to retain. By October 2020, the Partition of Heirs Property Act had been adopted in 18 states.

In 2020, Mitchell was named a MacArthur Fellow.

As a part of his current employment at the Boston College Law School (2022), he has designated time to further research into Heirs Property and the issues surrounding those that are effected. Thomas Mitchell continues his research and legislative work nationwide to bring justice to disadvantaged communities.

== Selected works ==
- "From Reconstruction to Deconstruction: Undermining Black Landownership, Political Independence, and Community through Partition Sales of Tenancies in Common", Northwestern University Law Review (2000)
- "Historic Partition Law Reform: A Game Changer for Heirs' Property Owners", United States Department of Agriculture (2019)
- "Destabilizing the Normalization of Rural Black Land Loss: A Critical Role for Legal Empiricism", Wisconsin Law Review (2005)
- "Forced Sale Risk: Class, Race, and the Double Discount", Florida State University Law Review (2009)

== Selected awards ==
- MacArthur Fellows Program (2020)
- Elizabeth Hurlock Beckman Award (2020)
