= Dustin Thao =

Vietnamese-American author

- Born: 1990 (age 35–36); Oregon, U.S.
- Education: Amherst College (BA) Northwestern University (PhD)
- Occupation: Novelist
- Writing career
- Genre: Young adult fiction
- Notable work: You've Reached Sam (2021)
- Website: dustinthao.com

Dustin Thao is a Vietnamese-American author based in New York City. His works are rooted in contemporary young adult fiction, with elements of magic realism.

== Life and career ==
Thao was born in Oregon. He has an older brother and younger sister. He named Bridge to Terabithia and films like Kimi no Na wa as sources of inspirations. He graduated from Amherst College with a B.A. in political science, and is currently in a PhD program at Northwestern University, studying critical media literacy.

In November 2021, Thao's debut young adult novel, You've Reached Sam, was published through Macmillan's imprint Wednesday Books, which became an instant New York Times bestseller. It centers on grief and moving on, where the protagonist Julie Clarke loses her boyfriend Sam Obayashi in a car accident. It took the author a couple years to complete, drawing on his own personal experiences of loss.

His second novel, When Haru Was Here, was also published by Wednesday Books on September 3, 2024. It follows aspiring filmmaker Eric Ly, who meets the mysterious Haru Tanaka during a high school trip but forget to exchange contact information. Fourteen months later, the two reunite.

The follow-up novel to his debut, entitled You've Found Oliver, landed a seven-figure deal with Dutton Books for Young Readers, released on September 30, 2025. It was edited by Julie Strauss-Gabel, and follows Oliver, the friend of the late Sam, who a year later meets a college student named Ben who was reassigned Sam's number. However, they are separated by six months in different timelines. Thao gave a statement to Publishers Weekly, where Oliver became a fan-favorite and if he ever did continue the story, it would follow him. The idea sprung from a dinner he had with fellow authors Chloe Gong and Alex Aster, where the latter arrived late and were unable to find each other at the same restaurant. He recalled, "I remember the feeling of that moment—of two people standing at the exact same spot at the exact same time, speaking on the phone, but unable to see one another, and it was just this feeling that I can't describe. By the end of the dinner, I said, 'Guys, I know what this book is about'". People magazine published an exclusive excerpt on August 26, 2025. He also dedicated the book to Gong and Aster.

== Bibliography ==
- You've Reached Sam (2021)
- When Haru Was Here (2024)
- You've Found Oliver (2025)
