= David Bradford (economist) =

American economist

David F. Bradford
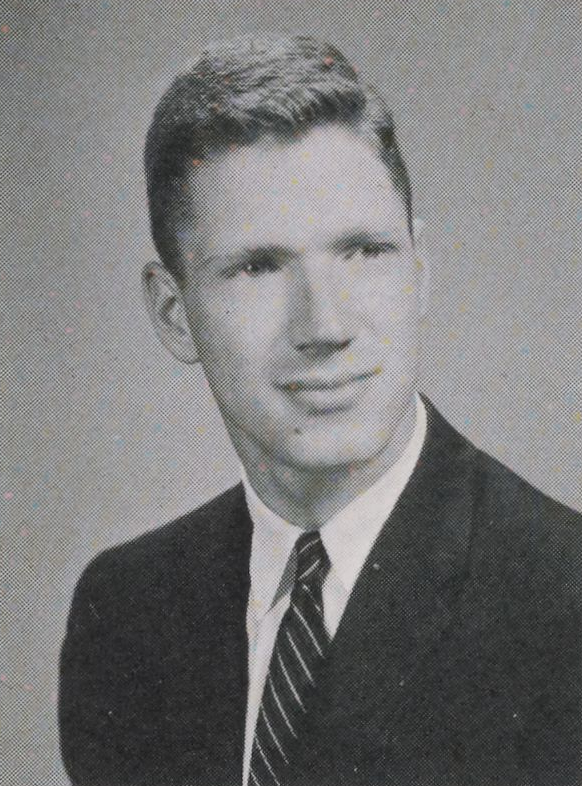
- Bradford in the Amherst College yearbook, 1960
- Born: January 8, 1939; Cambridge, Massachusetts, US
- Died: February 22, 2005 (aged 66); Philadelphia, Pennsylvania, US

Academic background
- Education: Stanford University; Harvard University; Amherst College
- Doctoral advisor: Kenneth Arrow

Academic work
- Institutions: Princeton University

David Frantz Bradford (January 8, 1939 – February 22, 2005) was a prominent American economist and professor of economics and public affairs in the Woodrow Wilson School at Princeton University.

== Biography ==
Bradford was born in Cambridge, Massachusetts. After his graduation from Amherst College in 1960, Bradford studied at MIT and Harvard (M.S., Applied Mathematics, 1962). In 1966 he earned his doctorate in economics from Stanford University. He was awarded the degree of Doctor of Humane Letters by Amherst College in 1985.

From 1991 to 1993, he served as a member of the President's Council of Economic Advisors (George H. W. Bush). He had previously served as Deputy Assistant Secretary for Tax Policy in the United States Department of the Treasury (1975–1976).

Bradford's research focused on Public economics. He was a noted authority on tax policy and taxation. A prolific writer, his published work addressed a broad range of economic issues concerning the public sector, taxation, environment, and the military.

Douglas Holtz-Eakin called him "The best tax economist".

Bradford died in Philadelphia on February 22, 2005, from burns of a house fire two weeks earlier.

== Selected publications ==
Books

- 1986. Untangling the Income Tax, Harvard University Press
- 1996. Fundamental Issues in Consumption Taxation. AEI Press. Scroll to chapter-preview links.
- 2000. Taxation, Wealth, and Saving, MIT Press. Description and scroll to chapter-preview links.
- 2004. The X Tax in the World Economy: Going Global with a Simple, Progressive Tax, AEI Press. Scroll to chapter-preview links.

Articles/Chapters

- 1970 "Optimal Departures From Marginal Cost Pricing," (with William J. Baumol) American Economic Review, 60(3)), pp. 265-283 (+).
- 1976. "The Optimal Taxation of Commodities and Income." (with Harvey S. Rosen) American Economic Review 66(2), p p. 94–101.
- 1979. "The Case for a Personal Consumption Tax," in What Should be Taxed, Income or Expenditure?, ed. Joseph A. Pechman, pp. 75–113. Brookings Institution. Reprinted at Bradford, 2000, ch. 1.
- 2004. "Generalized Cash-Flow Taxation," (with Alan J. Auerbach) Journal of Public Economics, 88(5), pp. 957–980 (press +).
