= Andrea Dutton =

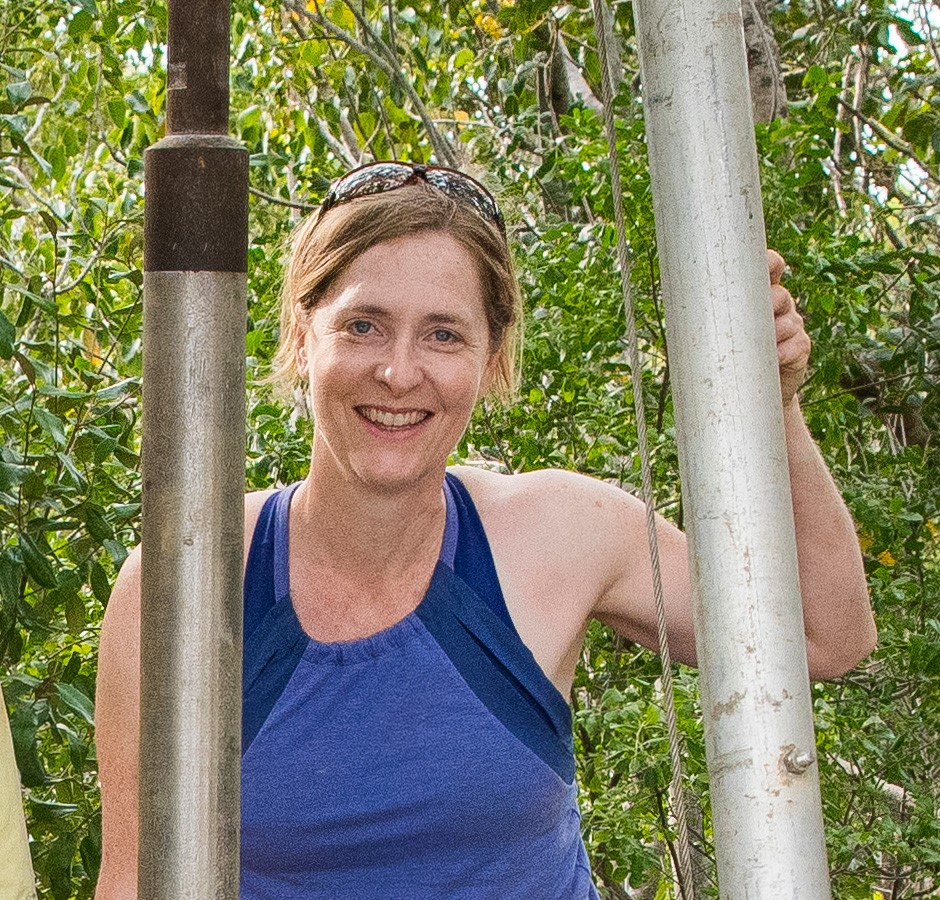
- Education: Amherst College (BA), University of Michigan (MS and PhD), Australian National University (POSTDOC)
- Occupations: Professor of Geology at University of Wisconsin–Madison, paleoclimatologist, carbonate geologist.
- Awards: MacArthur Fellow, Geological Society of America Fellow, Faculty Fellow of the Thompson Earth Institute, 2016 Global Fellow at University of Florida

Andrea Dutton, a 2019 MacArthur Fellow, is a Professor of Geology in the Department of Geoscience at the University of Wisconsin–Madison where she studies paleoclimate, sedimentology, carbonate geochemistry, and paleo-oceanography. Her research centers on sea level changes during interglacial periods to predict future sea level rise.

== Early life and education ==
Andrea Dutton was born in Fairfax, Virginia and spent most of her childhood in Atlanta, Georgia and Westport, Connecticut. Dutton graduated from Staples High School in Westport, Connecticut in 1991. From 1991 to 1995, Dutton attended Amherst College where she studied music and focused on classes that would prepare her for the MCAT. Dutton took her first geology class at Amherst, and immediately "fell in love" with the geological sciences. This altered the direction of her career towards geology. She credits her interdisciplinary education as the reason for her unique approach to environmental issues. She graduated from Amherst College in 1995 with a BA in music. Following her time at Amherst, Dutton taught 3rd, 6th, 10th, 11th and 12th grade science at Saint Ann's School in Brooklyn Heights, New York City. There she learned a lot about public speaking on scientific topics, which stimulated her attention to scientific communication in her future work. In 2003, Dutton returned to academic study and earned an M.S. (2000) and a Ph.D. (2003) in Geological Sciences from the University of Michigan. She continued her research as a Postdoctoral Scholar (two years) and then Research Fellow (four years) at the Australian National University (ANU).

== Career and research ==
Dutton was an Assistant, then Associate Professor of Geology at the University of Florida in Gainesville, Florida from 2011 to 2019, and now is a Full Professor of Geology at the University of Wisconsin–Madison. She co-led an international group that utilizes the geological record to understand sea level rise from 2013 to 2017. For her Ph.D., Dutton researched paleoclimate between the Cretaceous and Eocene periods in the Antarctic Peninsula. During her time as a Research Fellow at ANU, Dutton worked in collaboration with Kurt Lambeck, a geophysicist, to develop an interdisciplinary approach to reconstructing past sea levels using radiometrically dated fossilized coral.

Dutton specializes in paleoceanography and paleoclimatology. Her most recognized work concentrates on reconstructing past sea level variation to predict future changes. To understand how sea level will fluctuate in the future, Dutton looks at what is preserved in the rock record. Specifically, Dutton utilizes fossilized coral and limestone rocks to understand how past sea level increased during warming climates throughout earth's history. She has explored the shores of Italy, Australia, America, Jamaica, the Bahamas, Seychelles, and Mexico to obtain data from fossilized coral reefs. Because corals live in shallow waters, they can advantageously be used to track past sea level positions. Dutton also uses other sedimentary archives to further analyze geologic changes throughout earth's history. In 2019, Dutton was awarded a Fulbright Scholarship to work with researchers in New Zealand to combine records of past sea level rise with models of Antarctic ice dynamics to better understand the effects of warming temperatures on sea levels.

When assessing sea level fluctuations, Dutton studies the geochemistry, geophysics and biology of each reef. In her research, Dutton uses chemistry techniques to find the age of the coral and combines this information with the elevation changes of the reef through time to understand sea level changes. This research also provides knowledge about how ice sheets melted, which can better inform projections of ice sheet fluctuations with future climatic changes. Dutton primarily focuses on sea level rise from 125,000 years ago, when temperatures were similar to today's. She studies sea level rise throughout the world, including Florida, the Seychelles Islands, and Mexico's Yucatán Peninsula. One of her research objectives is to determine when the West Antarctic ice sheet collapsed in the past to help us understand when and how this may occur in the future. The findings of Dutton's work are influential for urban planners as coastal communities struggle to adapt to rising seas.

On June 13, 2025, a team of researchers led by Dutton published findings from their investigation into corral fossils in the journal Science Advances, concluding that sea levels could be rising faster and higher than expected, due to climate change. The study examined ancient coral reefs in the Seychelles and identified three separate periods when sea levels rose rapidly. These findings suggest that changes in the Greenland and Antarctic ice sheets contributed to fluctuations in sea levels during past periods of warming.

== Awards and honors ==
- MacArthur Fellow
- Fulbright Scholar (2019–20)
- Geological Society of America Fellow
- Faculty Fellow of the Thompson Earth Institute
- 2016 Global Fellow at University of Florida
- Rolling Stone Magazine's "25 People Shaping the Future in Tech, Science, Medicine, Activism and More"
- 2015 Faculty Fellow of the Florida Climate Institute

== Public engagement ==
Andrea Dutton often shares the results of her research work with the public outside the scientific community. Climate communication has been something that Dutton has emphasized since her teaching experiences at the Saint Anne's School in Brooklyn, New York. She has shared her research to the general public through a variety of media forums such as:

- TEDxUF: Theme: Transparent (2017)
- The New York Times: Gillis, Justin. (2017). The Sea Level Did, in Fact, Rise Faster in the Southeast U.S
- Forecast: Climate Conversations with Michael White
- NPR: Greene, David. (2018) U.S. Faces 'Immediate Threat" From Climate Change, Report Says.
- The Washington Post: Mooney, Chris (2015). Why the Earth's past has scientists so worried about sea level rise.
- The Atlantic: Lieberman, Amy (2016). Preparing for the Inevitable Sea-Level Rise
- The Wall Street Journal: Dutton, Andrea. Mann, Michael. (2018) Water is Rising Because It's Getting Warmer

== Publications ==
- R Creel, R Kopp, A Dutton, Y Zhou, M Raymo, C Britt, R DeConto (2026) North American ice sheet persistence into past interglacials should inform future projections (Science).
- A Dutton, K Lambeck (2012) Ice volume and sea level during the last interglacial (Science).
- A Dutton, AE Carlson, AJ Long, GA Milne, PU Clark, R DeConto, BP Horton, S Rahmstorf, ME Raymo (2015) Sea-level rise due to polar ice-sheet mass loss during past warm periods (Science).
- A Dutton, BH Wilkinson, JM Welker, GJ Bowen, KC Lohmann (2005) Spatial distribution and seasonal variation in ^{18}O/^{16}O of modern precipitation and river water across the conterminous USA (Hydrological Processes: An International Journal).
- F Antonioli, L Ferranti, A Fontana, A Amorosi, A Bondesan, C Braitenberg, A Dutton, G Fontolan, S Furlani, K Lambeck, G Mastronuzzi, C Monaco, G Spada, P Stocchi (2009) Holocene relative sea-level changes and vertical movements along the Italian and Istrian coastlines (Quaternary International).
- M Greaves, N Caillon, H Rabaubier, G Bartoli, S Bohaty, I Cacho, L Clarke, M Cooper, C Daunt, M Delaney, P DeMenocal, Andrea Dutton, Stephen Eggins, Henry Elderfield, Dieter Garbe-Schoenberg, Ethan Goddard, D Green, J Groeneveld, D Hastings, E Hathorne, K Kimoto, Gary Klinkhammer, Laurent Labeyrie, David W Lea, Tom Marchitto, MA Martínez-Botí, Peter Graham Mortyn, Y Ni, Dirk Nürnberg, G Paradis, L Pena, Terrence Quinn, Y Rosenthal, Ann Russell, T Sagawa, Sindia Sosdian, L Stott, K Tachikawa, E Tappa, R Thunell, PA Wilson (2008) Interlaboratory comparison study of calibration standards for foraminiferal Mg/Ca thermometry (Geochemistry, Geophysics, Geosystems).
- A Dutton, KC Lohmann, WJ Zinsmeister (2002) Stable isotope and minor element proxies of Eocene climate and Seymour Island, Antarctica (Paleoceanography).

For a more complete list of Dutton's peer-reviewed publications see her Google Scholar Profile.
