= Court of Neptune Fountain =

Fountain in Washington, D.C.

- U.S. National Historic Landmark
- D.C. Inventory of Historic Sites
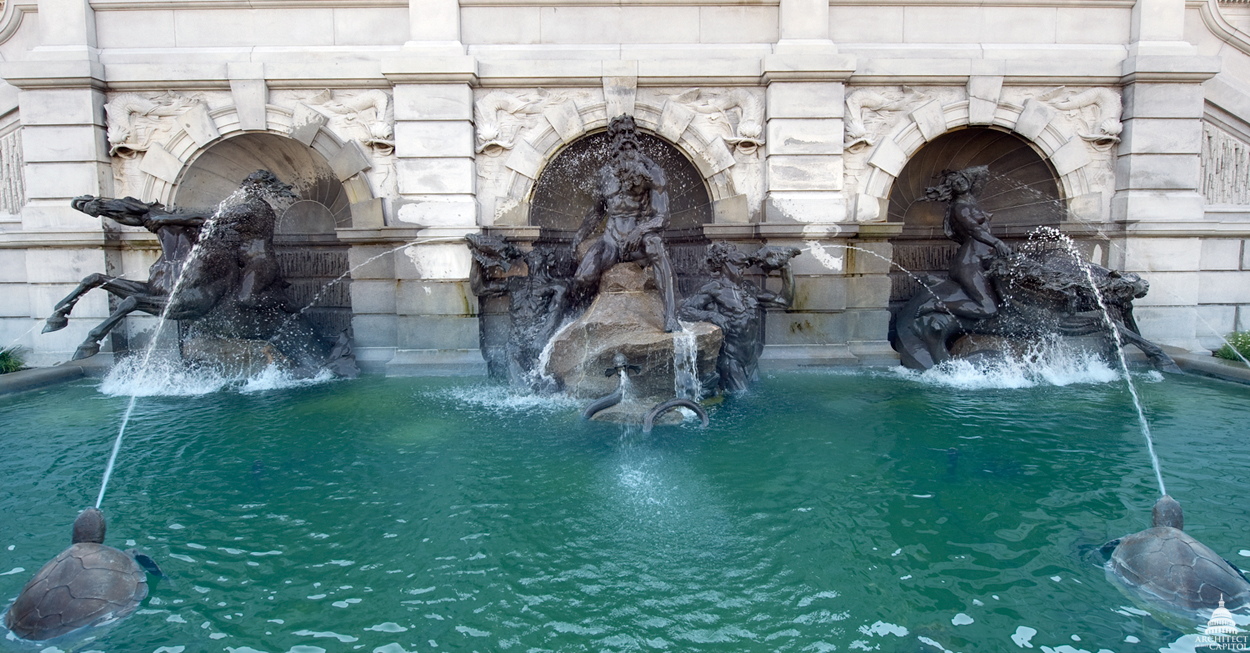
- Photographed in 2013
- Location: Thomas Jefferson Building, Washington, D.C.
- Coordinates: 38.888681°N 77.005770°W
- Built: 1898
- Architects: Roland Hinton Perry, Albert Weinert (sculptors); John L. Smithmeyer, Paul J. Pelz, Edward Pearce Casey (architects)
- Part of: Library of Congress (ID66000000)

Significant dates
- Added to NRHP: December 21, 1965
- Designated DCIHS: November 8, 1964

The Court of Neptune Fountain is a fountain adorned with bronze sculptures made by Roland Hinton Perry and Albert Weinert in the late 1890s. Jerome Connor may have assisted in their manufacture. The architects for the project, which was completed in 1898, included John L. Smithmeyer, Paul J. Pelz, and Edward Pearce Casey, while the founding was completed by the Henry-Bonnard Bronze Company. The fountain is located on the west side of the Thomas Jefferson Building, the main building for the Library of Congress in Washington, D.C. The project took three years to complete.

The granite semi-circular fountain includes multiple bronze sculptures, including Neptune, his Tritons, and naiads. The fountain has been cleaned and restored on many occasions, sometimes to repair the sculptures, and other times to clean the basin and niches. As part of the Thomas Jefferson Building, it is a contributing property to the building's designation as a National Historic Landmark. The building is also listed on the District of Columbia Inventory of Historic Sites.

== History ==
=== Construction ===
During construction of the Thomas Jefferson Building, the French Renaissance main building of the Library of Congress (LOC), plans were made to install an ornate fountain at street-level. Roland Hinton Perry was chosen to design the fountain and its statues. Perry's other works include Commonwealth in Pennsylvania, the Thompson Elk Fountain in Oregon, and the Perry Lions on the Taft Bridge in Washington, D.C. Perry was commissioned in 1894 to create some of the Thomas Jefferson Building's interior bas-reliefs. His work was well received and two years later, he was commissioned to design the fountain.

By late 1896, most of the interior and exterior features of the building had been completed. Construction crews began preparing the area for the fountain. By this point, Perry had finished designing the Neptune sculpture. It was then cast by the Henry-Bonnard Bronze Co and shipped to the site piece-by-piece/in pieces. The foundry shipped each piece of the sculpture to the fountain site after its completion.

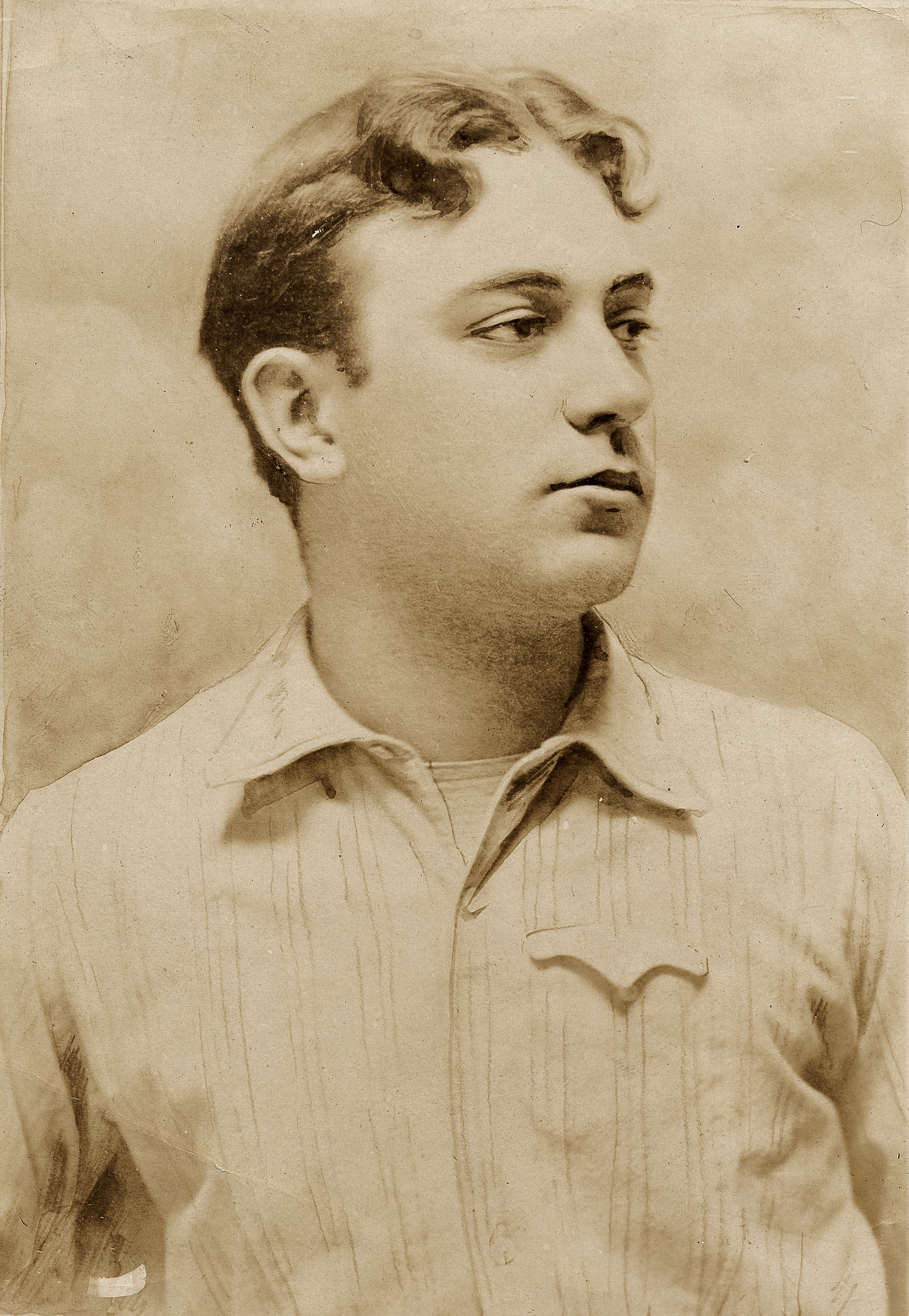
Roland Hinton Perry in 1909

Artist Albert Weinert designed some of the smaller sculptural pieces, such as the dolphins. It is possible Jerome Connor, whose other works in Washington, D.C., include Nuns of the Battlefield and the statue of John Carroll, assisted as a bronze founderer. Other architects who worked on the fountain include Edward Pearce Casey, John L. Smithmeyer, and the main architect of the Thomas Jefferson Building, Paul J. Pelz. The fountain was completed on February 23, 1898, with the installation of the final piece, a naiad.

=== Later history ===
Upon its completion, author Herbert Small said the fountain was the most ornate in the U.S. The Library of Congress Building, including the fountain, was added to the District of Columbia Inventory of Historic Sites on November 8, 1964. On December 21 of the following year, the building was designated a National Historic Landmark on December 21, 1965. The fountain and its sculptures have been cleaned and restored on numerous occasions. These repairs have included fixing broken concrete and water pipes.

A major cleaning took place in 2017 when mineral buildup and stains were removed, masonry was repaired, and the fountain's basin was repainted. The fountain has also been vandalized. In 1998, someone removed the fig leaf covering Neptune's genitals. It was not replaced because there were no known photographs showing details of the leaf, making it difficult to replicate one, and also because visitors did not seem to care about the missing piece. In 2001, after Senator Mitch McConnell denied permission to display nude artworks in the Russell Senate Office Building rotunda, artist Raymond Wiger responded by pointing out the Court of Neptune Fountain features nudity and said "It's probably the most explicit...just a block across from the U.S. Capitol."

== Location and design ==
=== Location ===
The Court of Neptune Fountain is located in front of the west façade of the Thomas Jefferson Building facing First Street SE. Between the fountain and the building's main entrance is the Neptune Plaza. The fountain is at street level. According to a curator from the Office of the Architect of the Capitol, the fountain "is kind of a focal point of the exterior of the building. It greets people when they come into the library." A reporter for Roll Call said the Court of Neptune Fountain serves as "doorman to the Library."

=== Design ===
Following the fountain's completion, Perry stated: "I have tried to embody by Neptune and the Naiads the physical joy felt in masses of rushing water. Of course one loses a great deal of this effect when the fountain does not play. The powerful muscularity and strong movement of the groups seemed to me, when I modeled those figures, to represent the intense activity, the restlessness, and push of our peoples." His design was inspired by the Trevi Fountain in Rome.

The sculptures in the Court of Neptune Fountain are made of bronze. In addition to the sculptures of Neptune and naiads, there are Tritons flanking each side of Neptune, with water spouting from the conch shells they hold. Additional jets of water spout from a sea serpent in front of Neptune, four frogs, and two turtles. The sculptures on either side of Neptune are riding seahorses. Each of the three main sculptures is in granite niches that is topped by a bas-relief of stalactites and dolphins.

The fountain's semi-circular basin is 50-feet (15 m) long and is set into the plaza's retaining wall. The two naiads are approximately 10-feet (3 m) tall, while Neptune, who is seated on large rocks, measures 12-feet (3.7 m) tall. He is depicted as an older man with long hair and a beard, yet with great physical strength. The Tritons are also 12-feet tall and are beckoning sea people with their conch shells. The sea serpent in front of Neptune awaits orders from their king.

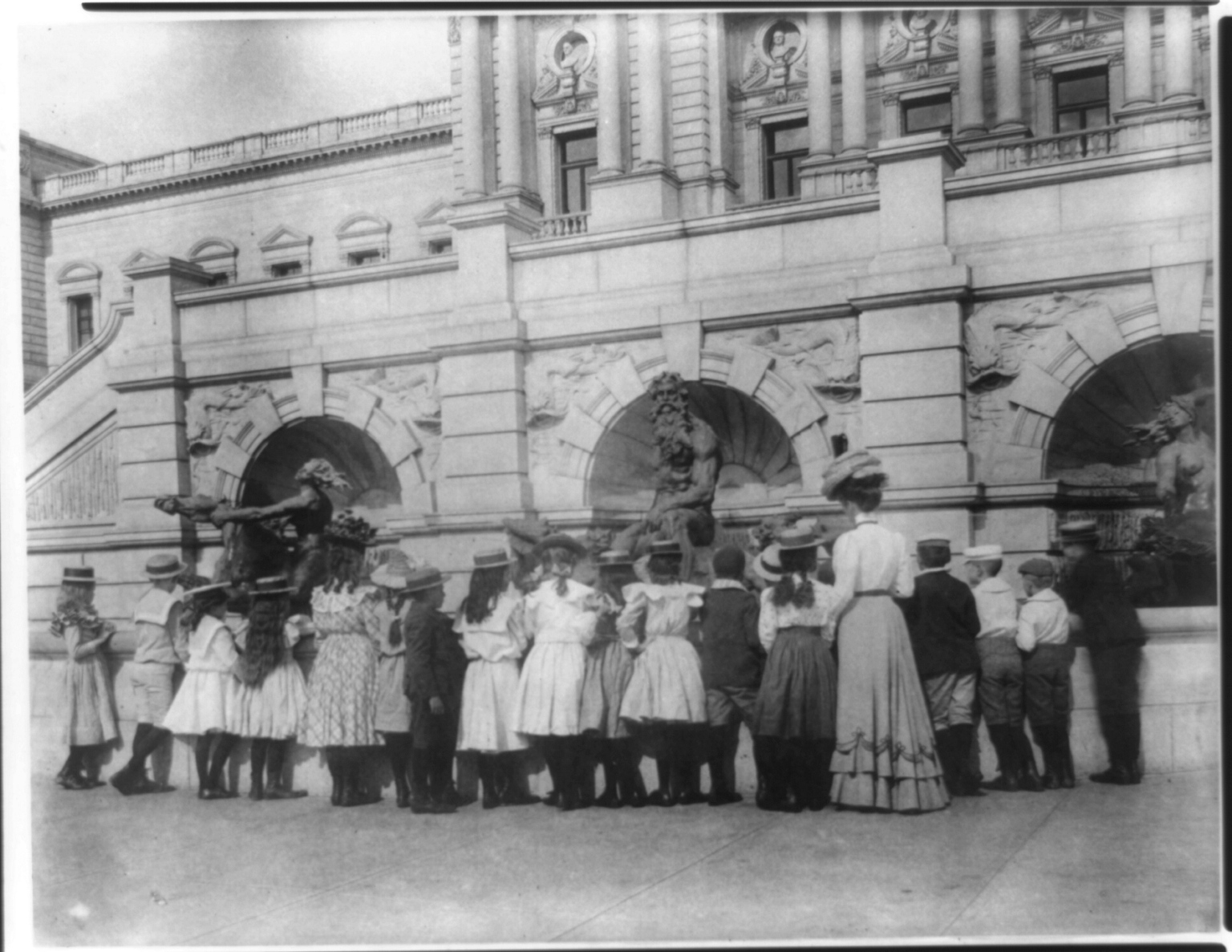
A class looking at the fountain in 1899

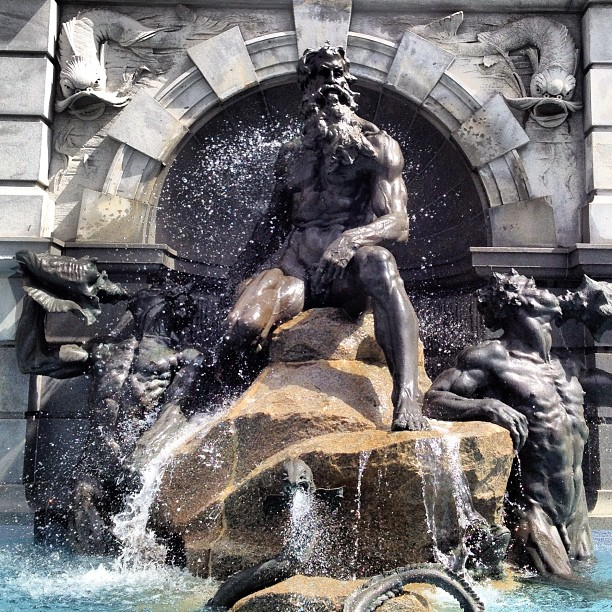
Neptune sculpture

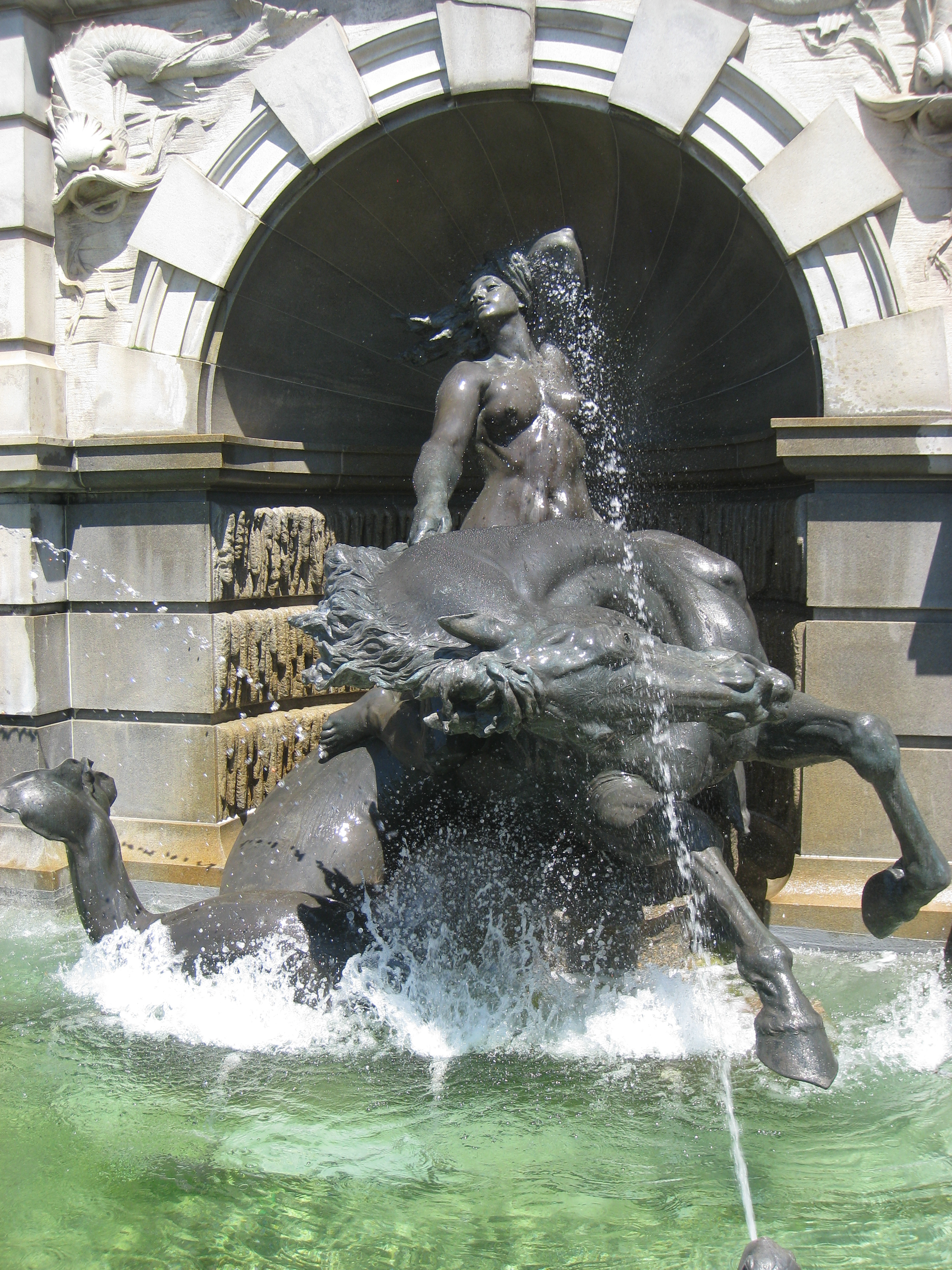
Naiad on the south side

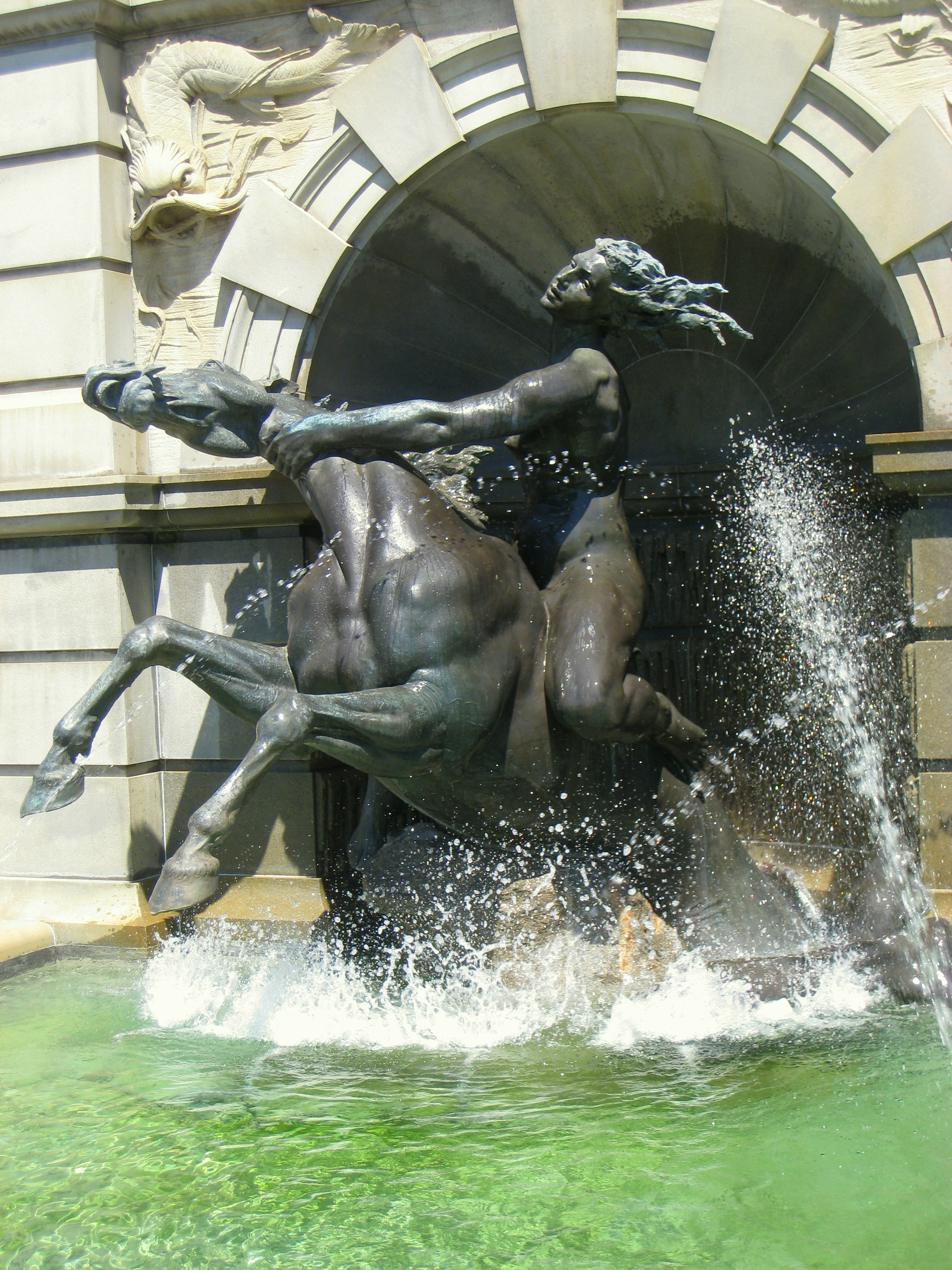
Naiad on the north side

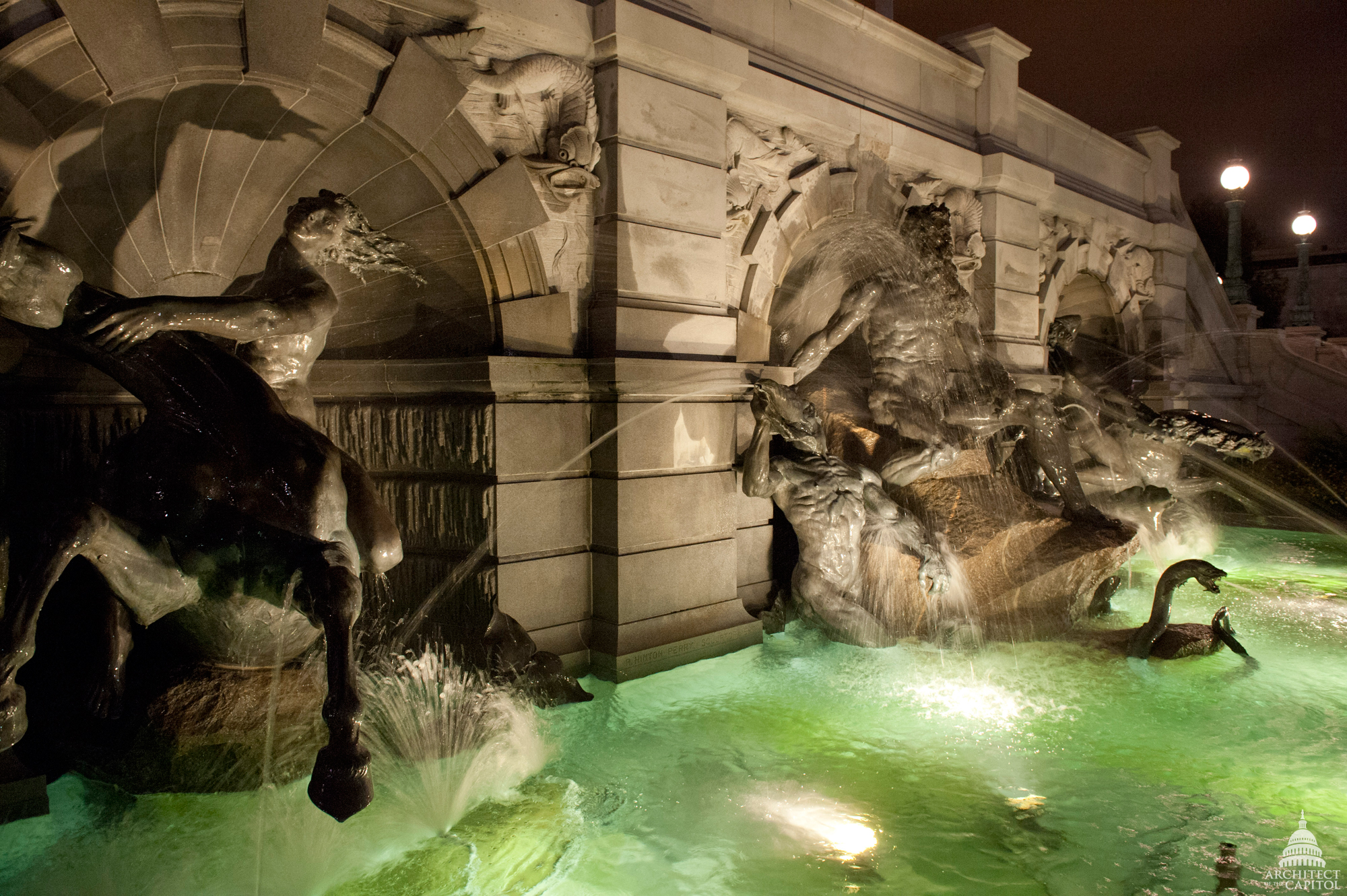
Fountain at night

== See also ==
- History of fountains in the United States
- List of public art in Washington, D.C., Ward 6
- Outdoor sculpture in Washington, D.C.
