= History of fountains in the United States =

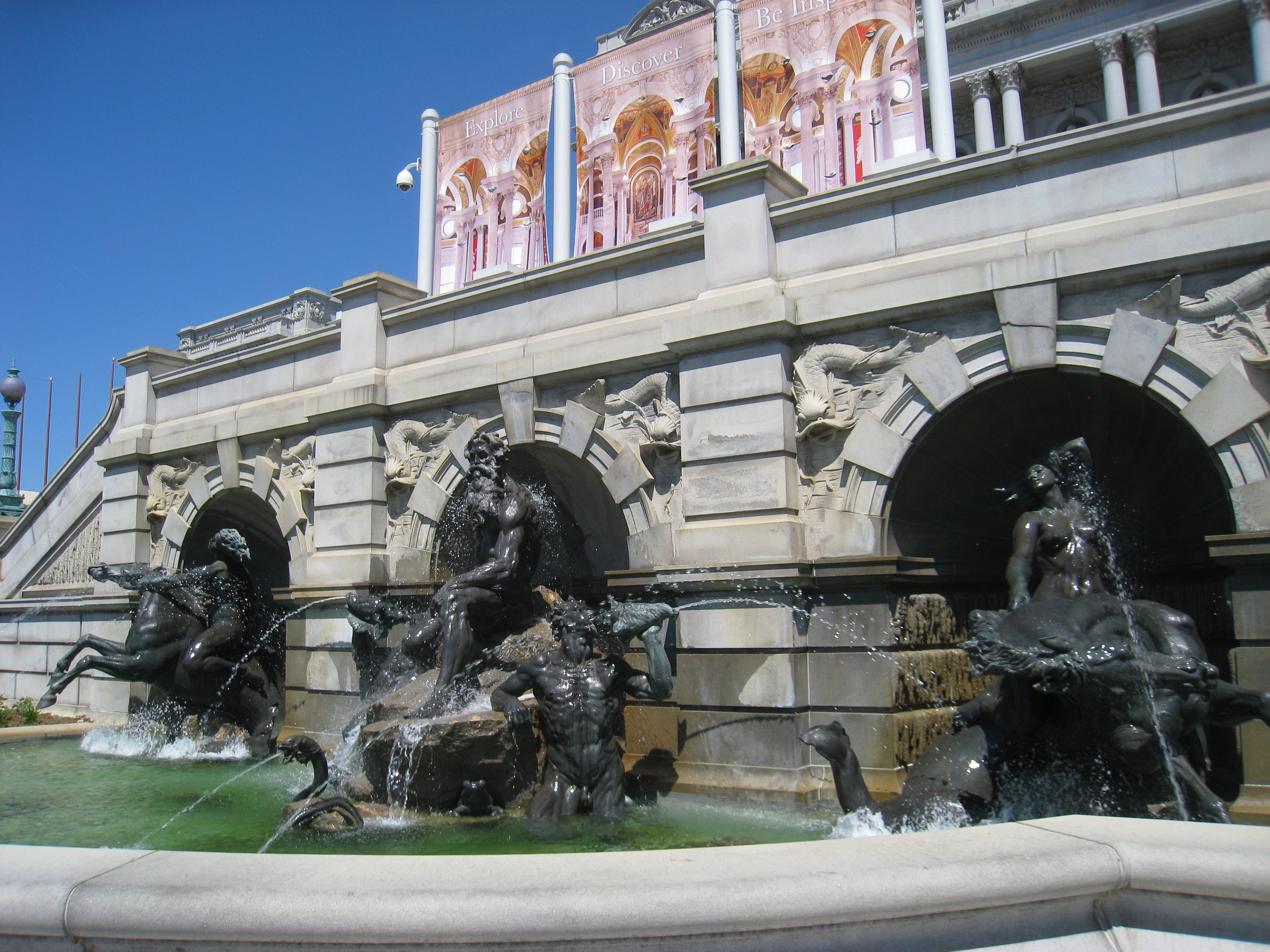
The Court of Neptune Fountain at the Library of Congress in Washington D.C. Roland Hinton Perry. (1895).

The first decorative fountain in the United States was dedicated in Philadelphia in 1809. Early American fountains were used to distribute clean drinking water, had little ornamentation, and copied European styles.

In the 20th century, American fountains ceased to distribute drinking water; they became purely decorative, and were designed to honor events or individuals, as works of urban sculpture or to imitate nature.

In the late 20th century, the musical fountain, where the dance of water is controlled by a computer and is accompanied by lights and music, became a form of public entertainment in Las Vegas and other American cities.

== 1800-1900 ==
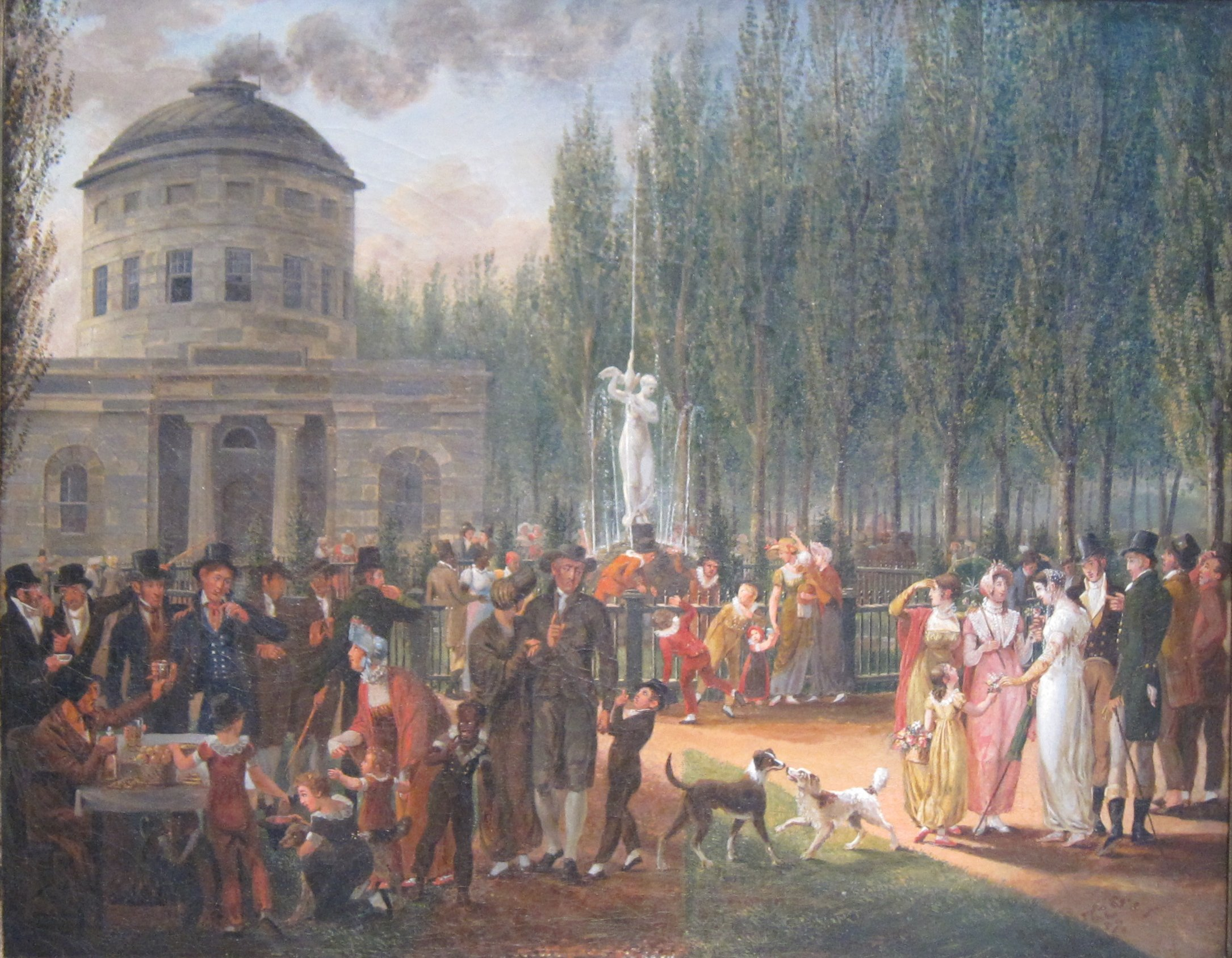
Fourth of July Celebration in Centre Square (c.1812), John Lewis Krimmel, Pennsylvania Academy of the Fine Arts.

Philadelphia built the first citywide water system in the United States, which began operation in January 1801. Underground aqueducts carried drinking water from the Schuylkill River, and twin steam pumps propelled it into a water tower at Centre Square, now the site of Philadelphia City Hall. Scottish-born architect Benjamin Henry Latrobe designed the system along with the Greek Revival pumping house/water tower. Centre Square was converted from a meadow into a public park, and an ornamental fountain was added, 1808–1809. Sculptor William Rush carved a wooden statue, Allegory of the Schuylkill River (better known as Water Nymph with Bittern), to adorn the Centre Square fountain, subsequently depicted in a genre painting by John Lewis Krimmel.

The first monumental fountains in the United States were built to mark the termini of aqueducts bringing fresh drinking water into New York City. A cholera epidemic in 1832 and the disastrous Great Fire of New York, in 1835, persuaded the government of New York City to build the Croton aqueduct to bring abundant fresh water into the city. The Croton Dam, aqueduct, and reservoir were finished in 1841, bringing water 40 miles from the Croton River to New York City. In commemoration, the Croton Fountain in City Hall Park, was turned on on October 14, 1842, and jetted water 50 feet into the air. A second fountain in Union Square was also connected to the system.

The first fountains were very simple, without sculpture, and simply spouted water up into the air. They no longer exist, though vestiges of the original water system remain.

In 1848, Boston completed its own new water system, an aqueduct from Lake Cochituate 20 miles (32 km) to the Boston Common, where the first fountain was located. A parade and festival were held to mark the fountain's opening on October 25, 1848. The ceremony included schoolchildren singing an ode written by American poet James Russell Lowell for the event. The ode began:

"My name is Water: I have sped through strange dark ways untried before, By pure desire of friendship led, Cochituate's Ambassador: He sends four gifts by me, Long life, health, peace, and purity."

In contrast to the first American fountains, which were simple and functional, in the 1850s, more decorative fountains were constructed as part of a nationwide effort to beautify American cities by building parks, squares, and fountains inspired by European models.

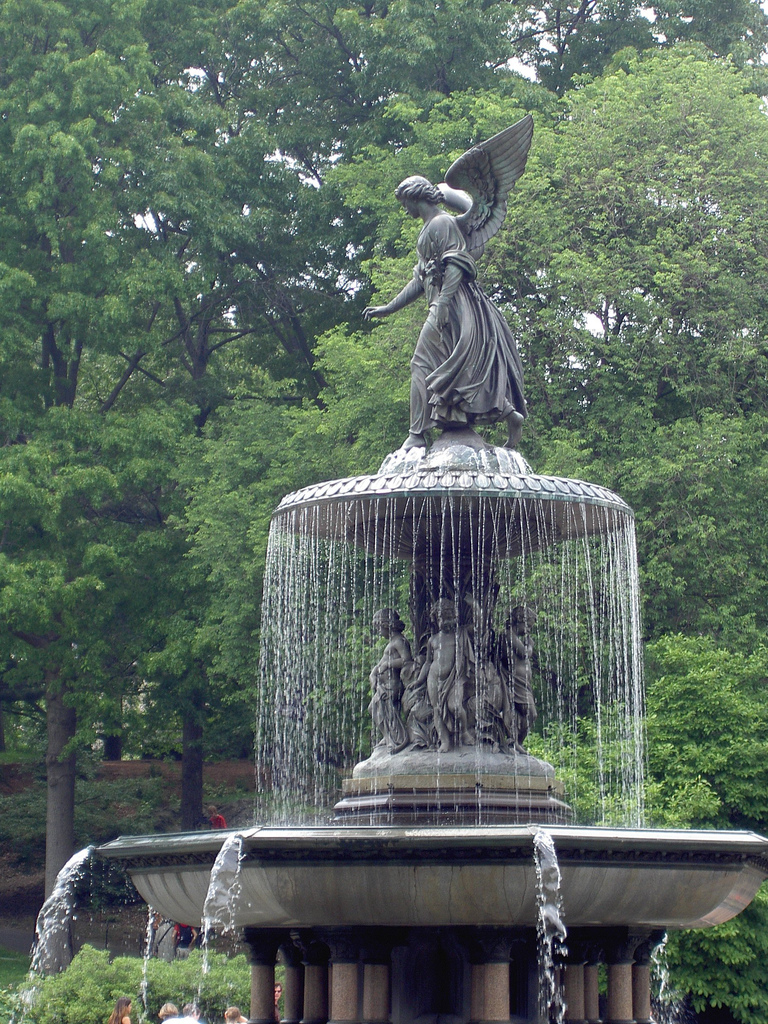
Bethesda Fountain in Central Park, New York (1873)

For example, the Bethesda Fountain was created to adorn New York City's new Central Park, which project had been begun in 1858 by Frederick Law Olmsted and Calvert Vaux, to create a vast natural landscape in the heart of the city. In the middle of the park was one formal element: a mall adorned with elm trees and a terrace with views over a lake. In 1863, the park commissioners decided to build a monumental fountain for the central basin in the middle of the mall. The sculptor was a little-known American artist, Emma Stebbins, whose brother was the head of the New York Stock Exchange and President of the Board of Commissioners, who lobbied on her behalf. Her fountain was based on the biblical verse from the Gospel of Saint John, in which an angel touched, or "troubled", the waters of the Pool of Bethesda in Jerusalem, giving it healing powers. She wrote about the fountain: "We have no less healing, comfort and purification freely sent to us through the blessed gift of pure, wholesome water, which to all the countless homes of this great city comes like an angel visitant." It was criticized by some writers when it was opened in 1873: the New York Times called it "a feebly-pretty idealess thing", but gradually the fountain became a popular favorite, featured in many films and in recent times in Tony Kushner's play Angels in America.

The Tyler Davidson Fountain in the city centre of Cincinnati has never ceased maintenance of its filtration and treatment accessories that are housed in the four waterspout figures on the structures perimeter. These waterspouts initially provided a very reliable and trustworthy source of potable water to the urban workforce, and though demand has lessened, the local Water Works continues its upkeep.

== 1900-2000 ==
Fountains built in the United States between 1900 and 1950 mostly followed European models and classical styles. For example:

- The handsome Samuel Francis Dupont Memorial Fountain (aka Dupont Circle Fountain), in Dupont Circle, Washington D.C., was designed and created by Henry Bacon and Daniel Chester French, the architect and sculptor of the Lincoln Memorial, in 1921, in a pure neoclassical style.
- The Buckingham Fountain in Grant Park, Chicago was one of the first American fountains to use powerful modern pumps to shoot water as high as 150 feet (46 meters) into the air.
- The Fountain of Prometheus, with sculpture by Paul Manship, built at Rockefeller Center in New York City in 1933, was the first American fountain in the Art-Deco style.

After World War II, fountains in the United States became more varied in form. Some, like the Vaillancourt Fountain in San Francisco (1971), were pure works of sculpture. The modernist French-Canadian Armand Vaillancourt built his monumental fountain at Embarcadero Plaza in San Francisco in a cubist style, though it was intended as a political statement - the official title is "Quebec Libre!".

Other fountains, like the Franklin Roosevelt Memorial Waterfall (1997), by architect Lawrence Halprin, were designed as landscapes to illustrate themes. This fountain is part of the Franklin Delano Roosevelt Memorial in Washington D.C., which has four outdoor "rooms" illustrating FDR's presidency. Each "room" contains a cascade or waterfall; the cascade in the third room illustrates the turbulence of the years of the World War II. Halprin wrote at an early stage of the design; "the whole environment of the memorial becomes sculpture: to touch, feel, hear and contact - with all the senses."

One of the most unusual modern American fountains is the Civil Rights Memorial (1989) at the Southern Poverty Law Center in Montgomery, Alabama, designed by Maya Lin, the designer of the Vietnam Veterans Memorial in Washington D.C. The Civil Rights Memorial fountain features a low elliptical black granite table, with a thin surface of water flowing over the surface, over the inscribed names of civil rights leaders who died, illustrating the quotation from Martin Luther King Jr.: "...Until justice rolls down like waters and righteousness like a mighty stream." Visitors are invited to touch the names through the water. "The water is as slow as I could get it," Lin wrote. "It remains very still until you touch it. Your hand carves ripples, which transform and alter the piece, just as reading the words completes the piece."

== Significant fountains in the United States ==
| Name | Image | Location | Architect(s) | Sculptor(s) | Year completed | Notes |
|---|---|---|---|---|---|---|
| Bartholdi Fountain; Fountain of Light and Water | | United States Botanical Gardens, Washington, D.C. | | Frédéric Auguste Bartholdi | Philadelphia, 1876; Washington, D.C., 1878 | Exhibited at the 1876 Centennial Exposition. First fountain in the United States illuminated by gaslight. |
| Bethesda Fountain | | Central Park, Manhattan, New York City | Calvert Vaux | Emma Stebbins | 1873 | "Angel of the Waters" |
| Buckingham Fountain | | Chicago, Illinois | Edward H. Bennett | Marcel F. Loyau | 1927 | The central jet shoots up 150 feet (46 m). |
| Centennial Fountain; Nicholas J. Melas Centennial Fountain | | Chicago, Illinois | Lohan Associates | | 1989 | The jet shoots across the span of the Chicago River. |
| Civil Rights Memorial | | Montgomery, Alabama | Maya Lin | | 1989 | Water spills over a stylized table inscribed with a list of significant events in the Civil Rights Movement. |
| Coleman Memorial Fountain | | Sacramento, California | | Ralph Stackpole | 1927 | |
| Columbus Fountain; Christopher Columbus Memorial Fountain | | Union Station, Washington, D.C. | Daniel Burnham | Lorado Taft | 1912 | "The Spirit of Discovery" evokes the figurehead of a ship. |
| Corning Fountain | | Bushnell Park, Hartford, Connecticut | | J. Massey Rhind | 1899 | The hart (deer) is an allegorical figure of the City of Hartford. |
| Court of Neptune Fountain | | Thomas Jefferson Building, Library of Congress, Washington, D.C. | John L. Smithmeyer; Paul J. Pelz; Edward Pearce Casey | Roland Hinton Perry; Albert Weinert (relief sculpture) | 1895 | Thomas Jefferson Building |
| Depew Memorial Fountain | | Indianapolis, Indiana | Henry Bacon | Karl Bitter; Alexander Stirling Calder | 1919 | Bitter's maquette for the fountain. Following Bitter's 1915 death, Calder completed the sculpture work. |
| Donahue Memorial Fountain; The Mechanics Monument | | San Francisco, California | Willis Polk | Douglas Tilden | 1901 | The fountain survived the 1906 San Francisco earthquake. |
| Dupont Circle Fountain; Rear Admiral Samuel Francis Dupont Memorial Fountain | | Dupont Circle, Washington, D.C. | Henry Bacon | Daniel Chester French | 1921 | |
| Fort Worth Water Gardens | | Fort Worth, Texas | Philip Johnson; John Burgee | | 1974 | Visitors can walk within the fountain. |
| Fountain of Eternal Life; War Memorial Fountain | | Cleveland, Ohio | | Marshall Fredericks | 1964 | "Peace Arising from the Flames of War" |
| Fountain of the Centaurs and The Signing of the Treaty | | Jefferson City, Missouri | | Karl Bitter and A.A. Weinman | 1927 | |
| Fountain of the Great Lakes | | Art Institute of Chicago Garden, Chicago, Illinois | | Lorado Taft | 1913 | |
| Fountain Hills Fountain | | Fountain Lake, Fountain Hills, Arizona | | | 1970 | World's tallest fountain when built, the jet shoots up 562 feet (171 m). Now world's fourth-tallest fountain, and tallest operational fountain in the United States. |
| Fountain of the Rings | | Centennial Olympic Park, Atlanta, Georgia | EDAW, Inc. William Hobbs, Ltd. | | 1996 | Created for the 1996 Olympic Games. |
| Fountain of Time | | Chicago, Illinois | | Lorado Taft | 1922 | "Father Time" |
| Fountains of Bellagio | | Bellagio Resort, Las Vegas, Nevada | WET (Water Entertainment Technologies) | | 1998 | The fountain and light display is choreographed to music. |
| Gateway Geyser | | Malcolm W. Martin Memorial Park, East St. Louis, Illinois | | | 1995 | Was the tallest fountain in the United States, and second-tallest in the world. Located on the opposite side of the Mississippi River from the Gateway Arch, its jet could shoot up 630 ft (190 m), the same height as the arch. No longer in operation. |
| LaFayette Fountain | | Lafayette, Indiana | | Lorado Taft | 1882 | This was the first of Taft's many fountains. |
| Littlefield Fountain | | University of Texas at Austin, Austin, Texas | Morison & Walker; Paul Cret | Pompeo Coppini; Waldine Tauch | 1933 | |
| Longwood Gardens | | Kennett Square, Pennsylvania | | | Open Air Theatre, 1914; Italian Water Garden, 1927; Main Fountain Garden, 1931 | Fountain show in the Open Air Theatre. |
| Meeting of the Waters Fountain; The Wedding of the Waters | | Aloe Plaza, Saint Louis, Missouri | | Carl Milles | 1940 | Detail. |
| National World War II Memorial | | National Mall, Washington, D.C. | Friedrich St. Florian | Raymond Kaskey; James Peniston | 2004 | From above. |
| Jesse Clyde Nichols Memorial Fountain | | Country Club Plaza, Kansas City, Missouri | McKim, Mead & White | Henri-Léon Gréber | 1910; 1960 | The fountain was created for "Harbor Hill," the Clarence Mackay estate in Roslyn, New York. Four larger-than-life equestrian figures represent great rivers: "The Rhine," "The Seine," "The Volga," and "The Mississippi."; It was disassembled, transported, and installed in Kansas City in 1960. |
| Piazza d'Italia | | New Orleans, Louisiana | Charles Williard Moore; Perez Architects | | 1978 | At night. |
| Point State Park Fountain | | Point State Park, Pittsburgh, Pennsylvania | | | 1970 | The jet shoots 150 feet. |
| Prometheus Fountain | | Rockefeller Center, Manhattan, New York City | Raymond Hood | Paul Manship | 1933 | With ice skaters. |
| Pulitzer Fountain | | Grand Army Plaza, 5th Avenue & Central Park South, Manhattan, New York City | Thomas Hastings | Karl Bitter; Isidore Konti; Karl Gruppe | 1916 | "Pomona"; Following Bitter's 1915 death, Konti and Gruppe completed the sculpture work. |
| Rackham Memorial Fountain | | Detroit Zoo, Royal Oak, Michigan | | Corrado Parducci | 1939 | |
| Franklin Delano Roosevelt Memorial | | West Potomac Park, Washington, D.C. | Lawrence Halprin | | 1997 | |
| Russell Ager Memorial Fountain | | Detroit, Michigan | Henry Bacon | Daniel Chester French | 1921 | |
| The Sciences and The Arts Fountains | | Jefferson City, Missouri | | Robert Ingersoll Aitken | 1924 | |
| Scott Memorial Fountain | | Belle Isle Park, Detroit, Michigan | Cass Gilbert | Herbert Adams | 1925 | The lowest basin has a diameter of 510 ft (160 m). |
| Soldiers' and Sailors' Monument | | Indianapolis, Indiana | Bruno Schmitz | Rudolf Schwarz; Frederick MacMonnies; George Brewster; Nicholas Geiger | 1888 | "War," designed by Frederick William MacMonnies, carved by Rudolf Schwarz. |
| Swann Memorial Fountain; Fountain of the Three Rivers | | Logan Circle, Philadelphia, Pennsylvania | Wilson Eyre | Alexander Stirling Calder | 1924 | "Allegorical Figure of the Schuylkill River" |
| Thatcher Memorial Fountain | | City Park, Denver, Colorado | J.R.M. Morrison | Lorado Taft | 1918 | |
| Tyler Davidson Fountain | | Fountain Square, Cincinnati, Ohio | | August von Kreling; Ferdinand von Miller; Fritz von Miller; Ferdinand Freiherr von Miller | 1871 | "The Genius of Water"; The fountain was designed by August von Kreling in the 1840s for King Ludwig of Bavaria, but never built. It was cast in Germany in 1870, and shipped to the United States. |
| Unisphere | | Flushing Meadows Park, Queens, New York City | Gilmore D. Clarke | | 1964 | The Unisphere was the centerpiece of the 1964 New York World's Fair. |
| Vaillancourt Fountain "Quebec Libre!" | | Justin Herman Plaza, San Francisco, California | | Armand Vaillancourt | 1971 | The plaza from above. |

== See also ==
- Drinking fountains in the United States
- Drinking fountains in Philadelphia

== Bibliography ==
- Marilyn Symmes (editor), Fountains-Splash and Spectacle- Water and Design from the Renaissance to the Present. Thames and Hudson, in cooperation with the Cooper-Hewitt National Design Museum of the Smithsonian Institution. (1998).
