= Lion (Perry) =

Sculpture by Roland Hinton Perry in San Francisco, California, U.S.

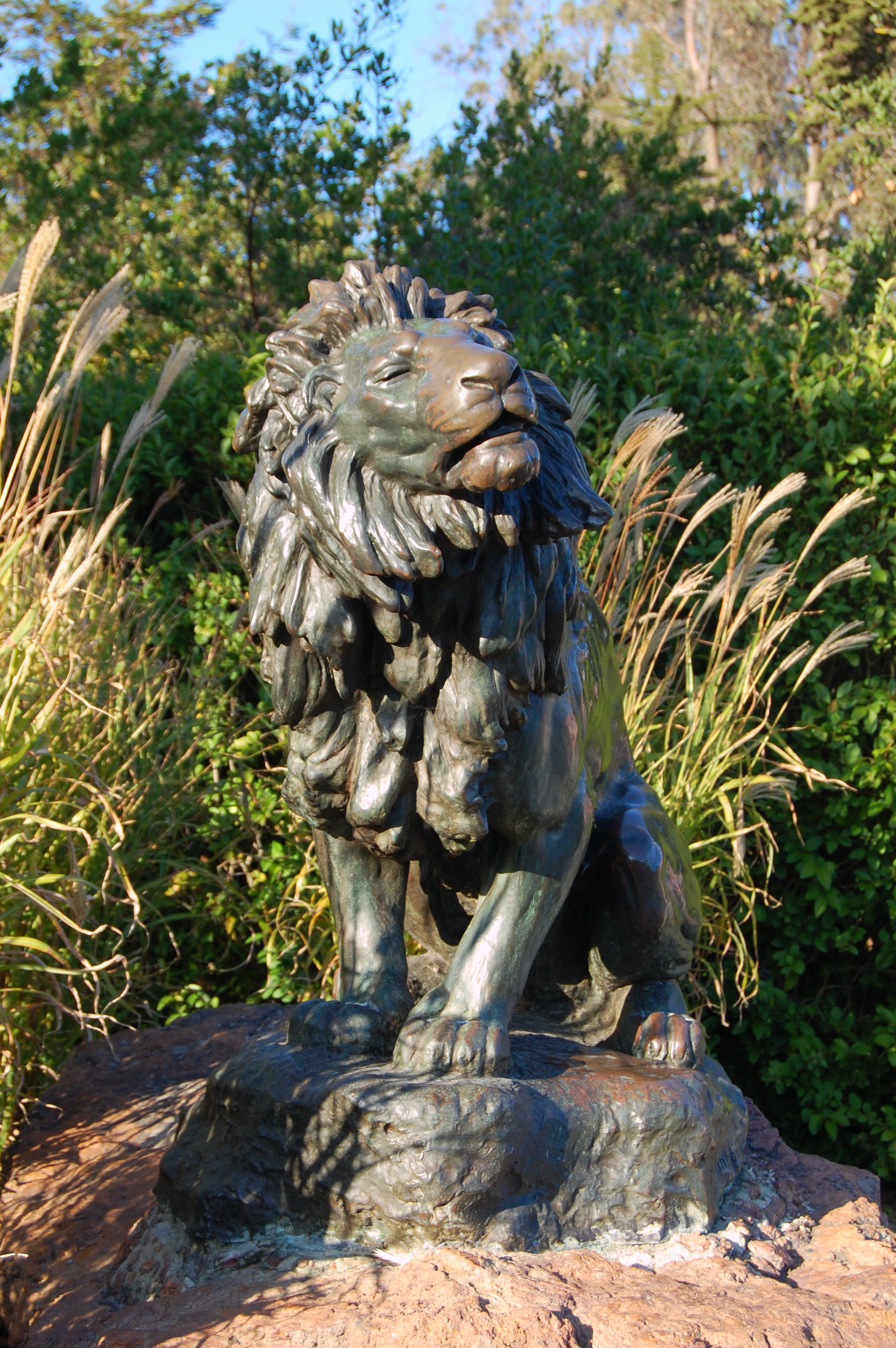
- The statue in 2019
- Artist: Roland Hinton Perry
- Location: Golden Gate Park, San Francisco, California, U.S.
- 37°46′18″N 122°28′2.6″W

Lion is a sculpture by Roland Hinton Perry, installed in San Francisco's Golden Gate Park, in the U.S. state of California.
