= Nightmare Elk =

2020 metal sculpture temporarily installed in Portland, Oregon, U.S.

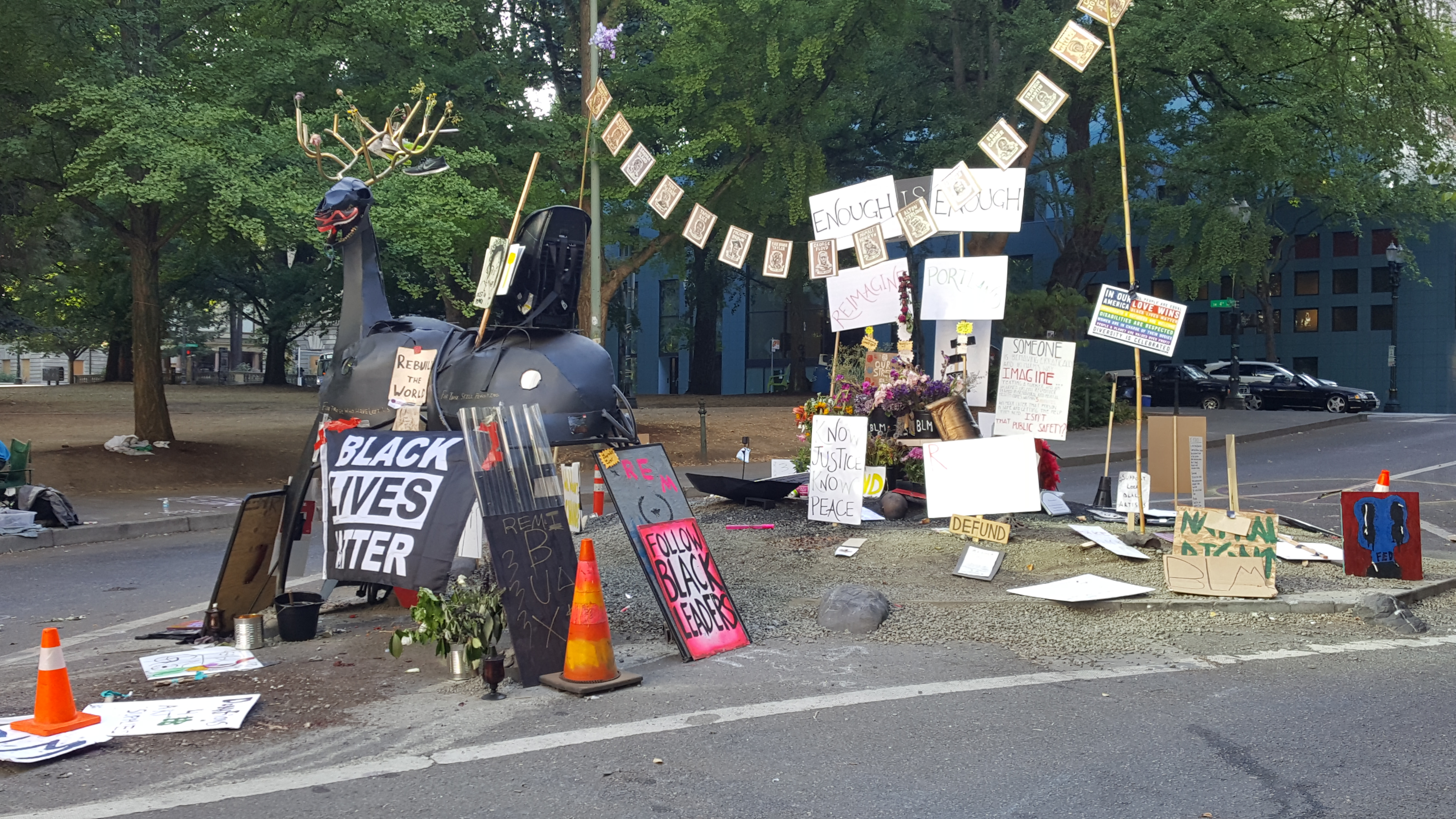
- The statue in August 2020
- Year: 2020
- Medium: Metal sculpture
- Location: Portland, Oregon, United States
- 45°30′57″N 122°40′39″W

The "Nightmare Elk" was a metal sculpture of an elk, temporarily installed in Portland, Oregon.

== Description ==
The statue which became known as the "nightmare elk" was crafted in metal by an unknown artist. Andrew D. Jankowski and Safiyah Maurice of Oregon ArtsWatch said the sculpture had "a Louise Bourgeois death metal aesthetic".

== History ==
The makeshift sculpture was erected in downtown Portland by demonstrators in July 2020, during the George Floyd protests. The statue replaced the Thompson Elk Fountain, a 1900 bronze sculpture and fountain by Roland Hinton Perry which became a target of graffiti and fires during the protests.

=== Removal and reactions ===
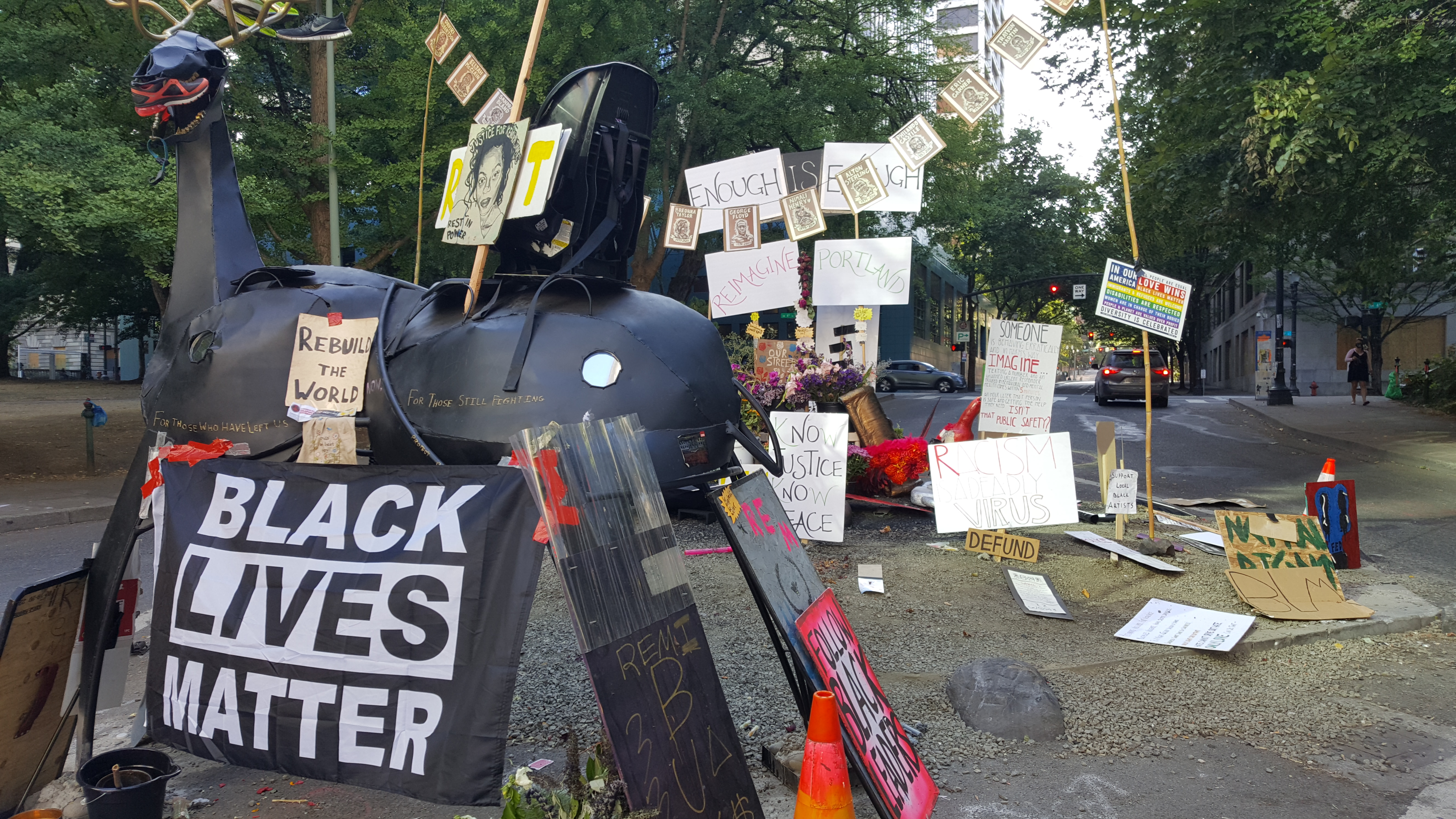
The statue

On the morning of October 10, 2020, a crew led by Patriot Prayer supporter Chandler Pappas removed the statue at approximately 9am. Pappas approved and began planning the removal a few days prior. There was little resistance from others during the act; only one man who had been sleeping nearby shouted and watched as the group of 8–10 people easily lifted the sculpture, which was not anchored.

Following the statue's removal, Patriot Prayer posted two messages to Twitter. The first had a photograph of supporters posing with the elk in a trailer bed and said, "He is registered to vote and will now be voting for Trump". Some of the group members were shown flashing the OK gesture, in reference to the debunked belief that it was a symbol of white nationalism. The second Twitter post showed a voter registration sheet for "elk Nightmare" and said, "The evil elk is now registered to vote". Pappas insisted the voter registration was not actually submitted for election purposes. He said Patriot Prayer was "having fun" and called the statue removal "a little push back to antifa".

Believing antifa supporters erected the sculpture after setting fire to the Thompson Elk, Pappas said, "There can't be a double standard. We toed the line. That elk is just trash so all I really did was clean up trash." He also said the makeshift elk was removed "as a political statement" and the hand gestures were meant "to antagonize" people "who don't know any better". Pappas said the message was directed at Kate Brown and Ted Wheeler, the governor of Oregon and mayor of Portland, respectively, as well as other city officials. According to The Oregonian's Maxine Bernstein, "Social media lit up with fans and critics of the elk escapade." PDX Frontline Alerts, a Twitter account used to provide updates on the protests, called the statue a "memorial for Black victims of police violence" and accused Patriot Prayer of "bragging" about the removal. Pappas told The Oregonian, "That's not the last you'll see of the elk."

=== Replacement and subsequent appearance ===
The metal elk statue was replaced with another sculpture of an elk made of branches, duct tape, and wood pallets.

In November 2020, the "nightmare elk" appeared at a rally in support of Donald Trump in Salem, Oregon.

== See also ==
- 2020 in art
- Black Lives Matter art in Portland, Oregon
