= Thompson Elk Fountain =

Sculpture in Portland, Oregon

- Elk Fountain, David P. Thompson Monument
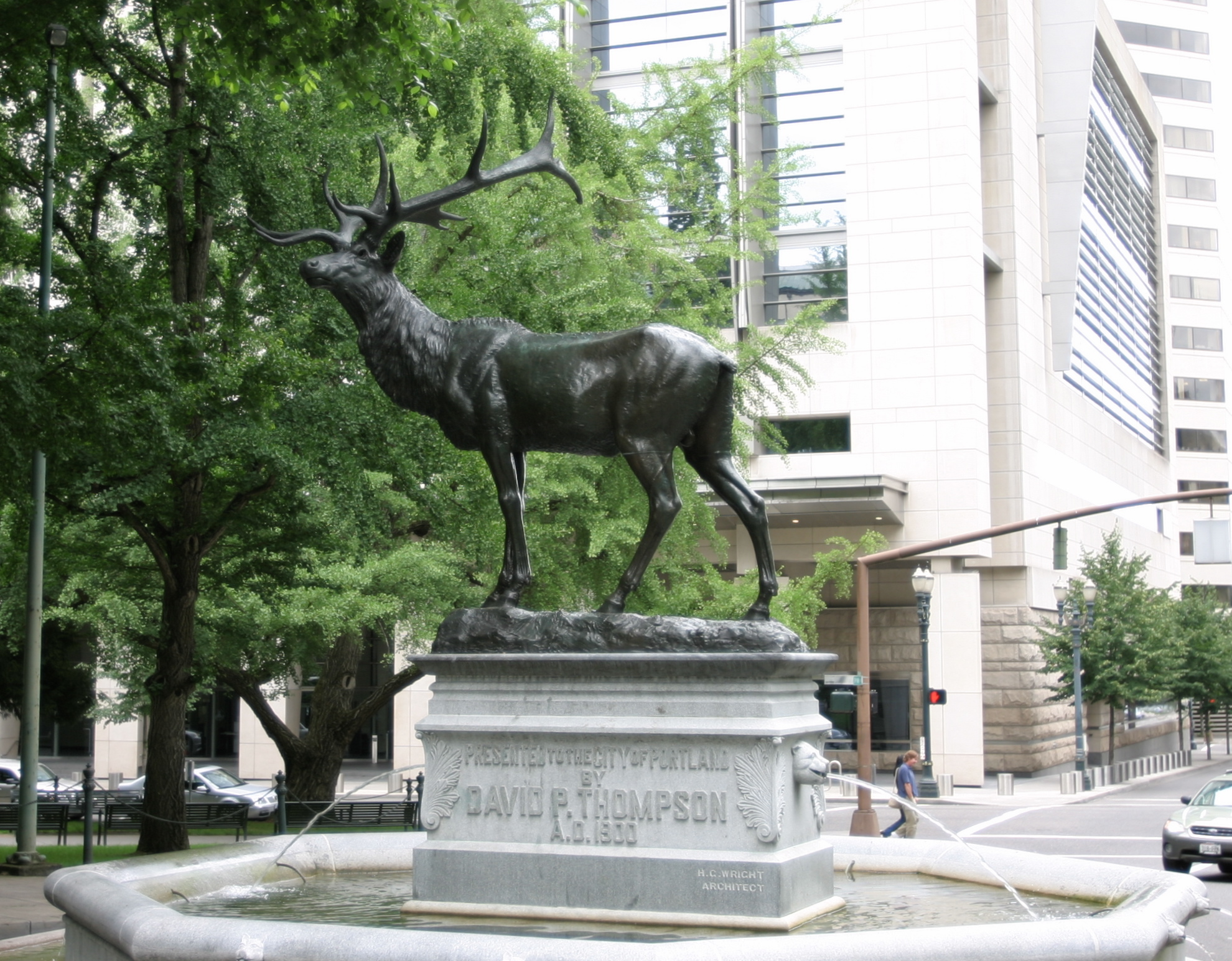
- The sculpture in 2006
- Artist: Roland Hinton Perry (statue); H.G. Wright (fountain)
- Year: 1900
- Type: Fountain with Sculpture
- Medium: Bronze sculpture; granite fountain
- Subject: Elk
- Designation: Portland Historic Landmark
- Condition: Restored (April 2026)
- Location: Portland, Oregon, United States; 45.515721°N 122.677485°W
- Owner: City of Portland, Oregon

Thompson Elk Fountain, also known as the David P. Thompson Fountain, David P. Thompson Monument, Elk Fountain, the Thompson Elk, or simply Elk, is a historic fountain and bronze sculpture by American artist Roland Hinton Perry. The fountain with its statue was donated to the city of Portland, Oregon, United States, in 1900 for display in Downtown Portland's Plaza Blocks. It is owned by the City of Portland.

The monument became a gathering place for demonstrations by George Floyd protesters, who lit several fires in the troughs along the base in July 2020. The damaged bronze elk statue was removed for cleaning and safekeeping on July 2, 2020. The stone fountain was removed on July 17, 2020, after the Regional Arts & Cultural Council determined there was severe damage to the stone and basin of the fountain. In 2024, the elk statue was repaired and construction on the fountain's replacement began on July 7, 2025. The statue and restored base were unveiled on April 9, 2026.

== Description ==
Elk, installed on Southwest Main between 3rd and 4th Avenues between Chapman Square and Lownsdale Square in Portland's Plaza Blocks, features a bronze sculpture of an elk, resting on a granite base within an octagon-shaped basin. The statue and base is 9 feet (2.7 m) tall; the basin measures approximately 3 ft. 3 in. x 25 ft. x 8 ft.

== History ==
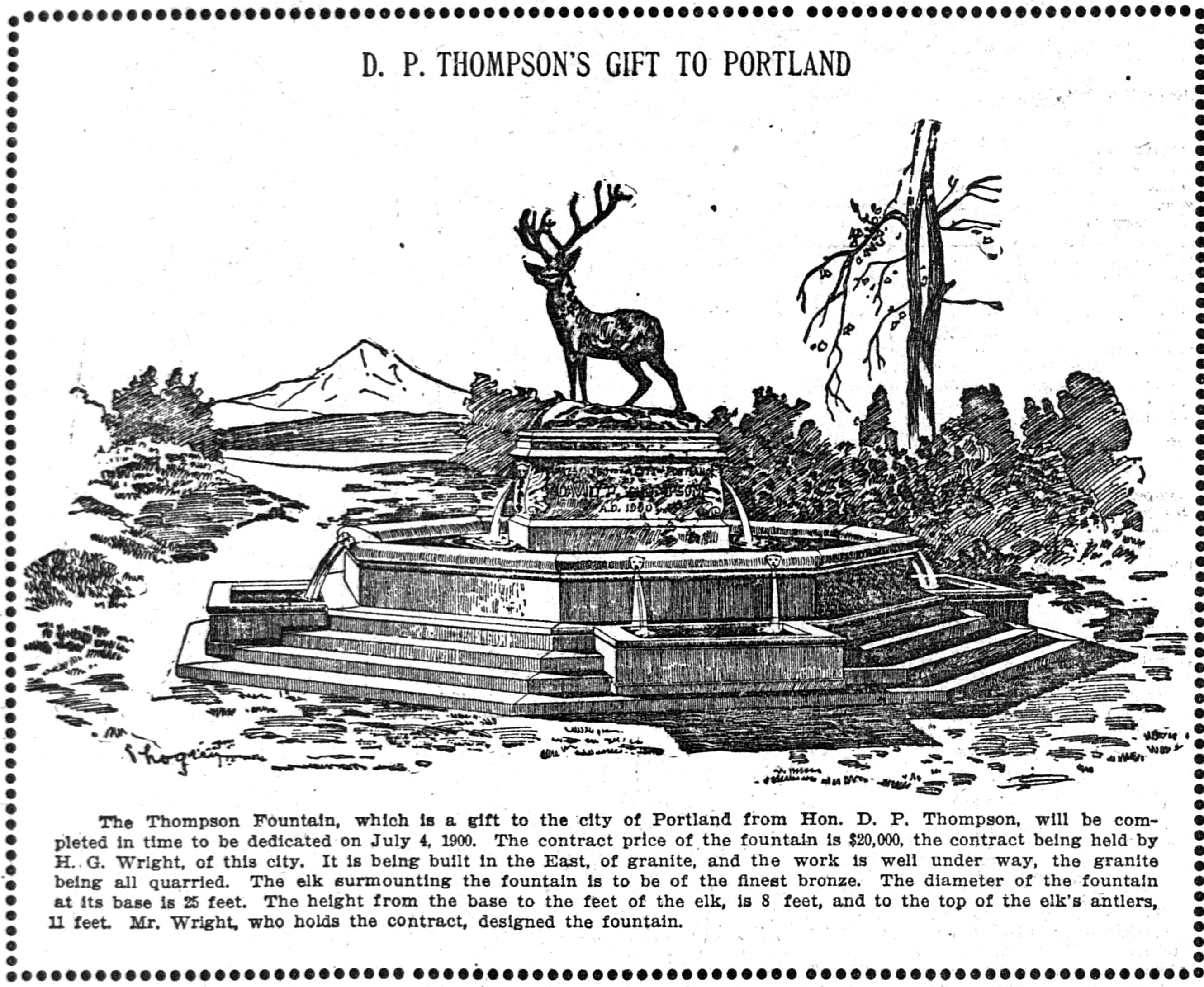
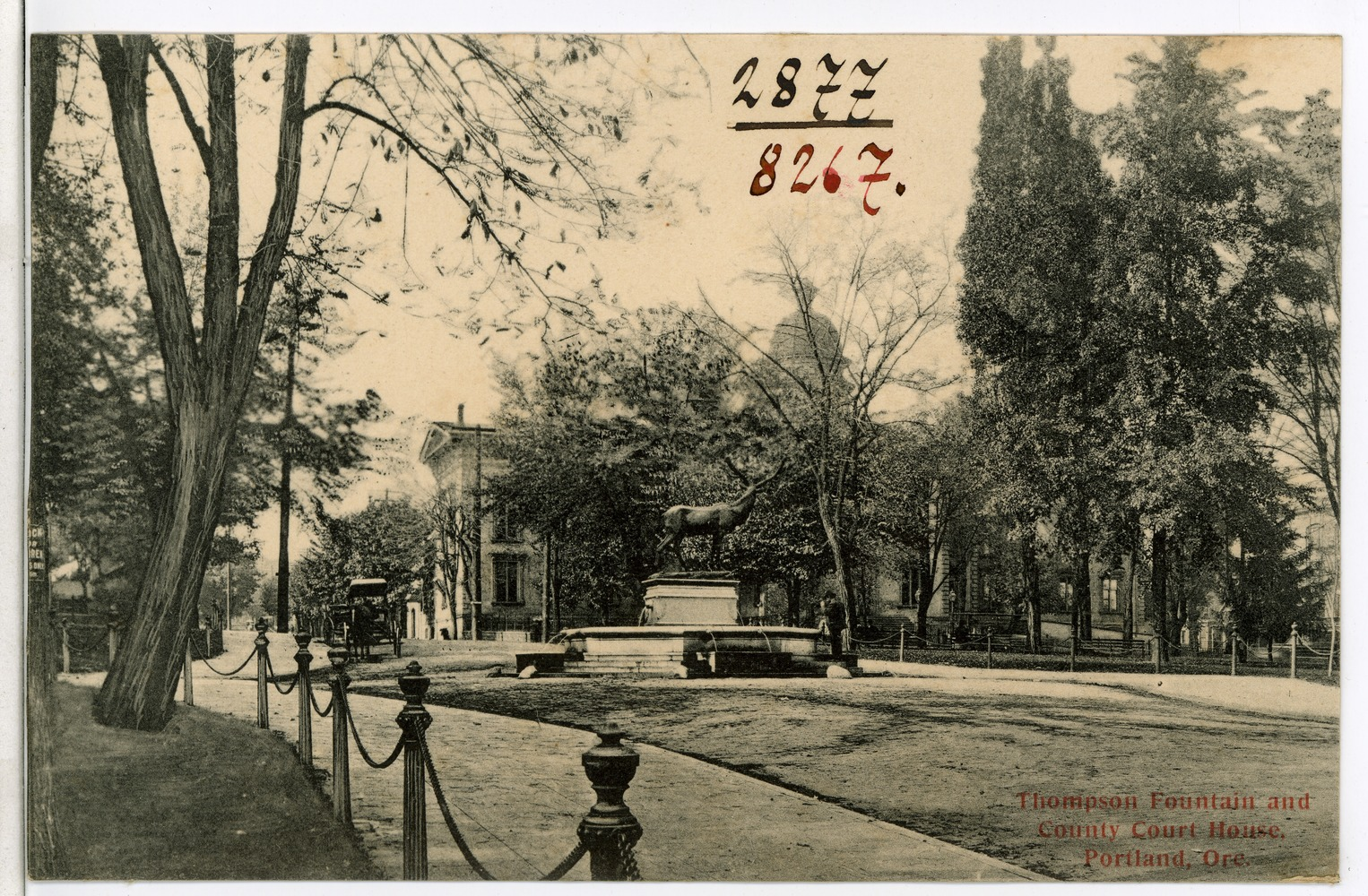
Top: The Oregonian, 1900; Bottom: The fountain depicted in a 1906 postcard

The monument was designed by Roland Hinton Perry, the sculptor of the Court of Neptune Fountain at the Library of Congress and Commonwealth, the statue atop the dome of the Pennsylvania State Capitol. The fountain and bronze sculpture was donated by former Portland mayor David P. Thompson in 1900 to commemorate the elk that once lived in the area.

The project was completed within a budget of $20,000 under the direction of designer E.G. Wright. Constructed of Barre Granite, the fountain design specified a 25 feet (7.6 m) diameter and 8 feet (2.4 m) high base. Wright had planned to complete the monument in time for a Fourth of July dedication to coincide with a city street carnival, but delays from removing nearby trees, widening Main Street, and connecting city water pipe forced Wright to delay completion of the monument. The 6,800-pound (3,100 kg) Elk was lifted into position in late August, and the Thompson Fountain was finished the first week of September 1900. A carnival sponsored by the Portland Elks Club began that week, and The Oregonian informed its readers, "this is not a carnival elk." According to the city, the Exalted Order of Elks refused to dedicate it because they considered the statue "a monstrosity of art." A reporter for The Oregonian in 2020 explained that, "part of the problem might have been that [the Perry sculpture] didn't quite capture the animal found in Oregon's wilds," as it depicts neither an Olympic elk nor a Rocky Mountain elk.

In 1974, Thompson's Elk and the Plaza Blocks were designated as Historic Landmarks by the city's Historic Landmarks Commission, under the name David P. Thompson Fountain. The sculpture appeared in Gus Van Sant's 1991 film My Own Private Idaho, where the elk was shown with a rider on it. The artwork was surveyed by the Smithsonian Institution's "Save Outdoor Sculpture!" program in 1993. The sculpture appears on the cover art for Portland metal band Agalloch's 2002 record, The Mantle.

=== Vandalism and removal ===
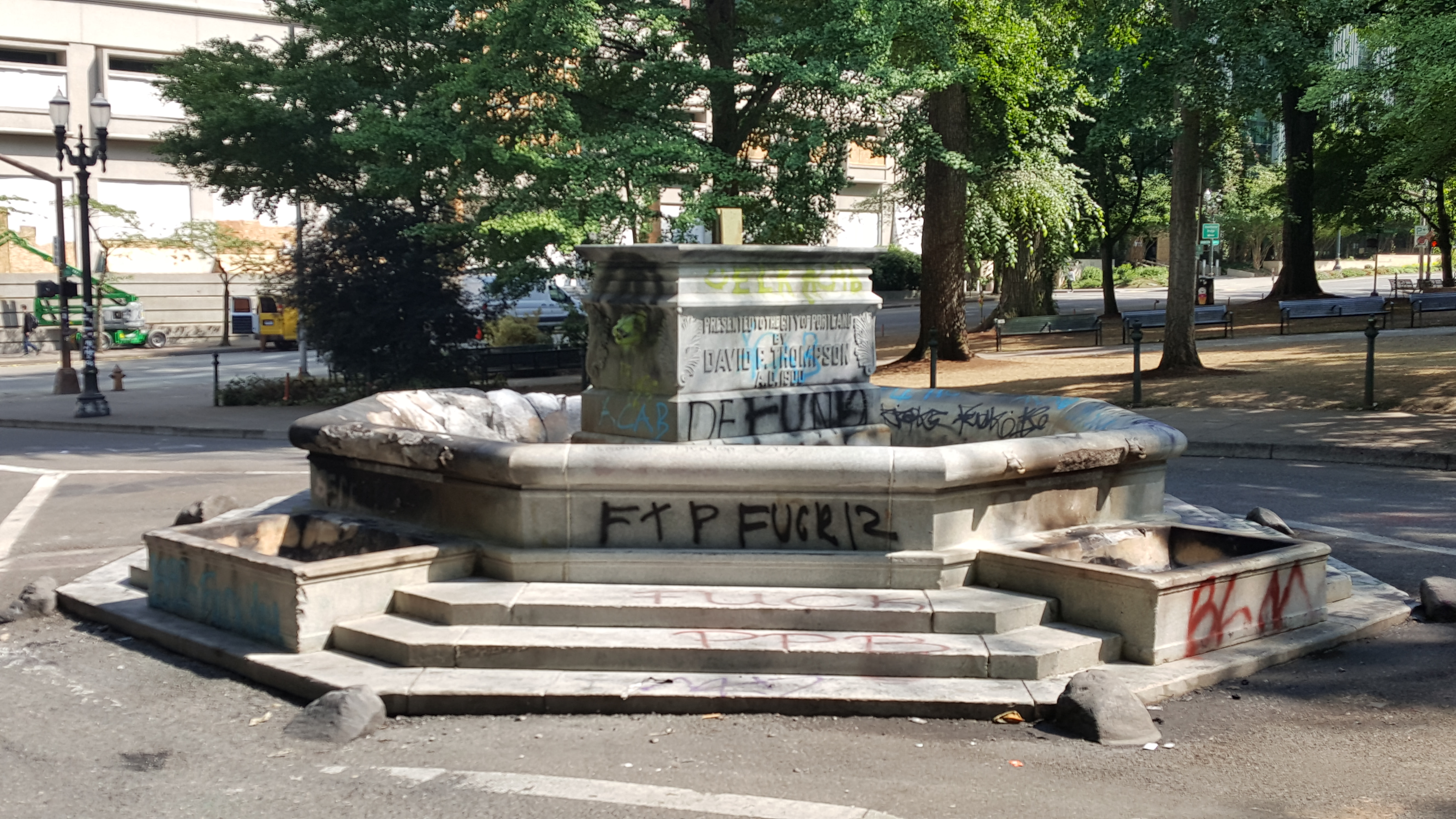
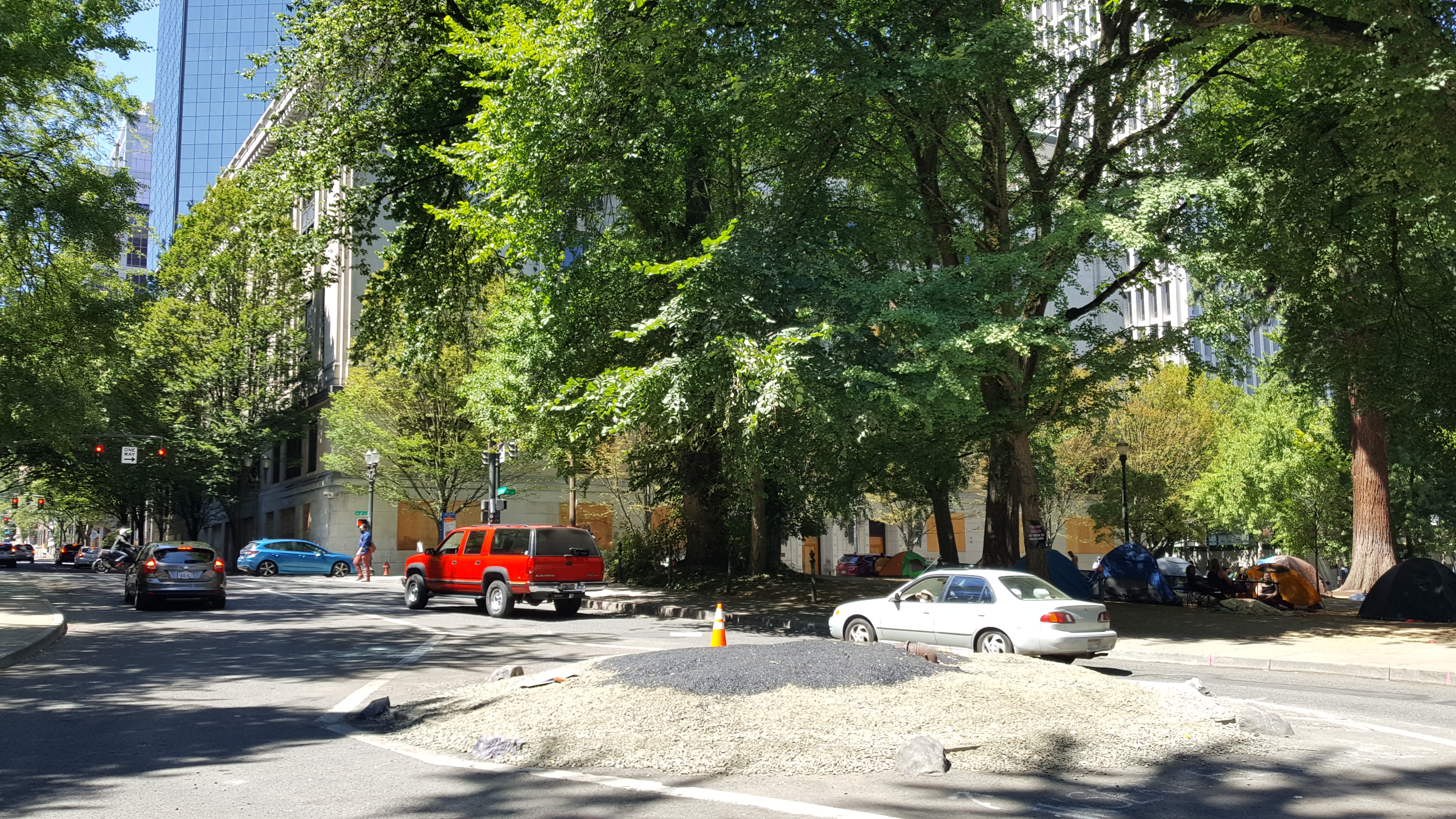
Top: Fountain with removed statue, July 2, 2020; bottom: removed fountain, July 25, 2020

Over the years, the statue has been vandalized many times. The elk was vandalized during the Occupy Portland protests (2011), and had the antlers repaired in early 2012. The statue was tagged with anti-Trump messages in 2016.

On July 1, 2020, during the George Floyd protests, people protesting police violence built bonfires in two planter boxes beneath the elk statue. The resulting structural damage to the granite base supporting the sculpture was deemed a safety hazard by the Regional Arts & Culture Council (RACC). The city removed the damaged bronze elk sculpture for cleaning on July 2. After RACC determined that the stone and basin of the fountain were severely damaged, it was removed on July 17. The status of the Elk fountain remained to be determined. Following the deployment of federal forces to Portland, it was reported that as of July 30, the bare mound where the statue once stood remained a site of activity, with demonstrators arguing for and against its continued use for bonfires. In late August, the statue was being kept "safely in storage".

=== Nightmare Elk ===
Following the removal and storage of the statue, an unknown artist erected what came to be known as the Nightmare Elk in its place. The statue was later taken by a crew led by a Patriot Prayer supporter.

=== Reinstallation ===
Construction on the fountain and statue replacement began on July 7, 2025. The statue was reinstalled on April 9, 2026, following a six-year absence.

== See also ==
- 1900 in art
- Elkhorn, Lee Kelly's 1979 deer sculpture at Portland's Catlin Gabel School
- Fountain for Company H (1914), also located in the Plaza Blocks
- List of monuments and memorials removed during the George Floyd protests
- Spanish–American War Soldier's Monument (1906), also located in the Plaza Blocks
