= Taft Bridge =

- Coordinates: 38°55′18″N 77°03′01″W

Characteristics
- Total length: 1,068 feet (326 m)
- William Howard Taft Bridge
- U.S. National Register of Historic Places
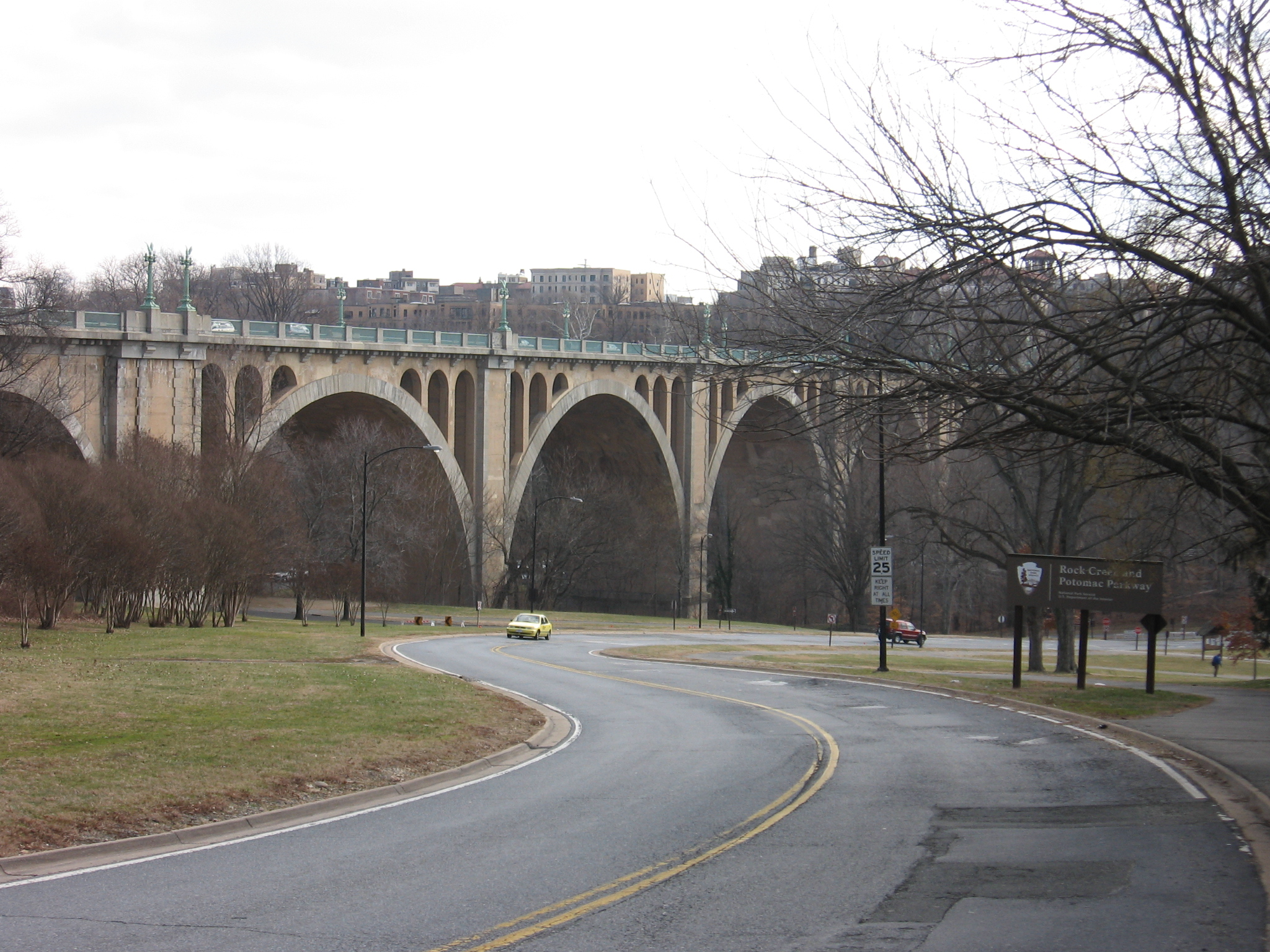

- Location within Washington, D.C.
- Location: Connecticut Avenue, NW over Rock Creek; Washington, D.C.
- Coordinates: 38°55′14″N 77°2′59″W
- Built: 1906
- Architect: Edward Pearce Casey
- Engineer: George S. Morison
- Architectural style: Classical Revival
- NRHP reference No.: 03000584
- Added to NRHP: July 3, 2003

Location
- Interactive map of Taft Bridge

The Taft Bridge (also known as the Connecticut Avenue Bridge or William Howard Taft Bridge) is a historic bridge located in the Northwest quadrant of Washington, D.C. Built in 1906, it carries Connecticut Avenue over the Rock Creek gorge, including Rock Creek and the Rock Creek and Potomac Parkway, connecting the neighborhoods of Woodley Park and Kalorama. It is named after former United States president and Supreme Court Chief Justice William Howard Taft, and sits to the southwest of the Duke Ellington Bridge.

Four statues of lions by sculptor Roland Hinton Perry, known as the Perry Lions, are placed in pairs at both ends of the bridge. On July 3, 2003, the Taft Bridge was added to the National Register of Historic Places.

== History ==
The Classical Revival bridge was built from 1897 to 1907. It was designed by engineer George S. Morison and architect Edward Pearce Casey. Construction was overseen by U.S. Army engineer Henry C. Newcomer. It is an arch bridge with unreinforced concrete arches and a reinforced concrete deck. The total length of the bridge between its abutments is 325.5 meters (1,068 ft). It has been called an "engineering tour de force" and the largest unreinforced concrete structure in the world. In 1931, the bridge was renamed in honor of U.S. President William Howard Taft, who frequently walked the bridge while Chief Justice of the United States.

During early planning for the Washington Metro in the 1960s, the Red Line was slated to run across the bridge to connect Dupont Circle and Woodley Park. Instead, the metro was built underground.

Between 2010 and 2022, half of the 26 people in the District of Columbia who died as a result of suicide on bridges died on Taft Bridge. In 2023 the District Department of Transportation began planning for the installation of new safety barriers on Taft Bridge. This decision was the result of grassroots advocacy efforts driven by Woodley Park resident, Chelsea Van Thof, after her partner, Peter Tripp, died by suicide on the bridge. The culmination of this initiative led to the construction of a temporary fence on the Taft Bridge in October 2025. Construction of a permanent suicide barrier is slated for completion in November 2026.

== Perry Lions ==
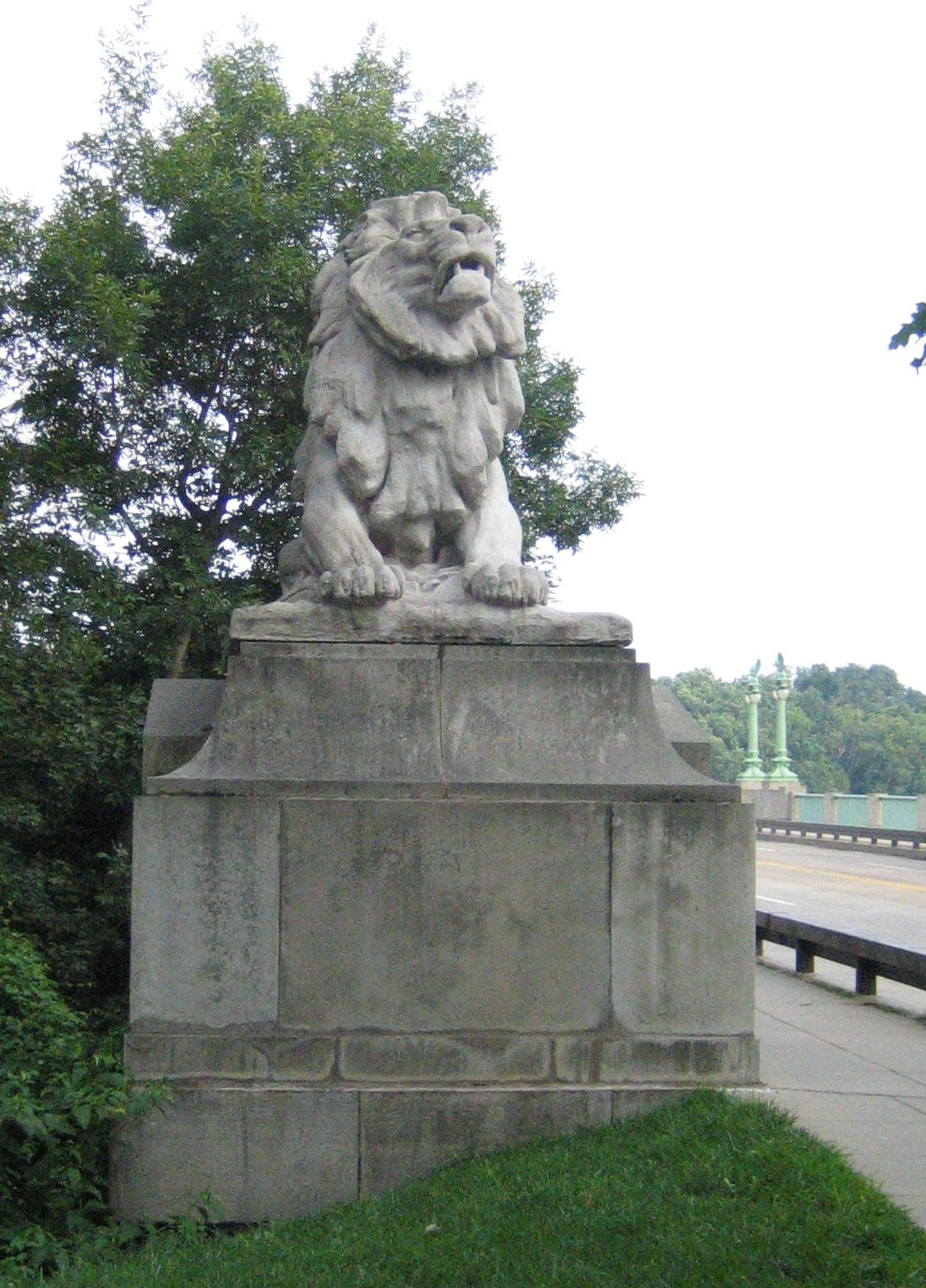
One of the Perry Lions, by Roland Hinton Perry, at the Northern end of the bridge

The bridge is "guarded" by four large male lions, two on each end of the bridge (each about 7 ft. x 6 ft. 6 in. x 13 ft.). Two of the lions rest on all fours with their heads tilted upwards and mouths slightly open while the other pair lie with their eyes closed, apparently sleeping. They were originally designed and sculpted by Roland Hinton Perry in 1906 out of cast concrete (the bridge as a whole is one of the first cast concrete bridges in the country) and were installed in 1907.

In 1964 the lions were restored and weatherproofed by Washington-based sculptor Renato Luccetti, although this restoration proved to be less than entirely successful. When a major rehabilitation of the bridge began in 1993, the lions, which were in very bad condition, were removed for further restoration. They are currently stored in the Air Rights Tunnel on southbound I-395. The sculptures were finally found to be beyond restoring.

The United States Commission of Fine Arts worked with the city in the late 1990s to oversee the production of the replacement lions that now sit on the bridge. The sculptor Reinaldo Lopez-Carrizo of Professional Restoration produced molds based on the existing sculptures and photographs, and used them to cast new concrete lion sculptures that were installed on the bridge in July and August 2000. The same molds were used to cast bronze lions installed at the main pedestrian entrance to the National Zoo farther north on Connecticut Avenue in 2002. The white lion in the lobby of the U.S. Commission of Fine Arts is a quarter-size replica from that effort.

== Bairstow Eagle Lampposts ==
Twenty-four lampposts are equally spaced along both sides of the Taft Bridge. Created by sculptor Ernest Bairstow in 1906, the lampposts are composed of concrete bases (about 5 feet high, 8 inches deep and four feet wide) with painted iron lampposts (about 17 feet high and 4 wide) set in them. The pedestals are decorated with garland and a fluted column featuring acanthus leaves at the top and bottom. Above the leaves is a horizontal bracket with two globes hanging from each side of the column. Each lamppost is topped with a painted iron eagle with its wings spread.

A replica of the Bairstow eagles is seen in a World War I monument in Middletown, Delaware.

== Gallery ==
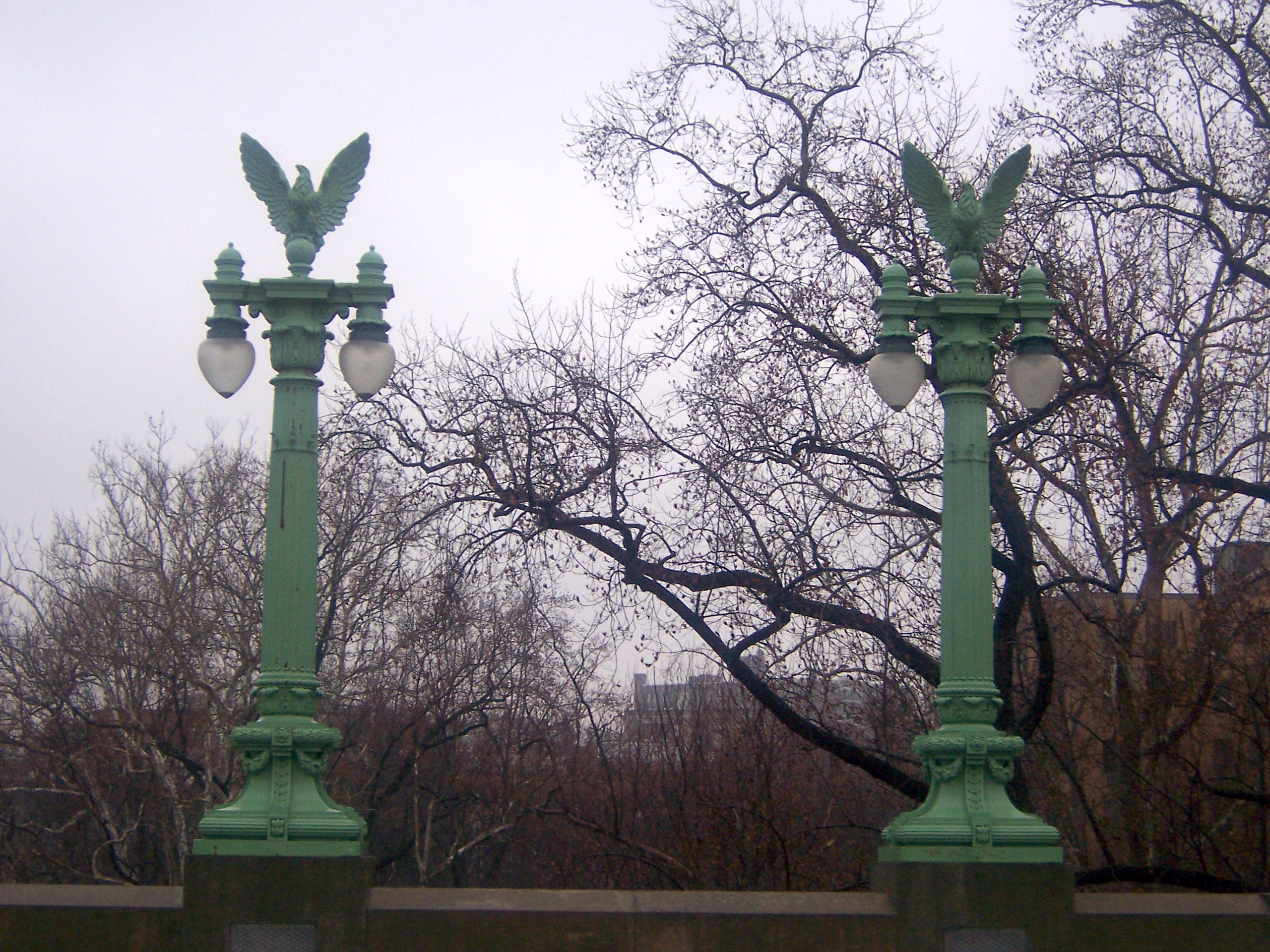
Eagle Lampposts

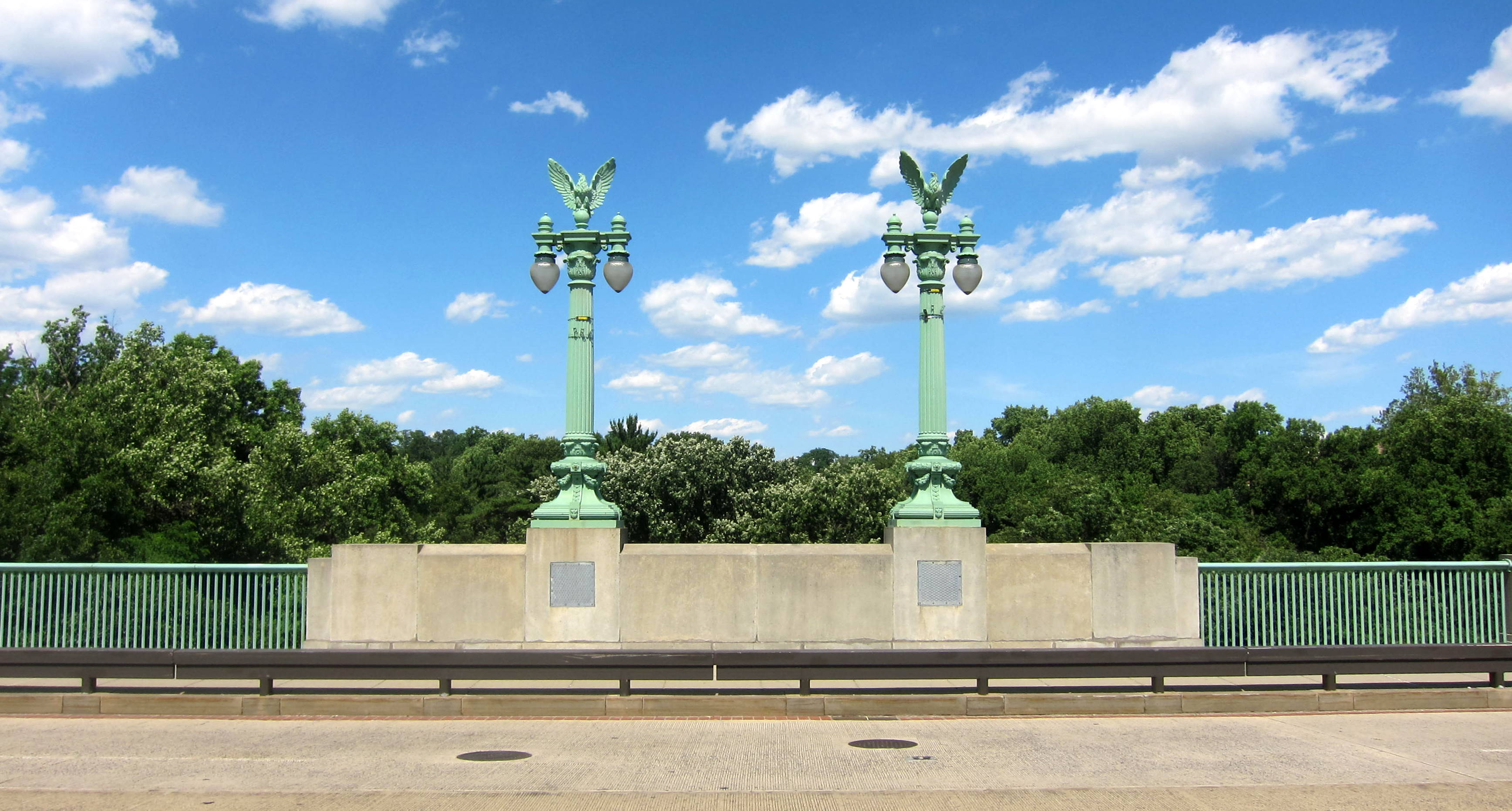
Eagle Lampposts

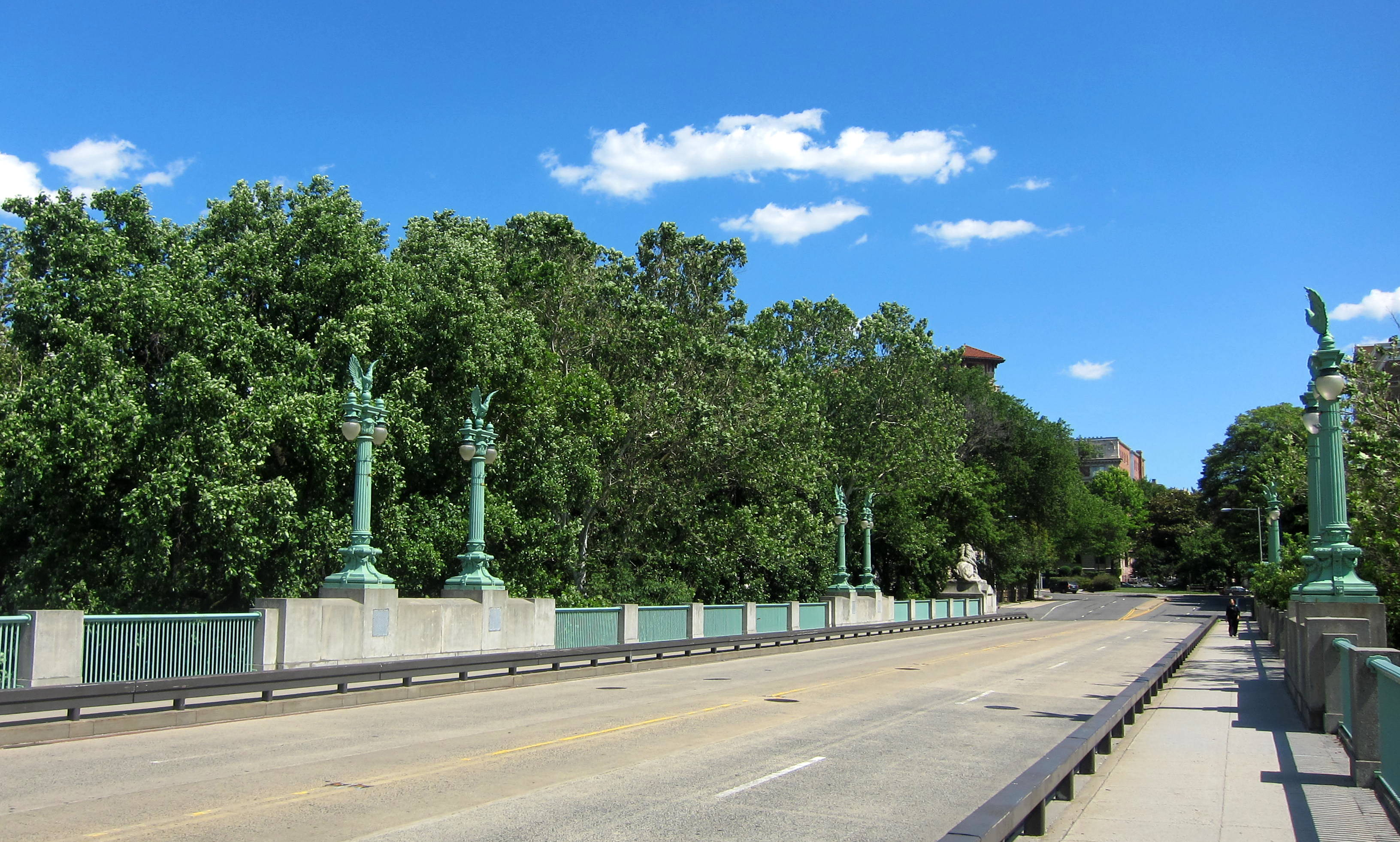
Bridge from the south with Lampposts

Perry Lion at the bridge

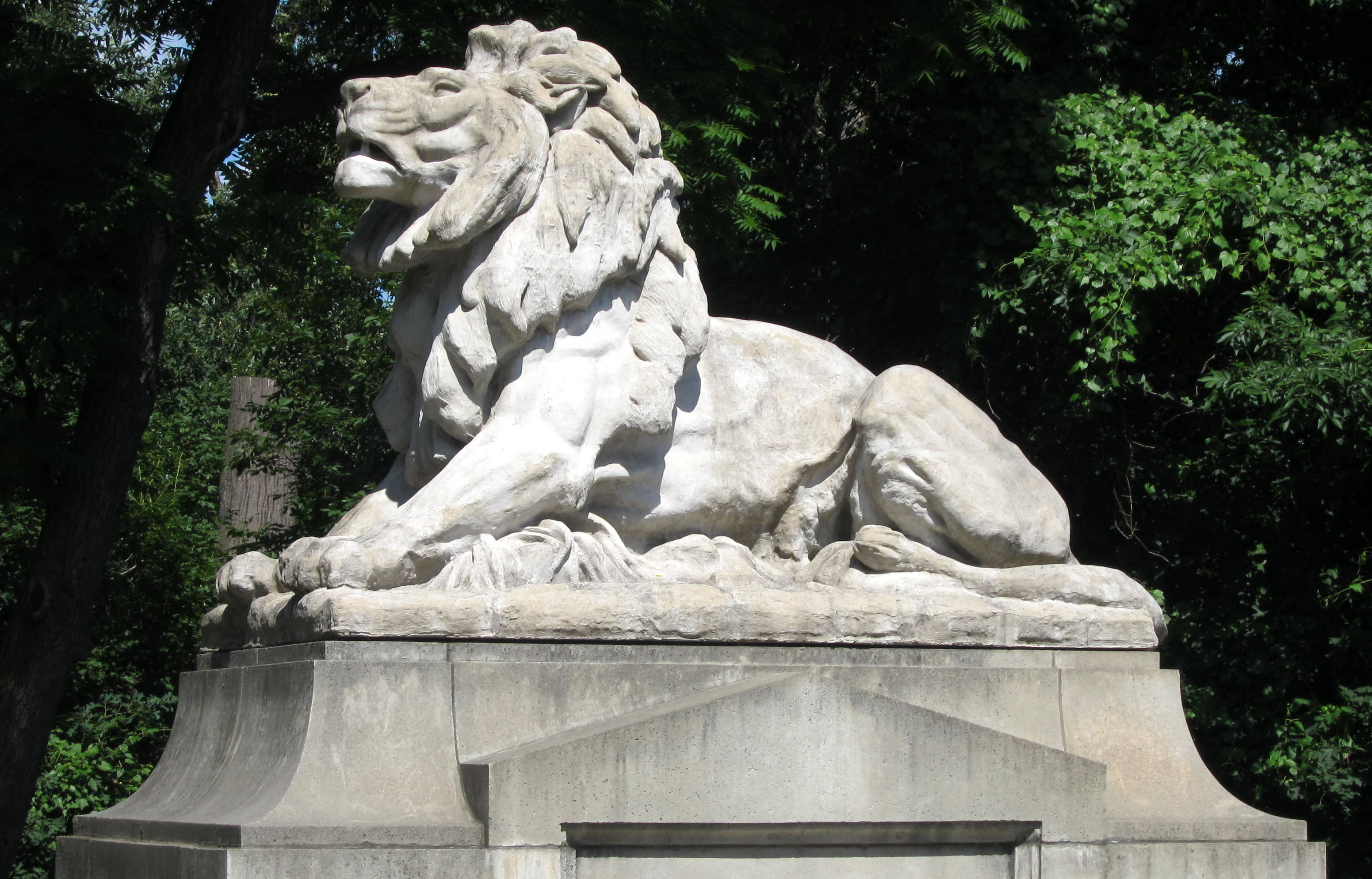
Full length view of a Perry Lion

Lion at the National Zoo

Lion at the National Zoo

== See also ==
- List of bridges documented by the Historic American Engineering Record in Washington, D.C.
- List of bridges on the National Register of Historic Places in Washington, D.C.
- National Register of Historic Places listings in the District of Columbia
- Architecture of Washington, D.C.
