= Commonwealth (statue) =

Statue by Roland Hinton Perry atop the Pennsylvania State Capitol

Coordinates: 40.26435°N 76.88356°W

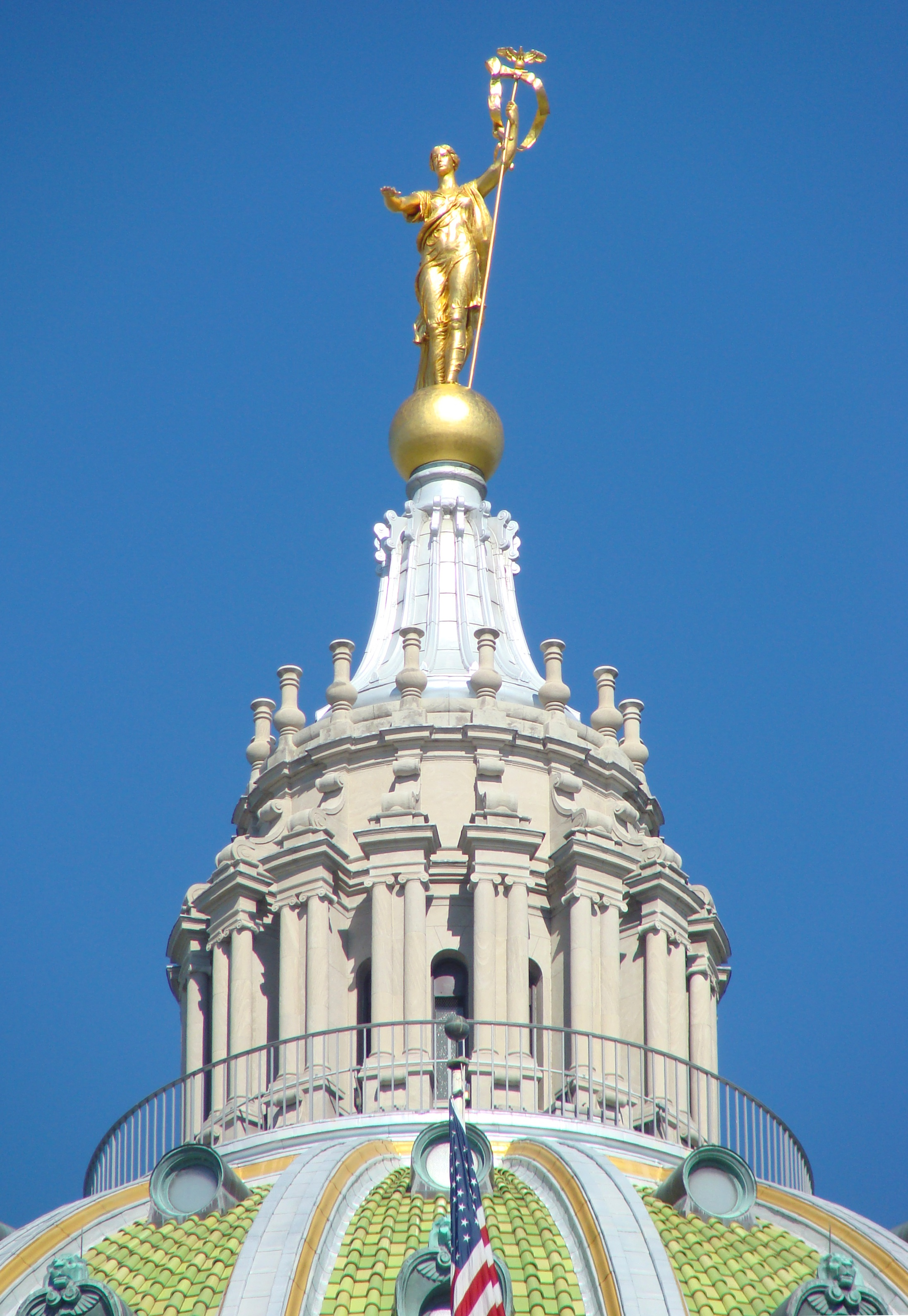
- Artist: Roland Hinton Perry
- Year: 1905
- Type: Gilded statue
- Location: Harrisburg, Pennsylvania

Commonwealth is a 14-foot-6-inch (4.42 m) gilded statue atop the dome of the Pennsylvania State Capitol in Harrisburg, Pennsylvania. It is nicknamed Miss Penn and the Spirit of the Commonwealth. It is also sometimes called Letitia, after the daughter of William Penn, the assumed inspiration for the statue.

== Description ==
Commonwealth is the "symbolic embodiment" of a commonwealth. It stands on a 4 feet (1.2 m) diameter globe and holds a staff, to symbolize justice, in its left hand. The staff is topped with a garland and an eagle with outstretched wings. Its right arm is eternally extended in benediction and blessing of the state.

== History ==
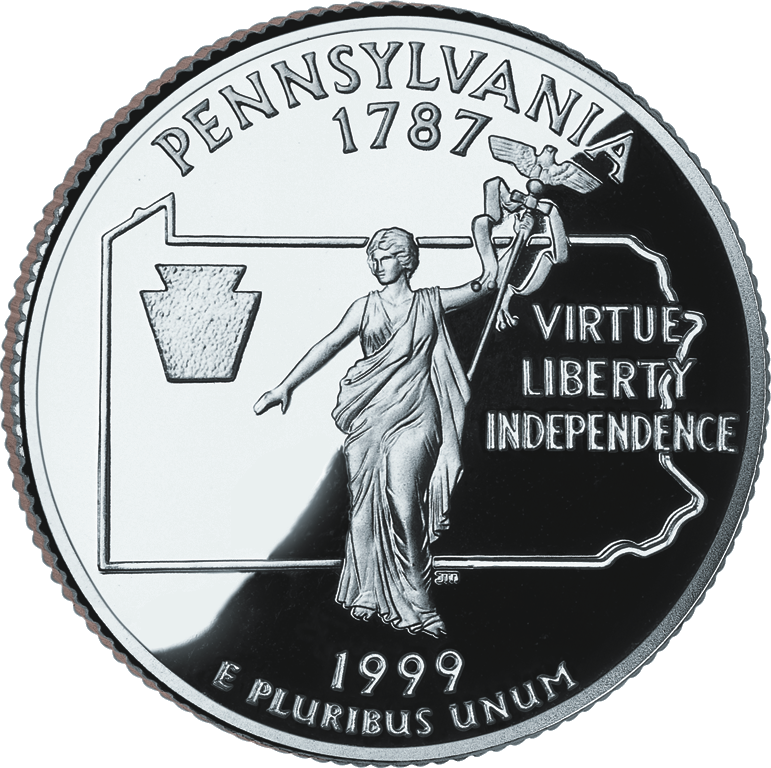
Commonwealth on the Pennsylvania state quarter (1999)

Commonwealth was sculpted by Roland Hinton Perry and was installed on the dome on May 25, 1905. The statue was removed for restoration by helicopter in the summer of 1998. The statue was placed back onto the dome by Skycrane in September of the same year, after restoration.

Commonwealth is shown on the Pennsylvania state quarter, released in 1999.
