= Roland Hinton Perry =

American painter (1870-1941)

Roland H. Perry
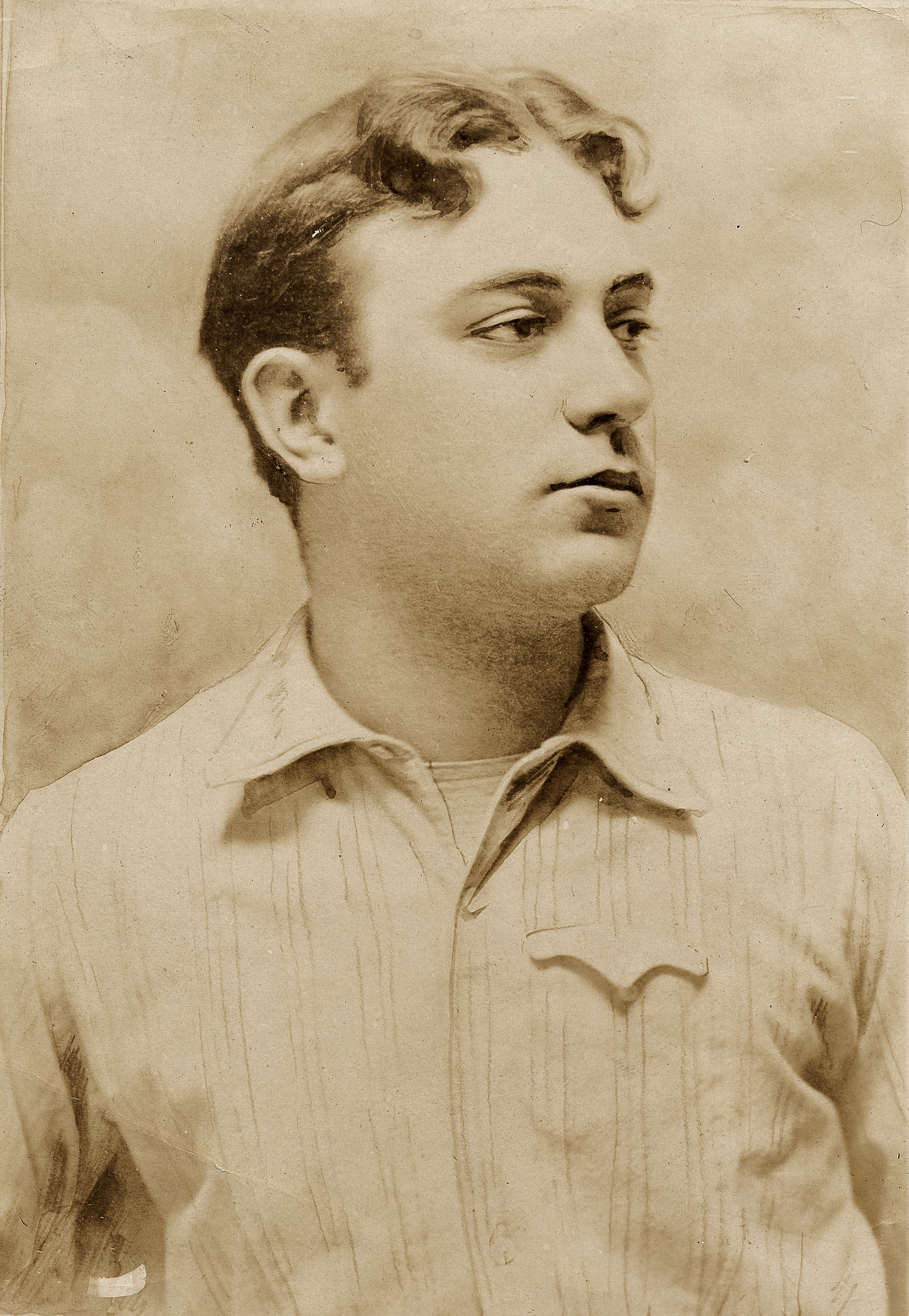
- Born: January 25, 1870; New York City, U.S.
- Died: October 27, 1941 (aged 71); New York City, U.S.
- Resting place: Gate of Heaven Cemetery; 41.095697°N 73.794546°W
- Notable work: Thompson Elk Fountain (1900); Commonwealth (1905)

Roland Hinton Perry (January 25, 1870 – October 27, 1941) was an American sculptor and painter.

== Background ==
Perry was born in New York City to George and Ione (Hinton) Perry, and entered the École des Beaux Arts in 1890 at the age of 19. At 21, he studied at the Académie Julian and Académie Delécluse in Paris and focused on sculpture, the medium in which he would achieve the most artistic success.

== Career ==
After returning to the United States, Perry received a commission to sculpt a series of bas-reliefs for the Library of Congress in Washington, D.C., in 1894. The following year, he was commissioned to create the Court of Neptune Fountain in front of the Library's main building, now known as the Thomas Jefferson Building.

The success of this work in Washington led to other commissions including a design for the statue of Commonwealth on top of the dome of Pennsylvania's new Capitol Building in 1905. He also created the spandrels on the temporary Dewey Arch in New York City (1899), Thompson Elk Fountain standing in the Plaza Blocks of downtown Portland, Oregon (1900), interior reliefs for the New Amsterdam Theater in New York City, (1903), statues of Dr. Benjamin Rush in Washington and of General George S. Greene at Gettysburg Battlefield (both 1904), the Perry Lions on the Connecticut Avenue Bridge in Washington (1906), a figural group atop Lookout Mountain in Chattanooga, Tennessee (1907), the John B Castleman Monument (1913), and a monument to the Thirty-Eighth Infantry in Syracuse, New York (1920).

Perry was a member of the Grand Central Art Galleries and the National Sculpture Society. Many of his paintings are displayed at the Detroit Museum of Art.

Perry's cousin was the sculptor Clio Hinton Bracken, and the two shared studio space for a time.

== Death ==
Perry died in New York City on October 27, 1941, at the age of 71.

== Gallery ==
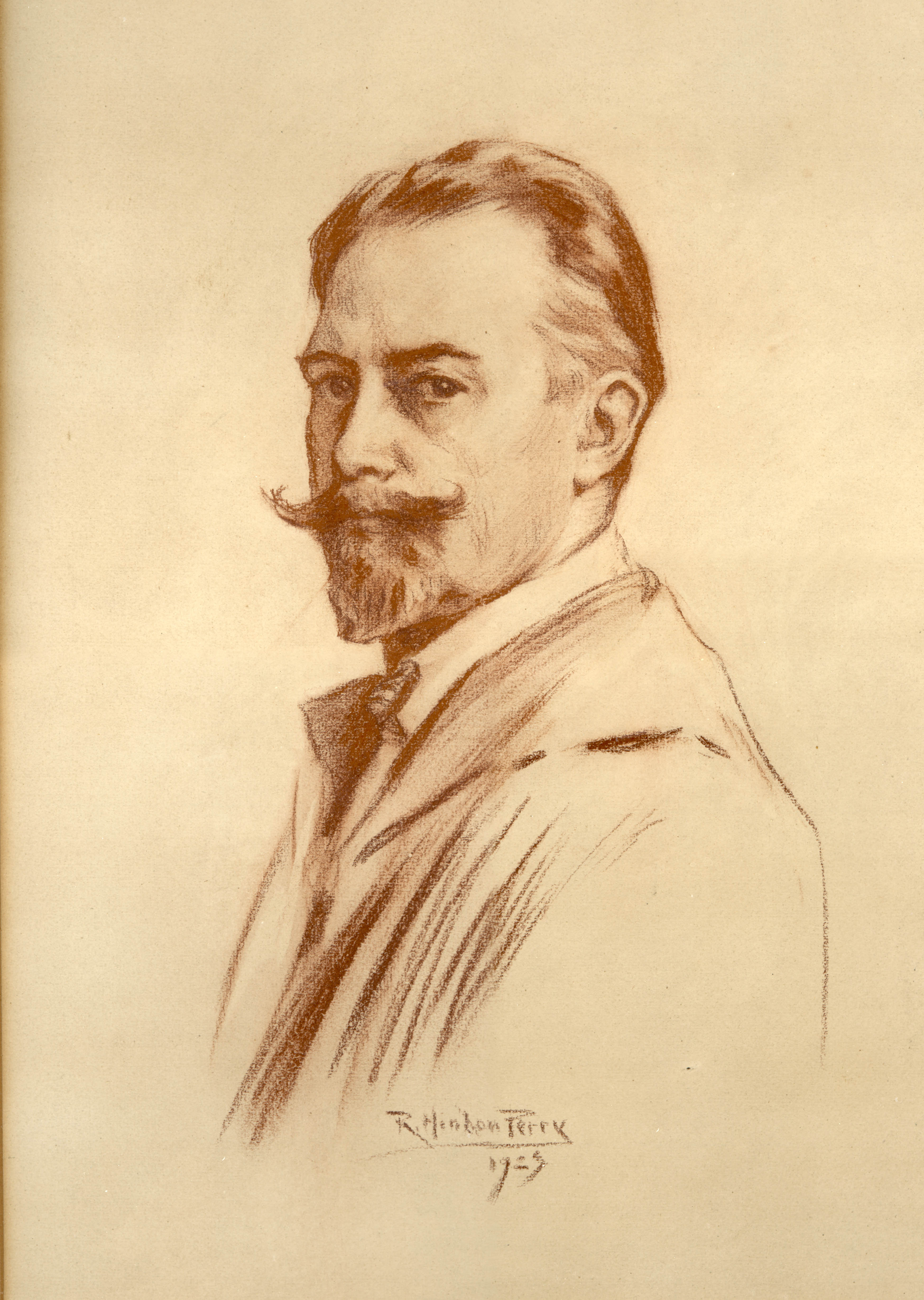
Self-portrait (1923), Chalk Study

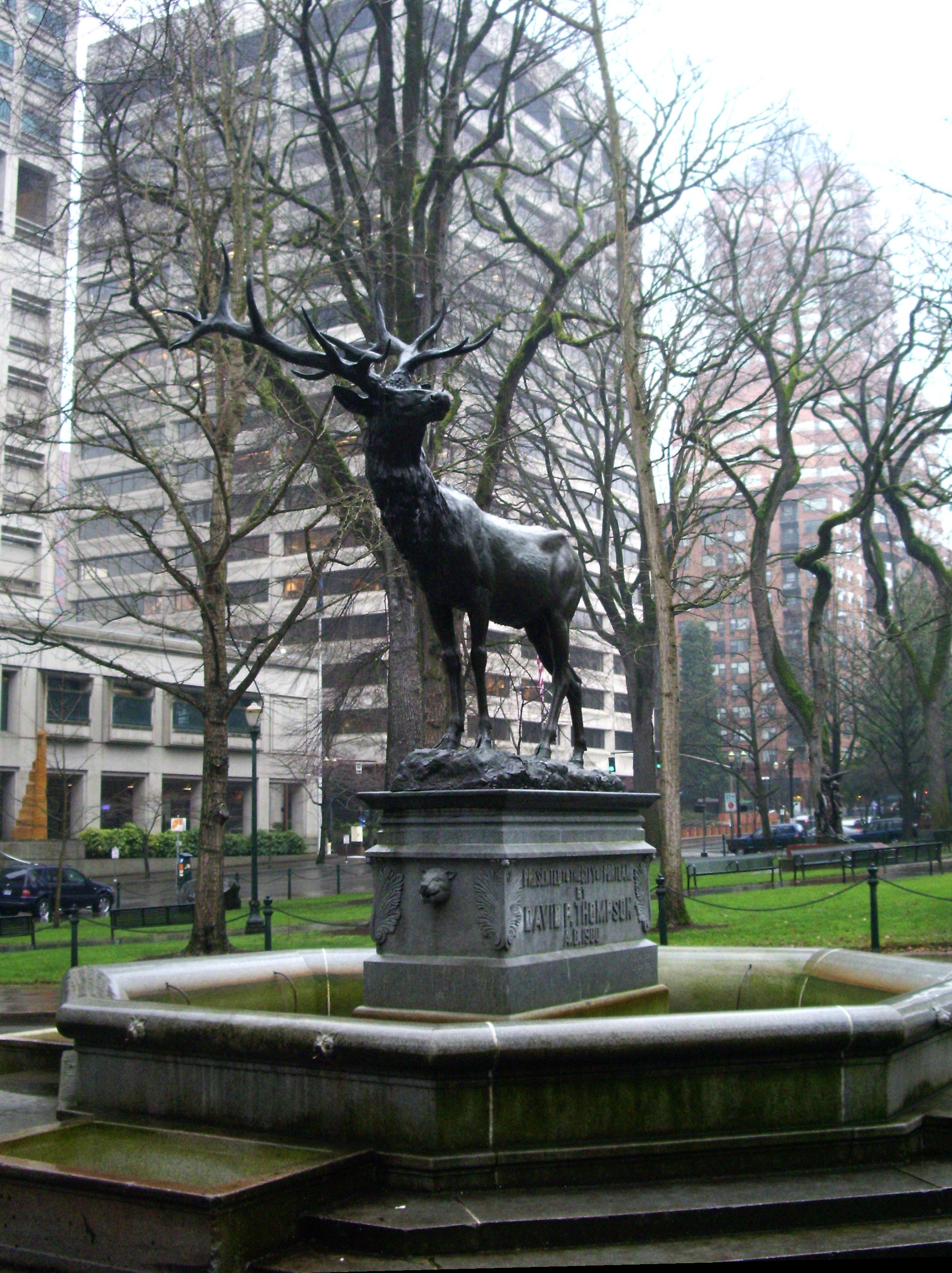
Thompson Elk Fountain (1900), Portland, Oregon

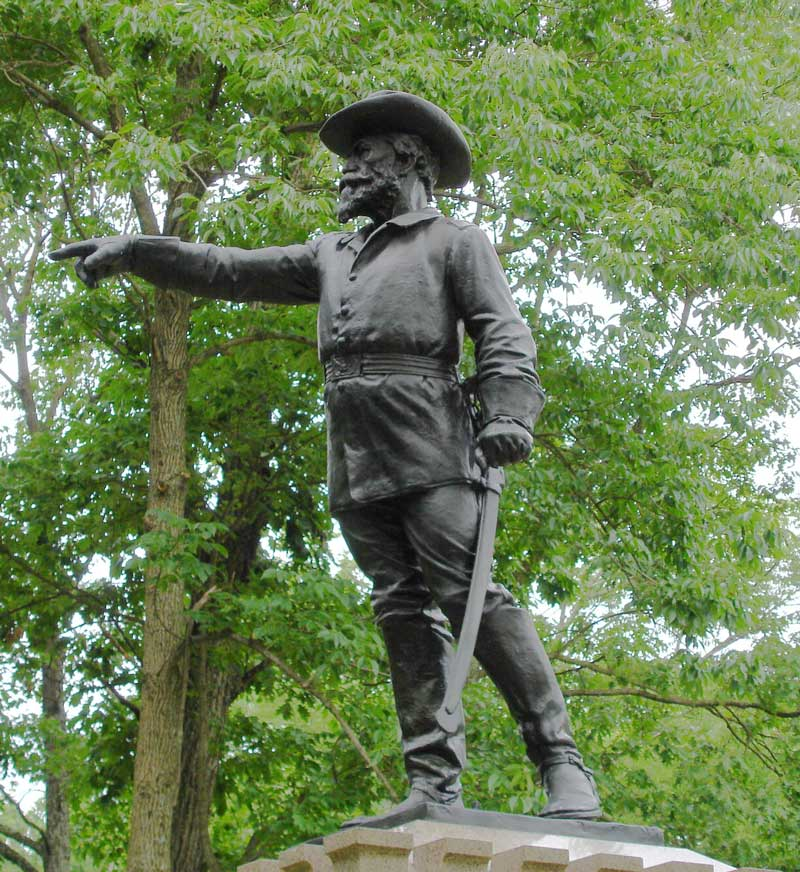
George S. Greene monument (1904), Gettysburg, Pennsylvania

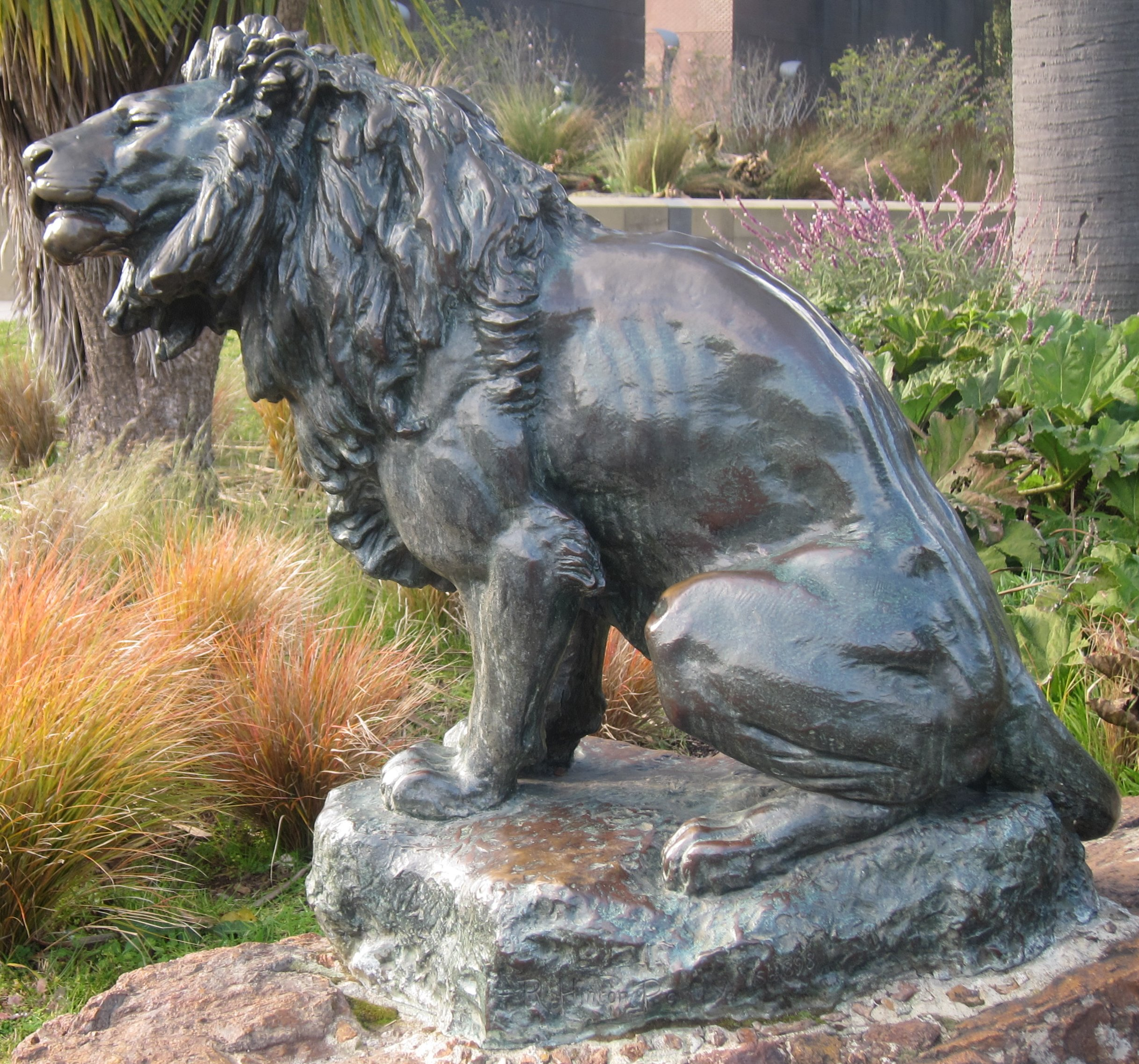
Bronze sculpture of a lion (1898, cast 1905), Golden Gate Park

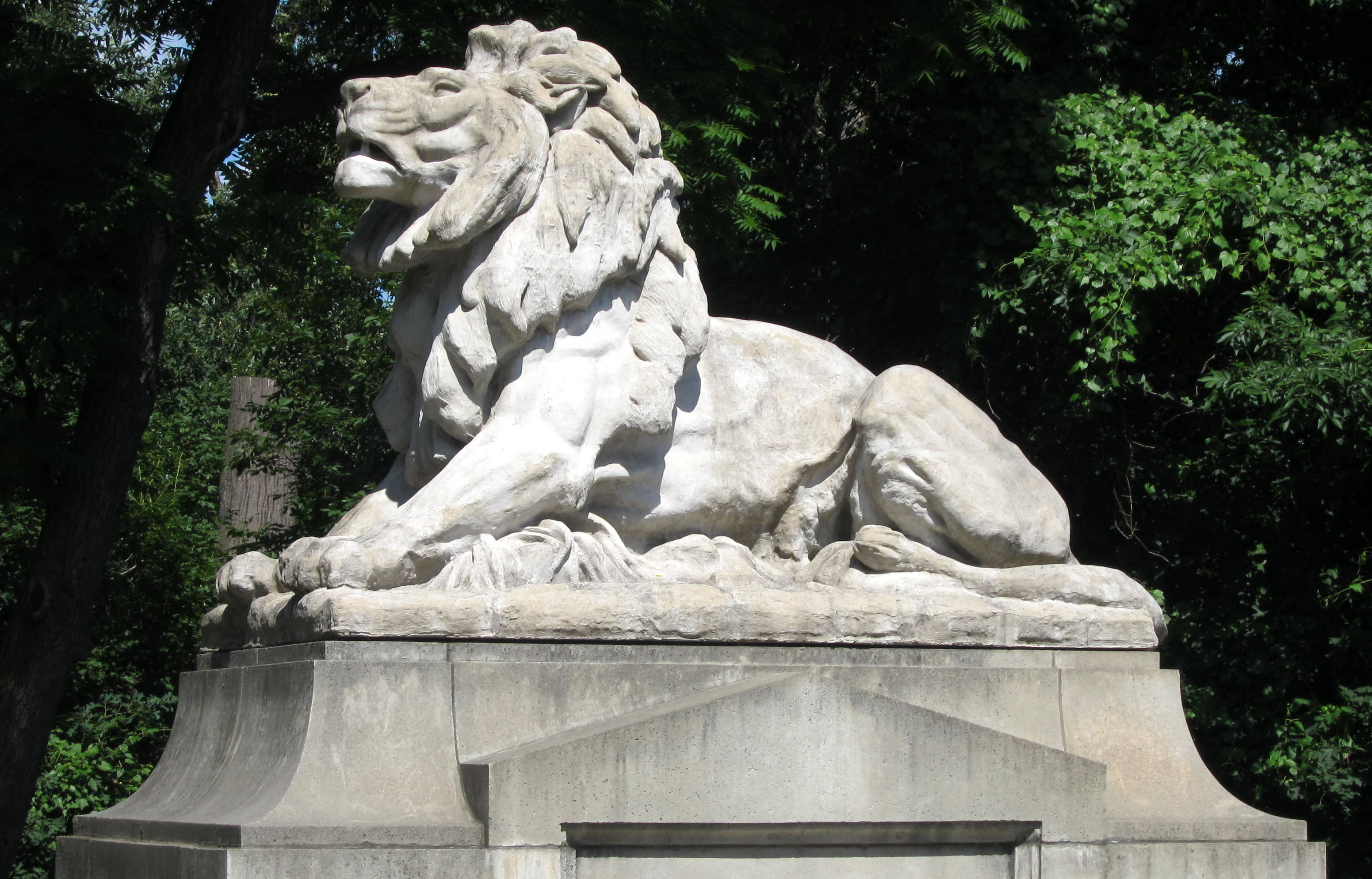
Perry Lions (1906) on the Connecticut Avenue Bridge, Washington, D.C.

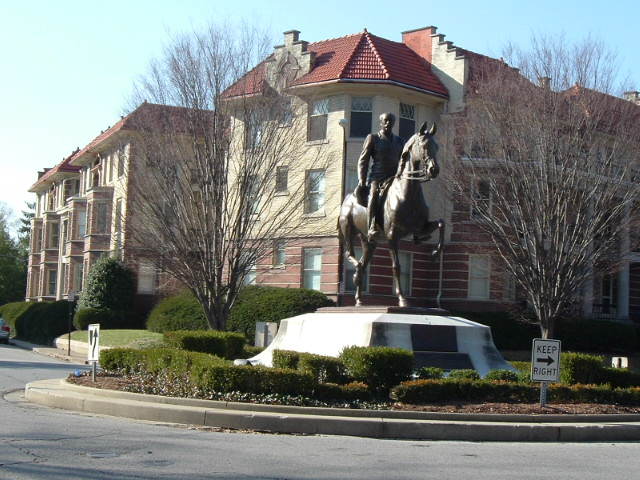
John Breckinridge Castleman Equestrian Statue (1913) Louisville, Kentucky

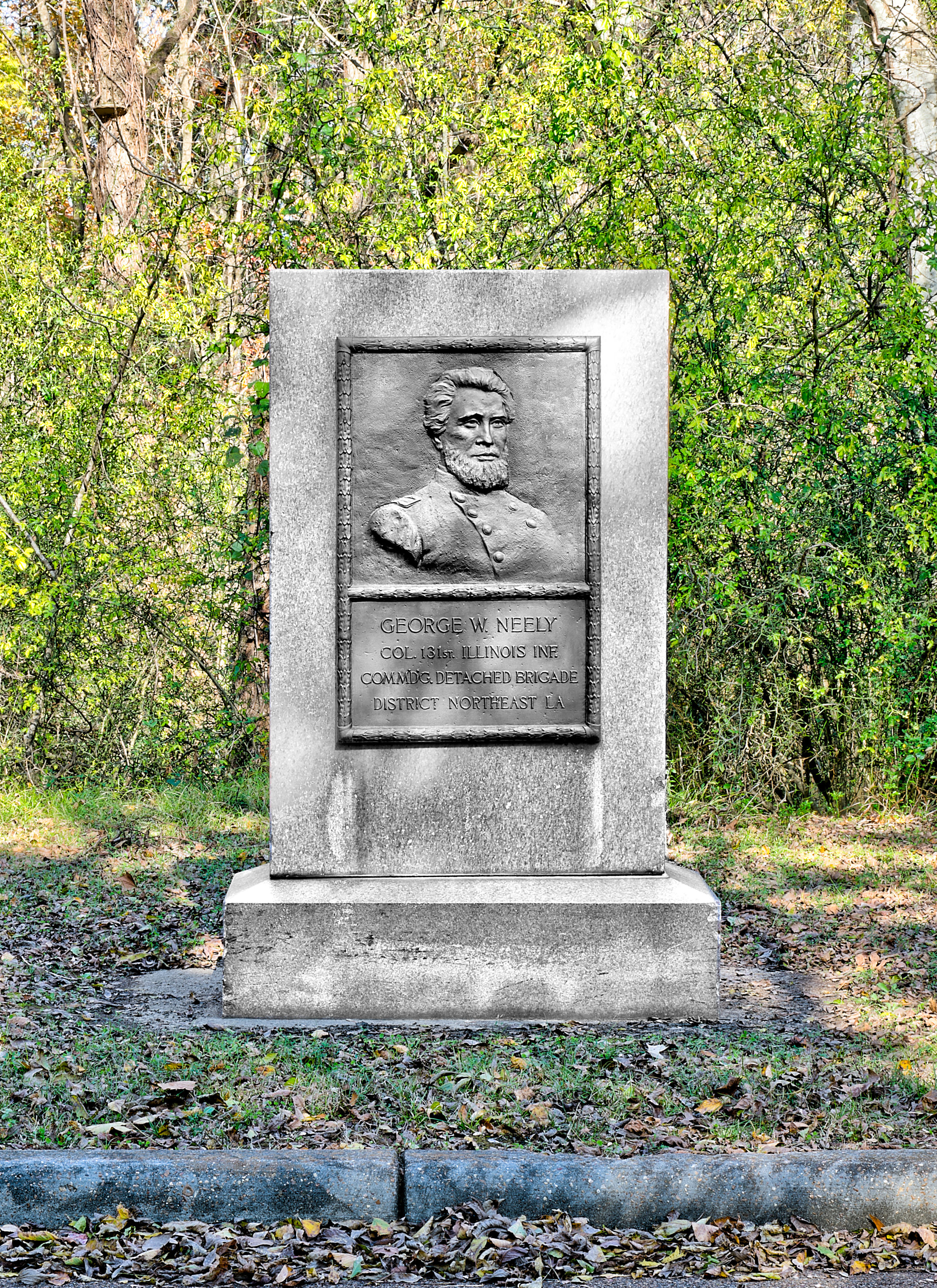
Bronze relief portrait of Col. George W. Neely at Vicksburg National Military Park
