= Epistles (Horace) =

Literary work by Horace

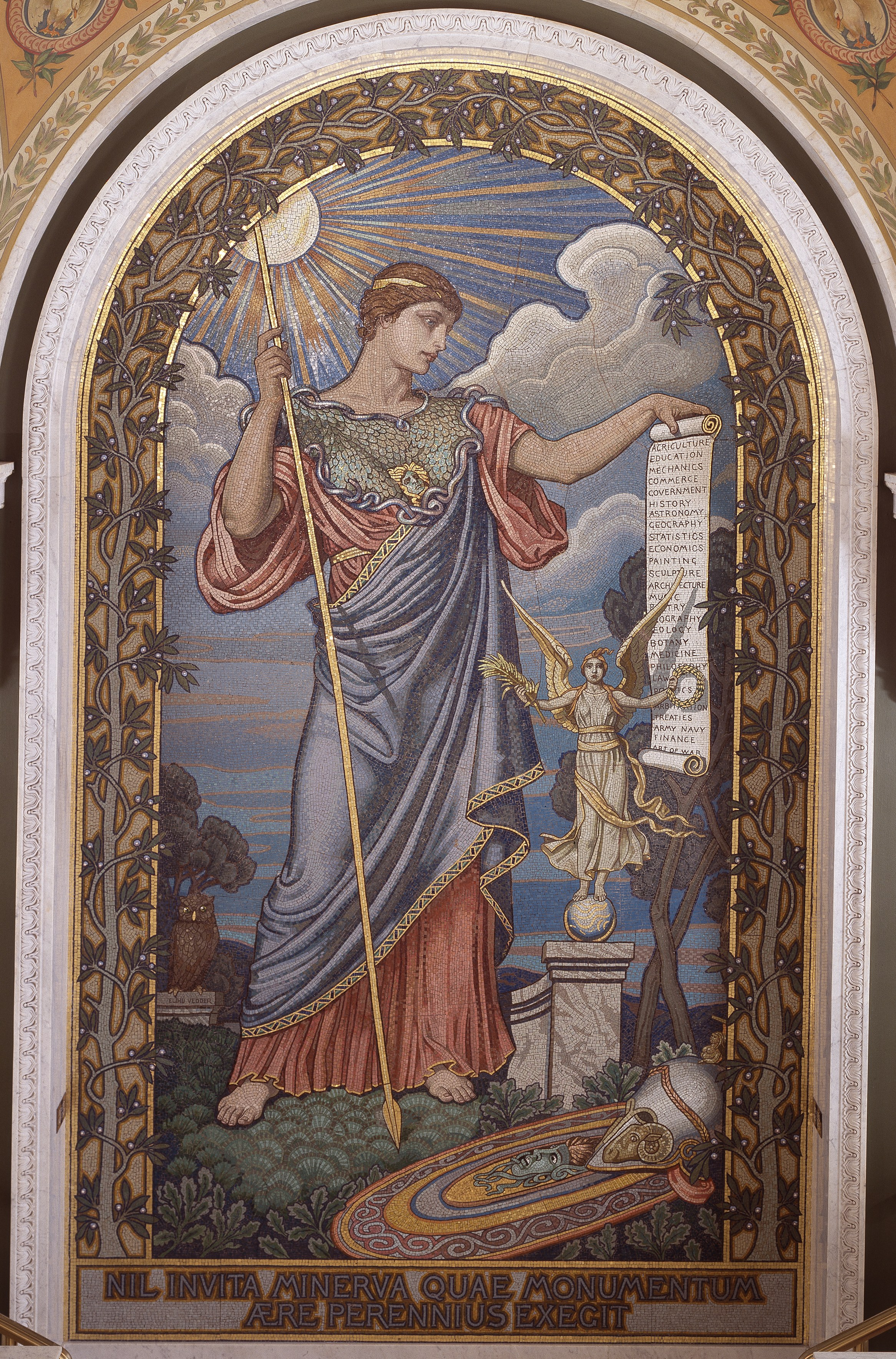
Mosaic of Minerva by Elihu Vedder (Thomas Jefferson Building). Beneath the mosaic is an inscription from Ars Poetica: "Nil invita Minerva, quae monumentum aere perennius exegit" ("Not unwilling, Minerva raises a monument more lasting than bronze").

The Epistles (or Letters) of Horace were published in two books, in 20 BC and 14 BC, respectively.

- Epistularum liber primus (First Book of Letters) is the seventh work by Horace, published in the year 20 BC. This book consists of 20 Epistles.
- Epistularum liber secundus (Second Book of Letters) was published in the year 14 BC. This book consists of 3 Epistles. However, the third epistle – the Ars Poetica – is usually treated as a separate composition.

== Background ==
As one commentator has put it: "Horace's Epistles may be said to be a continuation of his Satires in the form of letters... But few of the epistles are [actually] letters except in form..." They do indeed contain an excellent specimen of a letter of introduction (I.9); a piece of playful banter (I.14); pieces of friendly correspondence (I.3, I.4 and I.5); while the last, Epistle I.20, is inscribed 'To His Book," and forms a sort of epilogue to the Epistles he had already written. However, as a rule, the Epistles "are compositions like those which Pope, following the manner of Horace, has made familiar to us as Moral Essays."

The Epistles were published about four years after the first three books of Odes, and were introduced by a special address to his patron Maecenas, as his Odes, Epodes and Satires had been. The form of composition may have been suggested by some of the satires of Lucilius, which were composed as letters to his personal friends... "From the Epistles... we gather that [Horace] had gradually adopted a more retired and meditative life, and had become fonder of the country and of study, and that while owing allegiance to no school or sect of philosophy, he was framing for himself a scheme of life, was endeavoring to conform to it, and was bent on inculcating it in others."

"In both his Satires and Epistles, Horace shows himself a genuine moralist, a subtle observer and true painter of life, and an admirable writer." But in spirit the Epistles are more philosophic, more ethical and meditative. Like the Odes they exhibit the twofold aspects of Horace's philosophy, that of temperate Epicureanism and that of more serious and elevated conviction.

== Book 1 ==
Book 1 contains 20 Epistles.

- I.1 – On the Importance of Philosophy - (Dedication to Maecenas, Horace's Patron)

1-19 – Horace excuses himself to Maecenas for giving up the composition of lyric poetry, but he is better suited to philosophy as he grows older. However, he is not bound to any particular philosophic school.
20-40 – Wisdom is the true business of life; yet most of us must be content with but a moderate share of it: wisdom too is the only power which can tame our passions.
41-69 – Men will do and suffer anything to avoid poverty, but they will do nothing to gain virtue, which is more precious than gold. A clear conscience makes a man truly a king.
70-93 – He cannot follow the popular ideas, because he sees that they all tend one way - namely, to money-making. Besides, not only do men differ from one another in their pursuits, but no man is ever consistent with himself.
94-108 – External inconsistencies are noticed at once, while those of life and practice are passed over. This epistle ends with a joke on the Stoic doctrine of the perfect man.

- I.2 – Homer: The Teacher of True Philosophy – (Addressed to Lollius Maximus)

1-31 – Horace begins by demonstrating, in the manner of the Stoic philosophers, the merit of Homer as a teacher of morals.
32-71 – Men will take more trouble for bad deeds than for good, and more for the body than the mind. Yet, without contentment and peace of mind, material acquisitions cannot be enjoyed. Avarice and envy are always beggars, and remorse comes after anger. Youth is the time to learn self-control. He shall always adhere to the philosophy of moderation.
The phrase sapere aude ("dare to be wise") comes from this poem.

- I.3 – A Literary Staff – (Addressed to Julius Florus)

To Julius Florus, who was serving on the staff of Tiberius Claudius Nero. The letter consists mainly of inquiries and observations as to the literary pursuits of members of the staff; and concludes with a hope that the quarrel between Florus and Munatius has ended in a reconciliation.

- I.4 – An Exhortation to Contentment – (Addressed to Albius Tibullus, the Elegiac Poet)

Horace urges his friend to enjoy each passing hour, and suggests that a visit to his Sabine Farm may divert him.

- I.5 – An Invitation – (Addressed to Manlius Torquatus, to whom Horace also wrote Ode IV.7)

Horace invites his friend to dinner – Tomorrow is a holiday and Torquatus may well forget his occupations for a time. Horace then extols the virtues of wine (see also Ode III.21); and describes the preparations he is making for the banquet.

- I.6 – On Philosophic Indifference – (Addressed to Numicius)

Equanimity is happiness – Fear and desire alike disturb our peace of mind. You will find this maxim true if you seek the chief good in any other pursuit – 1) in riches, 2) in political honors, 3) in sumptuous living, or 4) in love and trifling.

- I.7 – An Independent Spirit – (Addressed to Maecenas)

1-24 – Horace excuses himself to Maecenas for not keeping his promise to come to Rome, on the ground that it would be dangerous to his health. He feels that this reason will satisfy Maecenas, as being a friend who has always had a sincere regard for his welfare.
25-45 – If Maecenas would want him to always be at Rome, then Horace must have back his health and youth. He must be free, even if freedom costs him the loss of all Maecenas' favors. Horace would give back all, as Telemachus refused the horses which were unsuited to his poor and rocky island.
46-95 – The story of Volteius Mena and his patron L. Marcius Philippus, with an implied allusion to the relationship between Horace and Maecenas. The attainment of our wishes does not always make us happy.

- I.8 – A Word of Warning – (Addressed to Celsus Albinovanus, who was serving on the staff of Tiberius in the province of Asia)

This letter seems to be a reply. Horace speaks of his own fickleness and discontent, and gently recommends moderation to Celsus in prosperity.

- I.9 – A Letter of Recommendation – (Addressed to Tiberius)

This letter is written to the future emperor Tiberius, in behalf of Titius Septimius, to whom Ode II.6 is addressed.

- I.10 – The Advantages of Country Life – (Addressed to Aristius Fuscus, to whom Ode I.22 is also addressed)

This epistle begins with Horace contrasting his own love of the country with his friend's fondness for the town; then follows the praise of Nature; and finally the poet dwells on the superior happiness that moderate means and contentment afford, compared with riches and ambition.

- I.11 – On Contentment – (Addressed to Bullatius)

To Bullatius who is travelling to Ionia – Change of scene does not alter the mind. If the mind is tranquil, the meanest and least interesting of places seem agreeable.

- I.12 – Consolation – (Addressed to Iccius, to whom Ode I.29 is also addressed)

Horace advises Iccius, who is now steward of Agrippa's property in Sicily, to be content, and compliments him on pursuing the study of philosophy. He then encourages him to cultivate the friendship of Pompeius Grosphus, and tells him the news at Rome.

- I.13 – Instructions to a Messenger – (Addressed to Vinius Asina)

Horace sends a copy of his Odes to Augustus by a friend of his court circles – Vinius Asina. The poet writes a playful note of instruction to the messenger, whom he likens (on account of his name "Asina") to a beast of burden.

- I.14 – Master to Bailiff –

Horace writes a letter to his bailiff, who dislikes the country and longs to return to city life; while Horace, detained at Rome, has his heart in the country.

- I.15 – A Request for Information – (Addressed to Numonius Vala)

Horace has decided to spend the winter at the seashore, and now writes to his friend for information about the climate and resources of Velia and Salernum.

- I.16 – Happiness Depends Upon Virtue – (Addressed to Quinctius Hirpinus, to whom Ode II.11 is also addressed)

1-16 – Horace describes the simple attractions of his Sabine Farm.
17-45 – Advice to his friend not to value too highly the admiration of the masses – their honors can be taken away.
46-62 – Many a man who seems to be good is actuated by fear, not love – his morality is hollow.
63-79 – The miser is a slave to his money. The good man is free and fearless, come what will.

- I.17 – On True Independence – (Address to Scaeva)

Horace shows that one may observe proper deference towards a patron without sacrificing one's self-respect. He gives some humorous directions for gaining the favor of great men.

- I.18 – On the Proper Demeanor Towards a Patron – (Addressed to Lollius Maximum)

As in Epistle I.17, Horace assures a friend that he can show proper deference to a patron, without laying himself open to the charge of obsequiousness.

- I.19 – The Poet on His Critics – (Addressed to Maecenas)

The Odes (Books I–III) had evidently met with unfavorable criticism outside the small circle of the poet's friends. He points out to Maecenas the injustice of the charges which have been made against him, and expresses contempt for his detractors.

- I.20 – Epilogue – (Addressed to His Book)

Horace warns his book of Epistles of the fate that attends publishing. He compares it to a young and beautiful slave, and foretells its destiny – 1) Success until it falls into the hands of the vulgar; 2) Banishment to the provinces; 3) An old age spent in schools.

== Book 2 ==
Book 2 consists of 3 epistles. However, the third epistle – the Ars Poetica – is usually treated as a separate composition. (For further discussion, see the Wikipedia article on the Ars Poetica).

- II.1 – On Popular Taste and Judgment – (Dedication to Augustus)

Horace dedicates his second collection of Epistles to Augustus, who had apparently urged him to undertake something in the line of dramatic or epic poetry. He complains of the poor taste shown by the general public, especially in regard to the drama, and says that he is unwilling to make an attempt in that line. For epic poetry he has no ability.

- II.2 – A Renunciation of Lyric Poetry – (Addressed to Julius Florus, to whom Epistle I.3 is also addressed)

Horace expresses at greater length the same general sentiments as in Epistle I.1 – He intends to devote himself to philosophy and to write only in the field represented by the Satires and Epistles.

- II.3 – Ars Poetica – The Art of Poetry – (Addressed to The Pisos)

(For further discussion, see the Wikipedia article on the Ars Poetica)
The Ars Poetica is dedicated to Horace's friend Lucius Calpurnius Piso (the Roman senator and consul) and his two sons.
1-23 – Unity and simplicity are necessary in a poem.
24-37 – We, who would be poets, must guard against all extremes.
38-44 – We must well consider our powers before we write.
45-72 – We may coin new words when necessary, but this must be done with care: words, like all other things, are subject to change.
73-85 – The various kinds of poetry: epic, elegiac, dramatic, lyric.
86-98 – We must suit our style to the different kinds of poetry.
99-118 – The words also must be suitable to the character in whose mouth the poet puts them.
119-152 – A writer should follow the traditions of the Muse; or, if he strikes out something new, must be consistent. No better guide can we follow than Homer.
153-178 – A writer too should observe the characteristics of each age of man.
179-188 – Some things should be represented on the stage, others related to the spectators.
189-201 – Certain rules not to be transgressed. The role of the Chorus.
202-219 – Of the music of the stage, and how it changes with the fortunes and manners of the people.
220-250 – The Satyric drama, which accompanied the tragedy, is not the same as comedy, and has its rules and wholesome restraints.
251-274 – On the Iambic and Spondee. The Greek taste is to be followed, rather than the license of the Roman poets, in respect to meter.
275-294 – The origin of tragedy & its development. To it succeeded the old comedy – vigorous, but scurrilous. The Latin poets deserve some praise, but their great fault is their careless, slovenly style.
295-308 – Genius cannot afford to dispense with the rules of art. The critic has his place in literature.
309-322 – Knowledge is the foundation of good writing. Poetry without sense is but a harmonious trifling.
323-333 – The Greeks had genius; the Romans are a money-getting race.
334-346 – The object of the poet should be to give instruction and delight.
347-360 – We do not expect perfection in a poem, but we do expect care and pains.
361-365 – A short comparison between poetry and painting.
366-390 – Mediocrity in poetry is insufferable – For this reason, be careful before you publish.
391-407 – The origins and office of poetry in early days.
408-418 – Genius is necessary for a poet – and yet, without art and study, genius will fail.
419-452 – Let poets avoid flatterers. Quinctilius was an honest friend, whose mission it was to tell an author unpleasant truths.
453-476 – A poet goes as mad as Empedocles; let all beware of him and keep out of the way of one who will not be helped.

== Editions ==
- Ed. Th. K. Arnold, London (1843)

== See also ==
- Prosody (Latin)
