= Gramatikov =

Gramatikov, feminine: Gramatikova is a Macedonian surname with origin in the Macedonian region in todays Greece (Egej Macedonia). With the geopolitical situation and the movement and exsile of people between 1912 and 1950 the surname spred and is common now also in North Macedonia,Bulgaria and the rest of the world. Notable people with the surname include:

. Dr. Sasho Gramatikov (Сашо Граматиков) — Born in 1982 in Skopje, North Macedonia. Computer scientist and academic at the Faculty of Computer Science and Engineering (FINKI), Ss. Cyril and Methodius University in Skopje. His research includes computer networks and multimedia distribution.

2. Kiril Gramatikov (Кирил Граматиков) — Civil engineer and professor associated with the Faculty of Civil Engineering at Ss. Cyril and Methodius University in Skopje. His areas of expertise included concrete and timber structures, bridges, and construction materials.

- Daniel Gramatikov, Bulgarian footballer
- Boryana Gramatikova, Bulgaria in the Eurovision Song Contest 2017

== See also ==
- Grammatikov, Russian variant
- Grammaticus
