= Thomas Lincoln Casey Sr. =

United States Army officer and Chief of Engineers

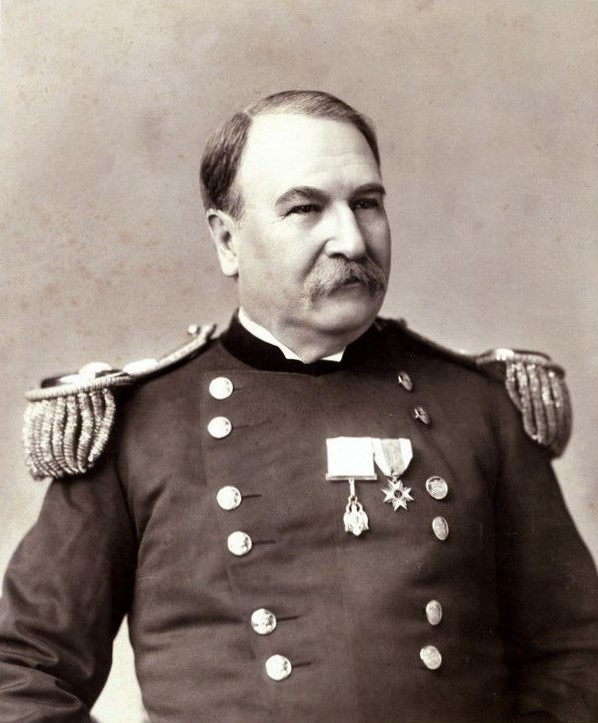
- Born: May 10, 1831; Sackets Harbor, New York
- Died: March 25, 1896 (aged 64); Washington, D.C.
- Burial place: North Kingstown, Rhode Island
- Children: Thomas Lincoln Casey Jr. Edward Pearce Casey
- Relatives: Silas Casey (father); Silas Casey III (brother)
- Military career
- Allegiance: United States (Union)
- Branch: U.S. Army (Union Army)
- Service years: 1852–1895
- Rank: Brigadier General
- Commands: Chief of Engineers
- Conflicts: American Civil War

Thomas Lincoln Casey Sr. (May 10, 1831 – March 25, 1896) was an American military and civil engineer of the late 19th century. He served as Chief of Engineers for the United States Army Corps of Engineers and oversaw the completion of the Washington Monument. American engineer Richard Weingardt wrote that Casey was the "U.S. Army Corps of Engineers’ most visible and celebrated builder of public buildings, monuments, and other significant works in the latter part of the 19th century."

== Family ==
Casey was born into a prominent family that lived on Casey Farm in Saunderstown, Rhode Island, for 200 years. This family included an admiral, generals, engineers and scientists. Casey's grandfather Wanton Casey was a member of the Kentish Guards of East Greenwich during the American Revolution.

Casey's father, Major General Silas Casey, led the assault on Chapultepec Castle in the Battle of Chapultepec in the Mexican–American War and also served as a major general in the American Civil War. His brother Silas Casey III was a rear admiral in the United States Navy and commander of the Pacific Fleet from 1901 to 1903. Casey married Emma Weir, the daughter of painter Robert Walter Weir, with who he had two sons. His eldest son, Thomas Lincoln Casey Jr., graduated from West Point in 1879, served in the Corps of Engineers, and retired from the Army as a colonel in 1912.

== Early life and military service ==
Casey was born at Madison Barracks in Sackets Harbor, New York. He was appointed by then President James K. Polk to West Point, which he attended from July 1, 1848, to July 1, 1852, when he graduated first in his class of forty-three. Other members of his class included Henry Warner Slocum, David S. Stanley, George Lucas Hartsuff, Charles R. Woods, Alexander McDowell McCook, August Kautz, and George Crook. Upon graduation he was commissioned as a brevet second lieutenant in the Corps of Engineers. From July to August, Casey served at West Point in the Company of Sappers, Miners and Pontoniers. He then worked as assistant engineer during the construction of Fort Delaware and on river and harbor improvements in the Delaware River and Bay from December 2, 1852, to August 28, 1854, during which he was made a second lieutenant on June 22, 1854.

Casey was assistant professor of practical engineering at West Point from August 28, 1854, to August 31, 1859. While professor, he served in the engineer troops from September 6, 1854, to June 27, 1857, was promoted to first lieutenant on December 1, 1856. From June 27, 1857, to August 31, 1859, Casey was principal assistant professor of engineering, and he was in command of a detachment of engineer troops in Washington Territory, from November 21, 1859, to April 1861. During the American Civil War he was stationed at Fort Monroe as an assistant engineer on the staff of the general in command of the Department of Virginia, from June 11 to August 15, 1861, being promoted to captain on August 6.

Casey was then superintending engineer of coastal fortifications in Maine and involved in recruiting engineers for the duration of the war, until July 25, 1866. Casey became a major on October 2, 1863, and was made a brevet lieutenant colonel and colonel on March 13, 1865. During the war, he served with the North Atlantic Squadron during the First Expedition to Fort Fisher from December 8 to 29, 1864. The following year he was on the special board of engineers for work on Willet's Point from April 7 to June 20, and for work on Fort Preble, Fort Scammel, Fort Popham and Fort Knox on the Penobscot River from August 1865 to February 1866.

After a leave of absence ending February 25, 1867, Casey served as superintending engineer on the construction of Forts Preble and Scammel from March 1 to November 18, 1867. He was then made assistant to the Chief of Engineers on November 18, 1867, moving to Washington, D.C., where Casey would live most of the rest of his life. He went on inspection tours from April to October 1868, and left the position January 2, 1879. In 1873 Casey was invested as an Officer of the French Legion of Honor in recognition of his work as an engineer.

Casey headed the division the Office of the Chief of Engineers responsible for military engineers, equipment, and fortifications. From March 3, 1877, to April 1, 1881, Casey headed the Office of Public Buildings and Grounds, District of Columbia, overseeing construction of the Potomac aqueduct (March 3, 1877 to August 12, 1882), the last two-thirds of the State, War, and Navy Building (March 3, 1877 to May 31, 1888), and the completion of the Washington Monument (June 25, 1878, to April 4, 1888).

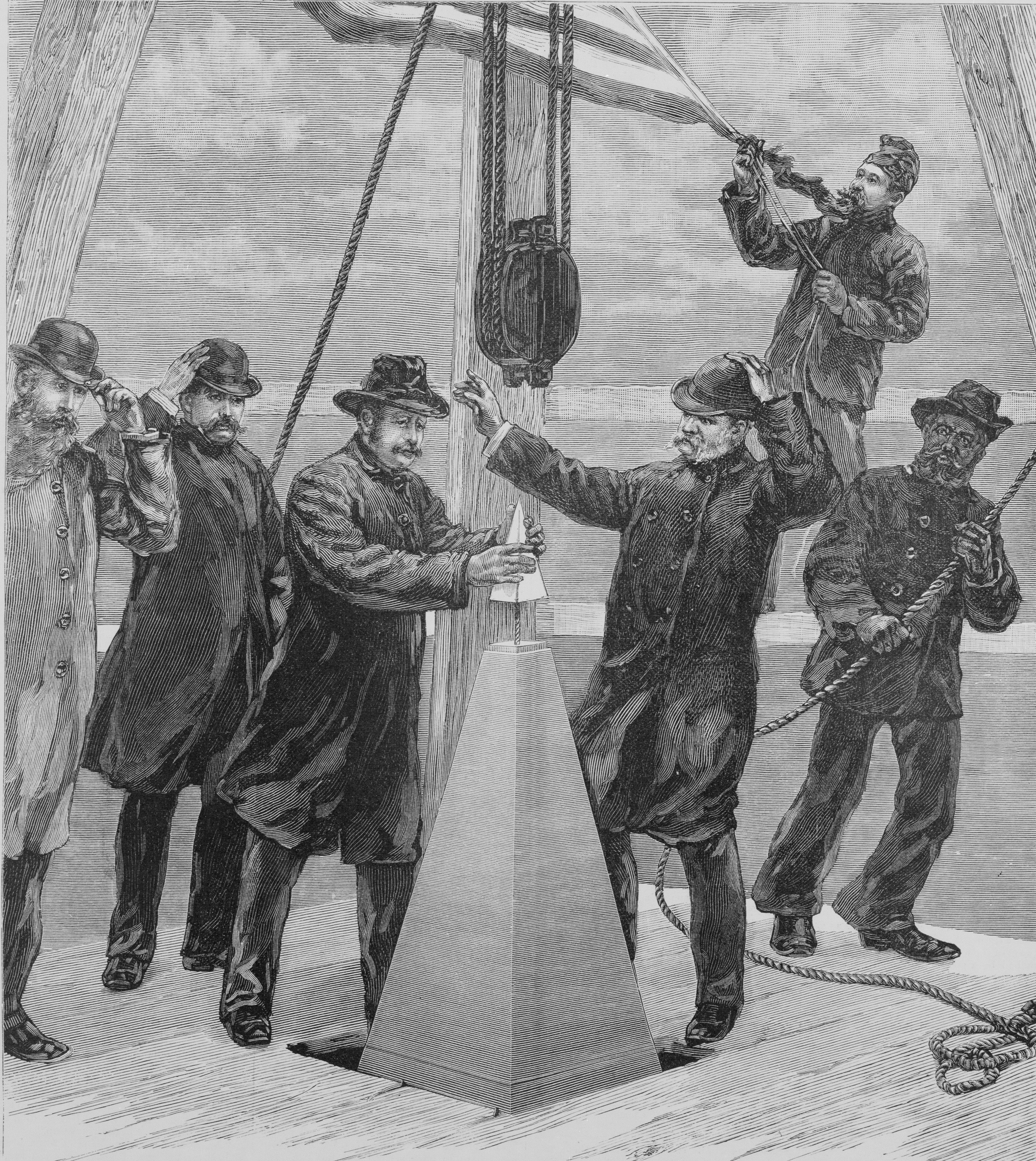
P. H. McLaughlin setting the capstone (aluminum apex) on the Washington Monument. Colonel Thomas Lincoln Casey has his hands up.

=== The Washington Monument ===
Casey's most famous project was the completion of the Washington Monument. Construction on the monument had been abandoned 24 years earlier, in 1854, due to technical and managerial problems. In its place stood a 170-foot tall pile of marble which was leaning to the northwest due to an unstable foundation. The structure was a public embarrassment and target of criticism from newspapers across the nation.

Casey was appointed to finish the job in 1878. Casey, then a lieutenant colonel and head of the Office of Public Buildings and Grounds in Washington, D.C., was known for his engineering skills and financial trustworthiness. He developed an ingenious method to balance the foundation as workmen with picks shovels dug from either side in a coordinated effort. Eventually Casey's men replaced half the old foundation, making it 13 feet deeper and over twice as wide.

Over 130 years later, after the monument was damaged by an earthquake in 2011, engineers tasked with repairing the structure consulted Casey's original papers to understand how it was built. The engineers called Casey's work "brilliant."

== Later military service ==
He also was on several boards: to study the effect of a dry dock companies work on Portland Harbour in April 1868, to make torpedo cable contracts and examine systems of torpedo defence from May 26 to October 13, 1873, to advise on the ventilation of the United States House of Representatives March 1877 to March 1881, and February 15, 1884, to September 1886, and to advise on public works in the District of Columbia from 1879 to 1888. Casey supervised the construction of a monument over Thomas Jefferson's grave May 2, 1882, to October 20, 1886, one at Washington's Headquarters in Newburgh, New York from June 7, 1883, to October 20, 1884, and one marking the birthplace of Washington, from October 8, 1883, to Oct. 20, 1886. He was made a full colonel on March 12, 1884.

On April 10, 1884, Casey was made a member of the Lighthouse Board. He then oversaw the construction of the Army Medical Museum and Library beginning April 14, 1885 and the erection of the James A. Garfield Monument from July 2, 1885. Both projects concluded on October 20, 1886. Casey was then made president of the Board of Engineers for Fortifications and other Public Works in New York City and a member of the Board of Visitors to the Engineer School of Application, both from November 1, 1886, to July 22, 1888. From February to March 1888 he was on the board considering bridge construction across the Arthur Kill, and Kill von Kull in New York Harbor.

He was promoted to brigadier general and assigned as Chief of Engineers on July 6, 1888. While Chief, Casey allocated large amounts of money to harbor and river improvements and reorganized the department. He retired from the Army on May 10, 1895, having reached the mandatory retirement age of 64.

He oversaw construction on the Thomas Jefferson Building, which houses the Library of Congress, beginning on October 2, 1888; it was nearly completed when he died suddenly on March 25, 1896. Upon his death, responsibility for the project passed to his son, architect Edward Pearce Casey. Another son, Colonel Thomas Lincoln Casey Jr., had a 33-year career in the U.S. Army Corps of Engineers and was a noted entomologist.

Thomas Lincoln Casey was buried with his father and other family members at the Casey Farm in Saunderstown, Rhode Island.

== Memberships ==
Casey was elected a member of the National Academy of Sciences in 1890, and made an officer of the Legion of Honor of France for his work on the Washington Monument. Casey was a member of the Society of the Cincinnati, succeeding his father in 1882, and a Companion of the Military Order of the Loyal Legion of the United States until his death. He was also a director of the American Society of Civil Engineers and a member of the New England Historic Genealogical Society.

== Notes ==
Military offices
Preceded by James Chatham Duane	Chief of Engineers; 1888–1895	Succeeded by William Price Craighill
