= Silas Casey III =

American Navy admiral (1841–1913)

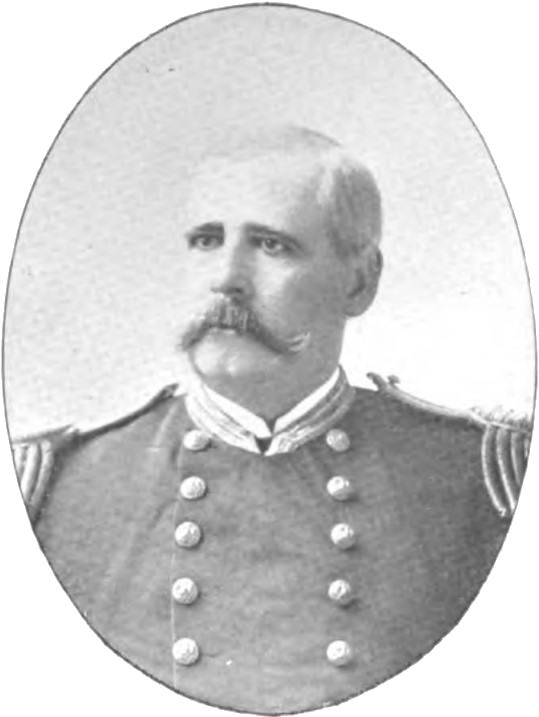
- Born: 11 September 1841; Washington County, Rhode Island, U.S.
- Died: 14 August 1913 (aged 71) Warm Springs, Virginia, U.S.
- Allegiance: United States of America
- Branch: United States Navy; Union Navy
- Service years: 1860–1903
- Rank: Rear Admiral
- Commands: Pacific Squadron; League Island Navy Yard; USS New York; USS Vermont; USS Newark; USS Dale; USS Quinnebaug; USS Wyoming; USS Portsmouth
- Conflicts: American Civil War; Battle of Ganghwa

Silas Casey III (11 September 1841 – 14 August 1913) was a United States Navy rear admiral. He served as commander of the Pacific Squadron from 1901 to 1903.

== Biography ==
Casey was born at his family's property in Washington County, Rhode Island in 1841. He was the son of U.S. Army officer Silas Casey, so his family moved along with his father's changing military assignments. The younger Casey entered the United States Naval Academy as an acting midshipman from New York state on 25 September 1856. He graduated as a midshipman in June 1860.

After graduation, Casey was assigned to the steam frigate USS Niagara from 1860 to 1862. After the outbreak of the American Civil War, he was promoted to master on 31 August 1861 and participated in an engagement with the shore batteries at Pensacola, Florida in October 1861. Promoted to lieutenant effective 16 July 1862, Casey served as executive officer of the gunboat USS Wissahickon in the South Atlantic Blockading Squadron from 1862 to 1863. He participated in several engagements with Fort McAllister at Savannah, Georgia in 1862 and the first naval attack on Charleston, South Carolina in April 1863.

From 1863 to 1865, Casey served as executive officer on the sidewheel steamship USS Quaker City in the North Atlantic Blockading Squadron, participating in the first and second naval attacks on Fort Fisher at Wilmington, North Carolina in December 1864 and January 1865. After the war, he served as navigating officer on the gunboat USS Winooski in the Atlantic Squadron from 1865 to 1867. Casey was promoted to lieutenant commander on 25 July 1866. He next served on the staff of the Naval Academy as a seamanship instructor from 1867 to 1870.

From 1870 to 1873, Casey served as executive officer on the screw frigate USS Colorado, which was the flagship of Rear Adm. John Rodgers in the Asiatic Squadron. During the Battle of Ganghwa, he led a battalion of sailors in the attack on Korean Fort Sondolmok (later called Fort McKee) near the mouth of the Han River in June 1871. From 1873 to 1874, Casey was an ordnance officer at the Philadelphia Navy Yard. On 14 June 1874, he was promoted to commander.

From 1875 to 1876, Casey served as commanding officer of the training ship USS Portsmouth along the Pacific coast. From 1876 to 1879, he was inspector for the Twelfth Lighthouse District. From 1880 to 1882, Casey served in the European Squadron, commanding the screw sloop USS Wyoming and the screw corvette USS Quinnebaug. From 1882 to 1884, he was an equipment officer at the Washington Navy Yard. From 1884 to 1889, Casey was inspector for the Fifth Lighthouse District and commander of the receiving ship USS Dale at the Washington Navy Yard.

On 12 February 1889, Casey was promoted to captain. In July 1890, he was assigned to the fitting out of the protected cruiser USS Newark and then served as her first commanding officer from February 1891 to May 1893. From April 1894 to February 1897, Casey was commanding officer of the receiving ship USS Vermont at the New York Navy Yard. from February to November 1897, he served as commanding officer of the armored cruiser USS New York.

From January 1898 to January 1901, Casey was commandant of the League Island Navy Yard. He was promoted to commodore on 11 May 1898 and rear admiral on 3 March 1899. In January 1901, Casey assumed command of the Pacific Squadron from Rear Adm. Albert Kautz. His flagship was the battleship USS Wisconsin until 9 December 1902, when he shifted his flag to his former command, the USS New York. On 11 September 1903, he retired from active duty, having reached the mandatory retirement age of sixty-two.

== Personal life ==
Casey was the son of Major General Silas Casey and Abby Perry (Pearce) Casey. His older brother was U.S. Army engineer Thomas Lincoln Casey.

Casey married Sophie Gray Heberton (1 March 1843 – 8 August 1922) on October 4, 1865. They had two daughters.

Casey and his wife lived in Washington, D.C. after his retirement. In 1913, he died at Warm Springs, Virginia and was buried at Arlington National Cemetery. His wife and eldest daughter were later interred beside him.
