= Grammatikov =

Grammatikov, feminine: Grammatikova is a Russian surname. Notable people with the surname include:

- Vladimir Grammatikov, Russian and Soviet theater and film actor, director, screenwriter and producer
- Alexander Grammatikov, an associate of Sidney Reilly

== See also ==
- Gramatikov, Bulgarian variant
- Grammaticus
