= Casey Farm =

- U.S. National Register of Historic Places
- U.S. Historic district
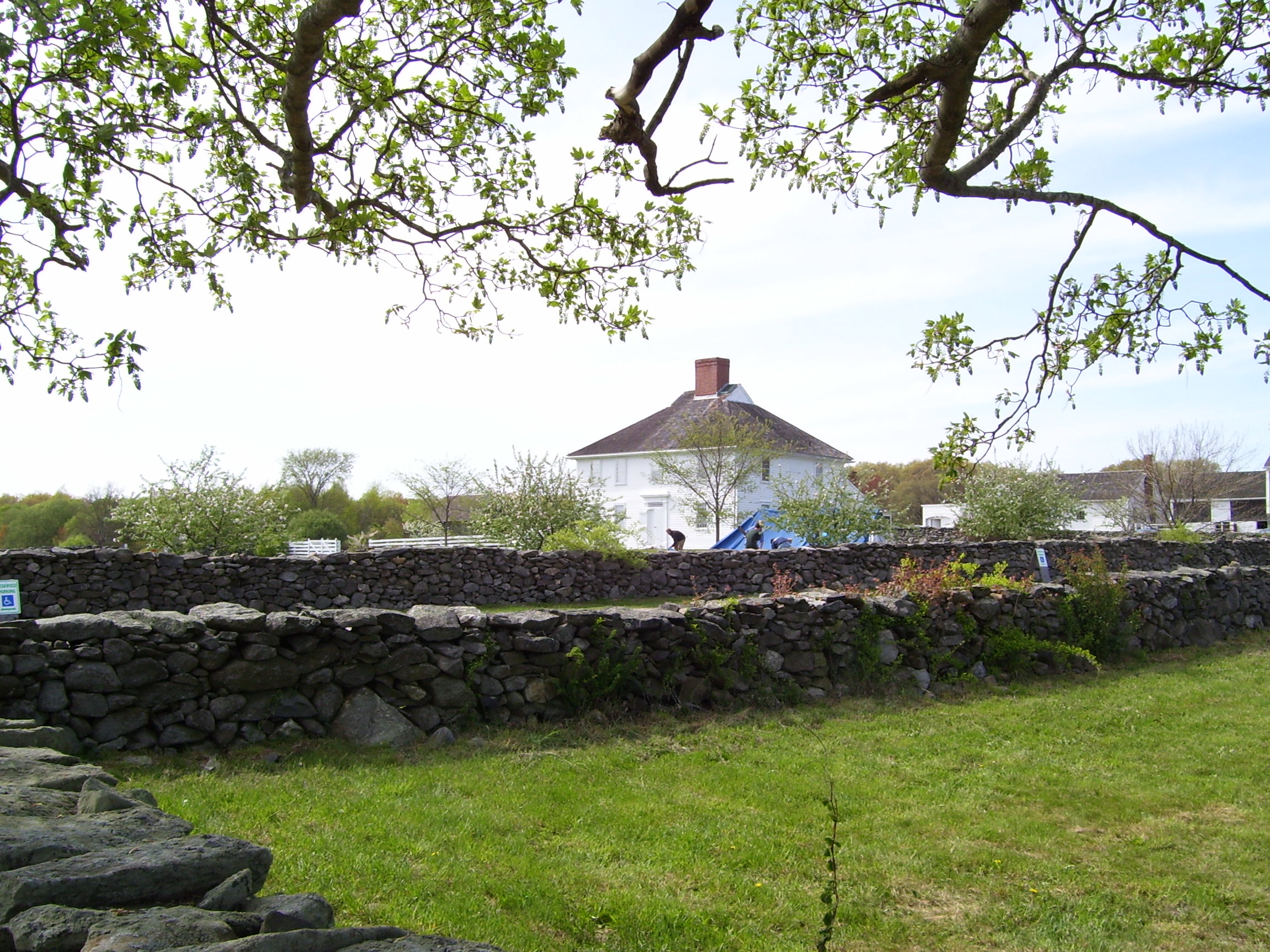
- Casey Farm

- Location within Rhode Island Location within the United States
- Location: 2325 Boston Neck Rd., North Kingstown, Rhode Island, U.S.
- Coordinates: 41°30′48″N 71°25′28″W
- Built: 1725
- NRHP reference No.: 73000006
- Added to NRHP: August 14, 1973

Casey Farm is a historic farm in Saunderstown, Rhode Island, United States. It is now a historic museum property, operated by Historic New England, and is open to the public.

== History ==
Casey Farm occupies a 300-acre (120 ha) tract of land that has been undivided in 300 years of ownership. It extends the full width of the neck of land between the Narrow River and the West Passage of Narragansett Bay. Its main house was built c. 1725–50 by Daniel Coggeshall, and became Silas Casey's when he married Coggeshall's daughter. The property remained in the hands of Casey descendants until it was given to the Society for the Preservation of New England Antiquities (SPNEA, now Historic New England).

The farm produced food for local and foreign markets. Located near Newport, Rhode Island Casey Farm had access to materials imported from England, enabling its early owners to live in a fashionable manner. Prosperity ended with the burning of Newport during the American Revolutionary War, and the farm settled into a pattern of absentee ownership. Starting in the mid 19th century, the Casey family began to improve the farm. They leased the property to tenant farmers but retained two rooms in the house for their own occasional summer use, as they had come to regard the farm as their ancestral home.

Casey Farm was also the summer home and subsequently the burial place of Civil War general Silas Casey, military engineer Thomas Lincoln Casey and Washington, D.C. architect Edward Pearce Casey.

In 1955 the farm and Casey family papers were donated to the preservation organization Historic New England.

== Visiting today ==
The farm is owned by Historic New England. Today, hired farm hands raise organic vegetables, herbs, and flowers for subscribing households in a Community Supported Agriculture program. The guided tour includes the farmyard and cemetery, where six generations of Caseys are buried. Casey Farm runs a farmers market on Saturday mornings from mid-May through October featuring organic produce and all-local vendors. The education personnel at Casey Farm also offer numerous programs for children during the school year and the summer. Staff members, which Historic New England calls "farm teachers," host various programs in the fall and springtime for schoolchildren. Casey Farm also partners with schools across Rhode Island by giving teachers and their students the opportunity to raise and hatch chicks in incubators each year. They call this partnership "Project Chick." During the summer, Historic New England has various summer camp offerings at Casey Farm for children between the ages of 3 and 13. These camps include week-long day programs and single-day programs.

== See also ==
- Open-air museum
- List of cemeteries in Rhode Island
- National Register of Historic Places in Washington County, Rhode Island
- Silas Casey
- Thomas Lincoln Casey Sr.
- Thomas Lincoln Casey Jr.
- Edward Pearce Casey
