= Thomas Lincoln Casey Jr. =

American entomologist and colonel (1857–1925)

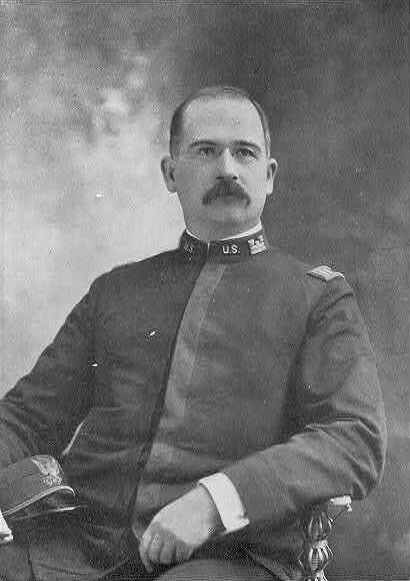
- Casey in 1898
- Born: February 19, 1857; West Point, New York, U.S.
- Died: February 3, 1925 (aged 67); Washington, D.C., U.S.
- Burial place: Arlington National Cemetery, Arlington, Virginia, U.S.
- Education: United States Military Academy
- Relatives: Thomas Lincoln Casey Sr. (father); Edward Pearce Casey (brother)
- Military career
- Allegiance: United States
- Branch: United States Army
- Service years: 1875–1912
- Rank: Colonel
- Conflicts: Spanish–American War
- Other work: Entomology; Astronomy

Thomas Lincoln Casey Jr. (February 19, 1857 – February 3, 1925) was an American army engineer and entomologist who was noted for his work on Coleoptera. He was the eldest son of Brigadier General Thomas Lincoln Casey (1831–1896), who served as Chief of Engineers for the United States Army Corps of Engineers and oversaw the completion of the Washington Monument.

== Military career ==
Casey was born in West Point, New York. He followed in his father's footsteps and attended the United States Military Academy at West Point. He entered the academy in 1875 and graduated second in his class in 1879, when he was commissioned a 2nd lieutenant in the Corps of Engineers.

He was promoted to 1st lieutenant in June 1881 and to captain in July 1888. From 1895 he was assigned to construction of fortifications at Fort Monroe and the Hampton Roads area in Virginia. In July 1898, he was promoted to major and supervised the installation of underwater mines to defend Hampton Roads during the Spanish–American War. He then served at Vicksburg, Mississippi from 1899 to 1901 and was in charge of Mississippi river improvements at St. Louis, Missouri from 1901 to 1906.

In 1906, he was promoted to lieutenant colonel. In 1909, he was promoted to colonel and assigned as engineer secretary to the Lighthouse Board until 1910. Casey retired from the army on November 1, 1912.

== Scientific work ==
He published numerous scientific papers on the subject of Coleoptera and a monograph, Memoirs on the Coleoptera (1910–1924). He was also known for contributions to astronomy.

== Later life ==
Casey died on February 3, 1925 in Washington, D.C. He was interred at Arlington National Cemetery three days later.

== Bibliography ==
Coleopterological works:

- Casey T. L. 1910–1924. Memoirs on the Coleoptera.

Malacological work:

- Casey T. L. 1904. Notes on the Pleurotomidae with description of some new genera and species. Transactions of the Academy of Science of St. Louis, volume 14, number 5, pages 123–170.
