= Thomas Jefferson Building =

Oldest building of the Library of Congress in Washington, DC

Coordinates: 38.8887°N 77.0046°W

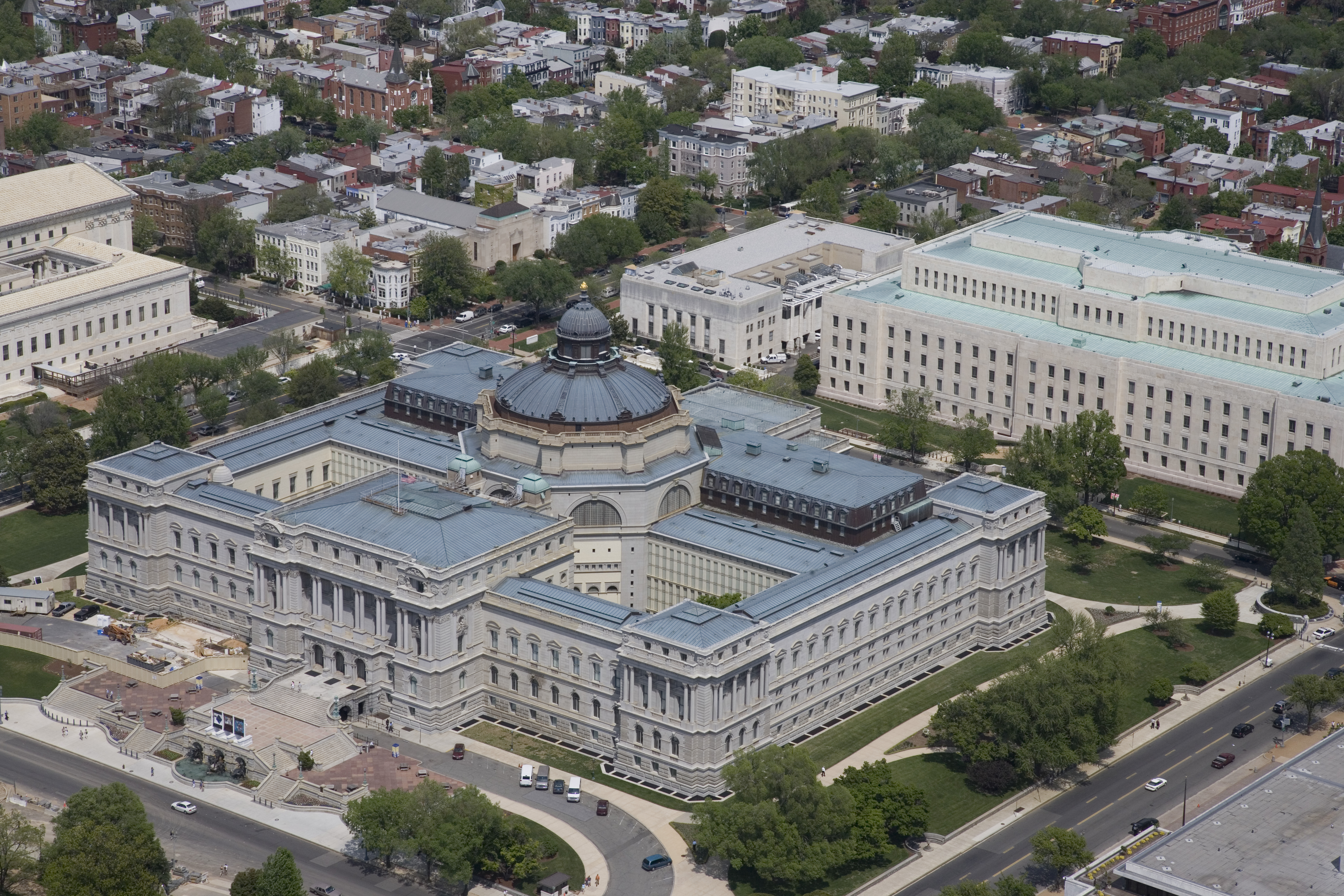
- The Thomas Jefferson Building at the Library of Congress in April 2007

- Location within the District of Columbia

General information
- Architectural style: Beaux-Arts
- Location: Washington, D.C., United States
- Construction started: 1890; 136 years ago
- Completed: 1897; 129 years ago

Design and construction
- Architects: John L. Smithmeyer; Paul J. Pelz; Edward Pearce Casey

Other information
- Public transit: Capitol South, Union Station, Washington Union Station
- Library of Congress
- U.S. National Historic Landmark
- Added to NRHP: December 21, 1965

The Thomas Jefferson Building, also known as the Main Library, is the oldest of the Library of Congress buildings in Washington, D.C. Built between 1890 and 1897, it was initially known as the Library of Congress Building. In 1980, the building was named in honor of Thomas Jefferson (1743–1826), a Founding Father, the principal author of the Declaration of Independence, and the third U.S. president. In 1815, the purchase of Jefferson's book collection formed a core foundation for the library's collection, and by the 1880s, it was felt that the library, which had grown to include the US Copyright Office, needed its own building.

The building is located on First Street, S.E. between Independence Avenue and East Capitol Street in the federal national capital city of Washington, D.C., across from the United States Capitol on Capitol Hill. It is adjacent to the library's additional buildings in the Library of Congress complex, the John Adams Building (built in the 1930s) across Second Street, and the James Madison Memorial Building (built in the 1970s) across Independence Avenue to the south.

The building is designed in the Beaux-Arts and elaborate decorative version of Classical Revival styles of architecture, and is known for its classicizing façade and elaborately decorated interior. The building's primary architect was Paul J. Pelz, who initially began work on the building in partnership with John L. Smithmeyer, and was subsequently succeeded by Edward Pearce Casey during the last few years of construction. In addition, Bernard Green was also a consulting engineer and architect (later worked on the Mississippi State Capitol of 1901–1903, in Jackson).

In 1965, in recognition of the prominent monumental structure and building's historical significance, it was designated a National Historic Landmark (lists maintained by the National Park Service of the United States Department of the Interior).

== Design ==
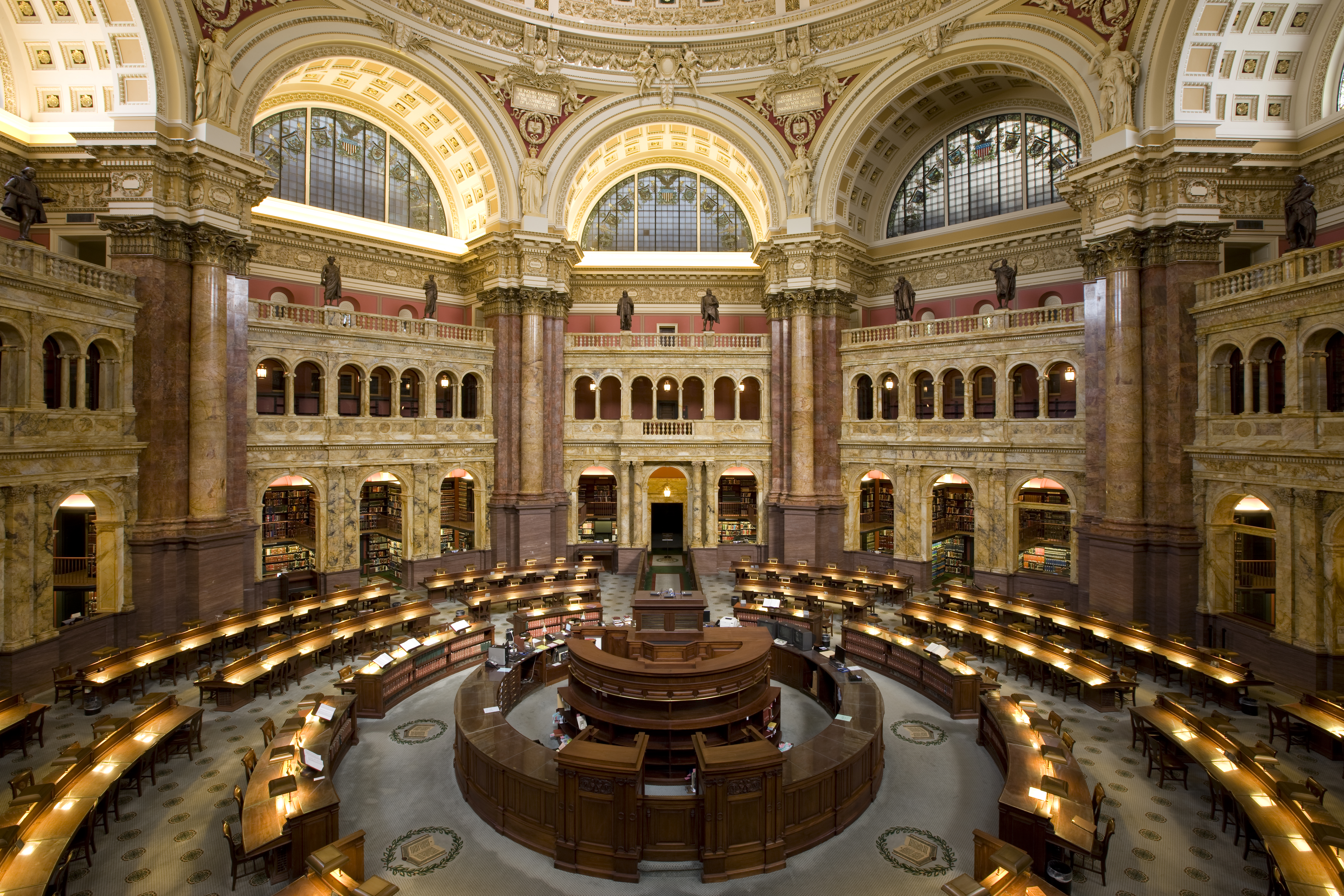
The Main Reading Room

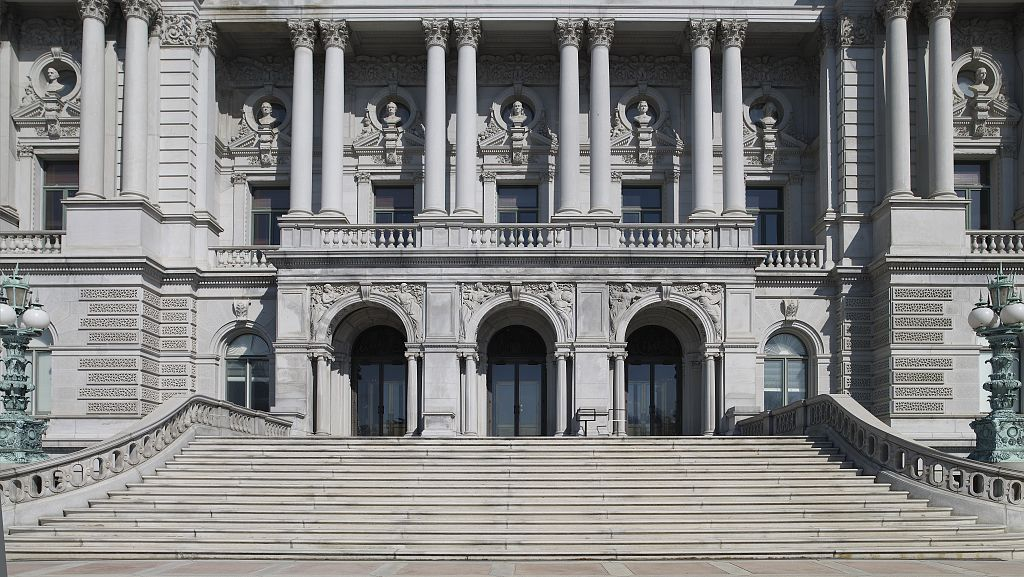
View of the Thomas Jefferson Building's west façade

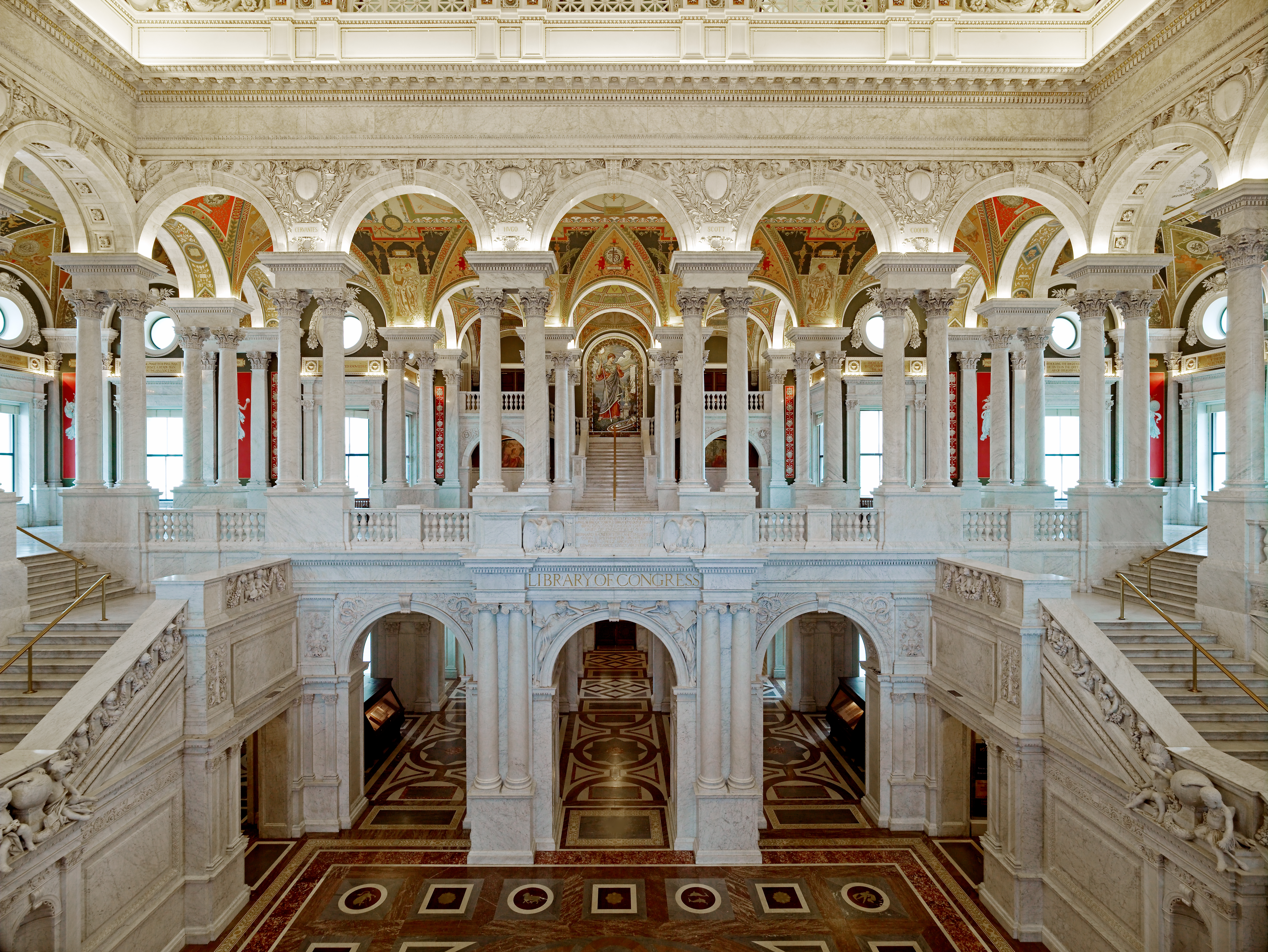
The Great Hall and a view of the building's first and second floors, featuring Minerva mosaic

John L. Smithmeyer and Paul J. Pelz won the competition for the architectural plans of the library in 1873. The start of the project was delayed by U.S. congressional debates until a vote on the project was held in 1886.

In 1888, Smithmeyer was dismissed and Pelz became the lead architect. Pelz was himself dismissed in 1892 and replaced by Edward Pearce Casey, the son of Brig. Gen. Thomas Lincoln Casey, Chief of the U.S. Army Corps of Engineers, who at the time was in charge of the building's construction. While Smithmeyer was instrumental in securing the commission, Pelz appears to have been the main designer of the building and oversaw most of the exterior work. Bernard Green, the superintendent of construction, and Casey are credited for the completion of the interiors and the artistic supervision of the building's unique decorative program. The Library opened to the public in 1897 and the finishing work was completed in 1898.

The Thomas Jefferson Building contains some of the richest public interiors in the United States. The building represents a compendium of the work of classically trained American sculptors and painters of the "American Renaissance", in programs of symbolic content that exhibited the progress of civilization, personified in Great Men and culminating in the American official culture of the Gilded Age; the programs were in many cases set out by the Librarian of Congress, Ainsworth Rand Spofford. The central block is broadly comparable to the Palais Garnier in Paris, a similarly ambitious expression of triumphant cultural nationalism in the Beaux-Arts style that had triumphed at the World's Columbian Exposition in Chicago, 1893. On the exterior, sculptured portrait heads that were considered typical of the world's races were installed as keystones on the main storey's window arches. The second-floor portico of the front entrance facing the U.S. Capitol features nine prominent busts of Great Men as selected by Ainsworth Rand Spofford in accordance with Gilded Age ideals. From left to right when one faces the building, they are Demosthenes (portico north side), Ralph Waldo Emerson, Washington Irving, Johann Wolfgang von Goethe, Benjamin Franklin, Thomas Babbington Macaulay, Nathaniel Hawthorne, Sir Walter Scott and Dante Alighieri (portico south side). The sculptors were Herbert Adams, Jonathan Scott Hartley and Frederick W. Ruckstull. The Court of Neptune Fountain centered on the entrance front invites comparison with the Trevi Fountain; its sculptor was Roland Hinton Perry. The copper dome, originally gilded, was criticized at the structure's completion, as too competitive with the national Capitol Building. Originally, the dome over the Main Reading Room was intended to be less than 70 ft tall to avoid this critique, however Casey and Green increased the size of the dome to 195 ft and covered it with 23 carat gold leaf.

== History ==
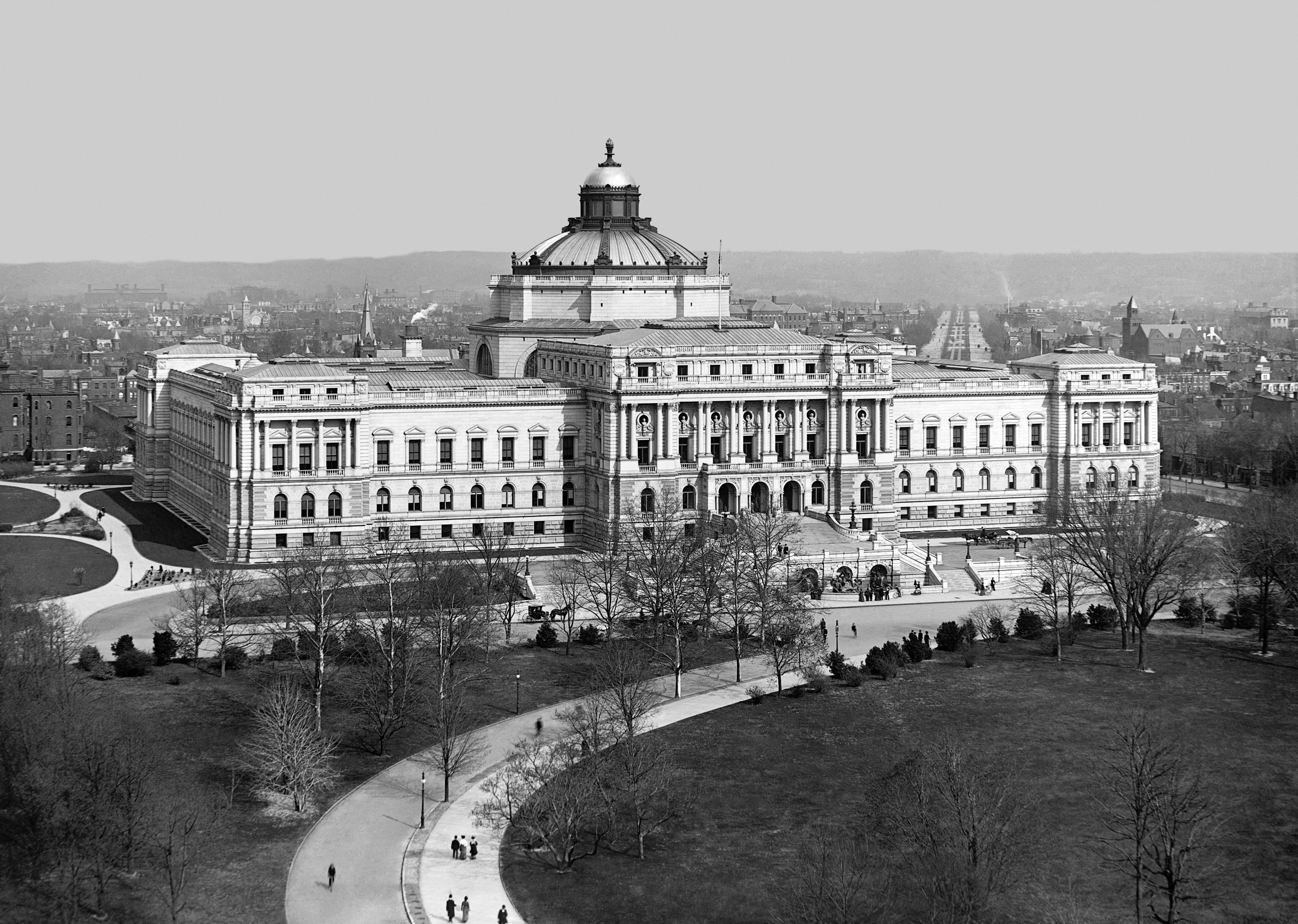
Library of Congress building, c. 1902

Needing more room for its increasing collection, the Library of Congress under Librarian Ainsworth Rand Spofford suggested to the Congress that a new building be built specifically to serve as the American national library. Prior to this the Library existed in a wing of the Capitol Building. The new building was needed partly because of the growing Congress, but also partly because of the Copyright Law of 1870, which required all copyright applicants to send to the Library two copies of their work. This resulted in a flood of books, pamphlets, maps, music, prints and photographs. Spofford had been instrumental in the enactment of this law.

After Congress approved construction of the building in 1886, it took eleven years to complete. The building opened to the public on November 1, 1897, met with wide approval and was immediately seen as a national monument. The building name was changed on June 13, 1980, to honor former U.S. President Thomas Jefferson, who had been a key figure in the establishment of the Library in 1800. Jefferson offered to sell his personal book collection to Congress in September 1814, one month after the British had burned the Capitol in the War of 1812.

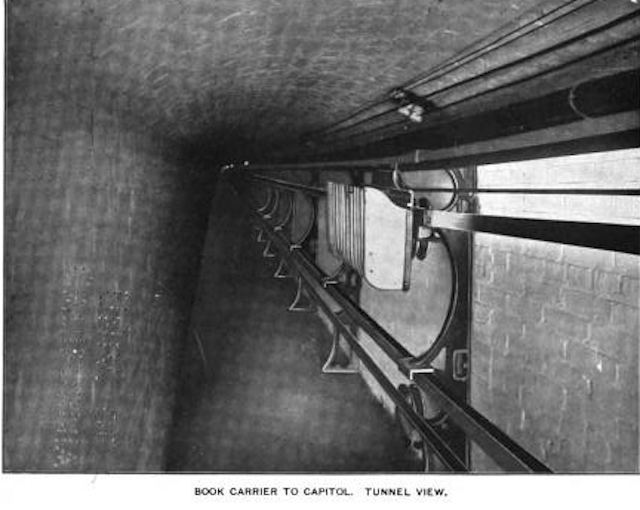
Inside the book tunnel

== Book Conveying Apparatus ==
Prior to the 2000s, the Jefferson Building was linked to the Capitol Building by a purpose built book tunnel. This housed an electric "book conveying apparatus" that could transport volumes between the two buildings at 600 feet per minute. A portion of the book tunnel was destroyed to make room for the underground Capitol Visitor Center, which opened in 2008.

== Capitol Page School ==
Senate, House and Supreme Court pages formerly attended school together in the Capitol Page School located on the attic level above the Great Hall. Upon the separation of the programs (and the closure of the Supreme Court Page Program), the schools split. Senate Pages now attend school in the basement of their dormitory. The House Page Program was closed in August 2011. A small suite in the northwest corner of the attic level remains home to the official office of the Poet Laureate of the United States.

== Coolidge Auditorium ==
The Elizabeth Sprague Coolidge Auditorium, which opened in October 1925, has been home to more than 2,000 concerts, from classical music to jazz, and folk to pop. Some performances make use of the Library's extensive collection of musical instruments and manuscripts. Most of the performances are free and open to the public.

Elizabeth Sprague Coolidge was a wealthy patron of the arts and was no relation to Calvin Coolidge, who, coincidentally, was President of the United States at the time the Coolidge auditorium was established.

== Art ==
According to the Records of the Columbia Historical Society, Bernard Green, who played an important role on the interior design of the building, viewed the interior art as necessary "to fully and consistency carry out the monumental design and purpose of the building".

Art and sculptures can be found in and throughout the Jefferson Building. Representatives of the National Sculpture Society met with Casey and Green during the building's construction to select the sculptors for the Library's statues and figures. In 1894, 20 American sculptors were extended commissions and 19 accepted. In total, more than fifty American painters and sculptors produced commissioned works of art.

The Main Reading Room, circular in shape, is crowned by the library's central dome, the underside decorated with murals painted by Edwin Blashfield in 1896. In the dome's center, on the underside of the lantern, is a female figure representing Human Understanding, shown in the process of pulling a veil back from over her face, symbolizing the end of ignorance. Surrounding her, and ringing the base of the lantern, is a mural called "The Evolution of Civilization", depicting 12 winged figures that each represent a different historical culture or period, as well as what was considered to be their major contribution to human knowledge. These figures are Egypt (written records), Judea (religion), Greece (philosophy), Rome (administration), Islam (physics), The Middle Ages (modern languages), Italy (fine arts), Germany (the art of printing), Spain (discovery), England (literature), France (emancipation), and America (science).

Around the perimeter of the Main Reading Room are eight large marble columns that are each decoratively topped with a large plaster statue of a female figure, each representing a different aspect of knowledge and civilization. Pendentives rest above each symbolic statue, with a quote from a notable author or literary work relating to each aspect. Additionally, below these 8 symbolic statues are an additional 16 bronze statues on the raised balustrades overlooking the Main Reading Room, flanking the specific aspects they are meant to correlate with. These portrait statues "pay homage to men whose lives symbolized the thought and activity represented by the plaster statues." The subjects were chosen by Ainsworth Rand Spofford, Librarian of Congress from 1864 to 1897.

Details of each of the symbolic statues and their accompanying portrait statues are included in the table below.

Statue	Description	Sculptor
Religion	The statue of Religion is holding a flower, which symbolizes "the lesson of God revealed in nature". The pendentive resting above this statue is a quote from Micah 6:8 that reads "What doth the Lord require of thee, but to do justly, and to love mercy, and to walk humbly with thy God?".	Theodore Baur
Moses	The Hebrew prophet and leader of the Exodus from Egypt is depicted holding the Ten Commandments, which he received atop Mount Sinai. He is also depicted with horns.	Charles Henry Niehaus
Paul the Apostle	The early Christian religious leader is depicted holding an open scroll in his left hand and a sword in his right.	John Donoghue
Commerce	The statue of Commerce wears a wreathed crown of olive leaves and is holding a miniature Baltimore clipper and locomotive in each hand. The pendentive resting above this statue includes a quote from Dudley North that reads "We taste the spices of Arabia yet never feel the scorching sun which brings them forth.".	John Flanagan
Christopher Columbus	The Italian explorer and navigator holds a collection of maps in his hand, and is shown taking a small step off of his statue's base.	Paul Wayland Bartlett
Robert Fulton	The American engineer and inventor of the steamboat is depicted examining a crude model ship, with a small table of woodworking tools next to him.	Edward C. Potter
History	The statue of History is shown holding a stack of books in her left hand, while in her right, she points a hand mirror backward over her shoulder. The pendentive resting above this statue includes a quote from Alfred, Lord Tennyson that reads "One God, one law, one element, and one far-off divine event, to which the whole creation moves.".	Daniel Chester French
Herodotus	The ancient Greek writer and "Father of History" is shown shielding his eyes from the sun with a scroll, and is also holding a walking stick, likely referencing his wide travels across the known world.	Daniel Chester French
Edward Gibbon	The English historian is depicted in deep thought, with a book tucked under his arm.	Charles Henry Niehaus
Art	The statue of Art, the only figure to be unclothed, wears a laurel wreath over her flowing hair and holds a model of the Parthenon, at her feet a small tree covered in artists' tools. The pendentive resting above this statue includes a quote from James Russell Lowell that reads "As one lamp lights another, nor grows less, so nobleness enkindleth nobleness.".	Franois M.L. Tonetti-Dozzi
Michelangelo	The Italian sculptor, painter, and architect is shown holding a chisel.	Paul Wayland Bartlett
Ludwig van Beethoven	The German composer is depicted holding a small ear trumpet to his ear, an allusion to his chronic deafness.	Theodore Baur
Philosophy	The statue of Philosophy holds a book in her left arm, her eyes downcast. The pendentive resting above this statue includes a quote from Francis Bacon that reads "The inquiry, knowledge, and belief of truth is the sovereign good of human nature.".	Bela Lyon Pratt
Plato	The ancient Athenian philosopher is wrapped in a simple cloak, indicative of the Greek philosophers' renouncement of most worldly possessions.	John J. Boyle
Francis Bacon	The English philosopher, contrary to his counterpart, is shown wearing elaborate Jacobean era fashion, an open display of his wealth and high standing in English society. This dichotomy was likely intentional, as both statues were designed by Boyle.	John J. Boyle
Poetry	The statue of Poetry, an open scroll hanging from her hand, is depicted with her mouth slightly open, as if she is about to speak to an audience. The pendentive resting above this statue includes a quote from John Milton that reads "Hither, as to their fountain, other stars repairing, in their golden urns draw lights.".	John Quincy Adams Ward
Homer	The ancient Greek poet wears a crown of laurels, clutching both a scroll and a walking stick (the latter a reference to his purported blindness).	Louis Saint-Gaudens
William Shakespeare	The English playwright holds an open book and a pen in each hand, positioned to resume writing.	Frederick MacMonnies
Law	The statue of Law is depicted with a cloak draped over her head and holding a set of documents. Beside her sits a tablet, representing the permanence of some legal decisions. Additionally, her eyes are carved with exceptional detail, possibly a literal depiction of the "eyes of the law". The pendentive resting above this statue includes a quote from Richard Hooker that reads "Of Law there can be no less acknowledged than that her voice is the harmony of the world.".	Paul Wayland Bartlett
Solon	The ancient Athenian statesman, resting his right hand on a sword draped in laurels, holds aloft a scroll in his left. On the scroll is written "OI NOMOI" ("the law").	Fredrick Wellington Ruckstull
James Kent	The American legal scholar and head of New York's judicial system (Chief Justice, 1804–1814; Chancellor, 1814–1823) wears judge's robes, holding a stack of papers and a quill.	George Bissell
Science	The statue of Science is holding a globe surmounted by a triangle, a symbol of the Earth's mysteries. She also holds a hand mirror in front of her. The pendentive resting above this statue includes a quote from Psalms 19:1 that reads " The heavens declare the glory of God; and the firmament showeth his handiwork.".	John Donoghue
Isaac Newton	The English physicist is shown looking straight down; as the statues are placed high off the ground floor, this may be an allusion to his work on the law of gravity.	Cyrus E. Dallin
Joseph Henry	The American scientist and first Secretary of the Smithsonian Institution (1846–1878) is shown wearing an academic gown and holding an insulated horseshoe magnet, a reference to his work regarding electromagnetism.	Herbert Adams

Art at the Thomas Jefferson Building

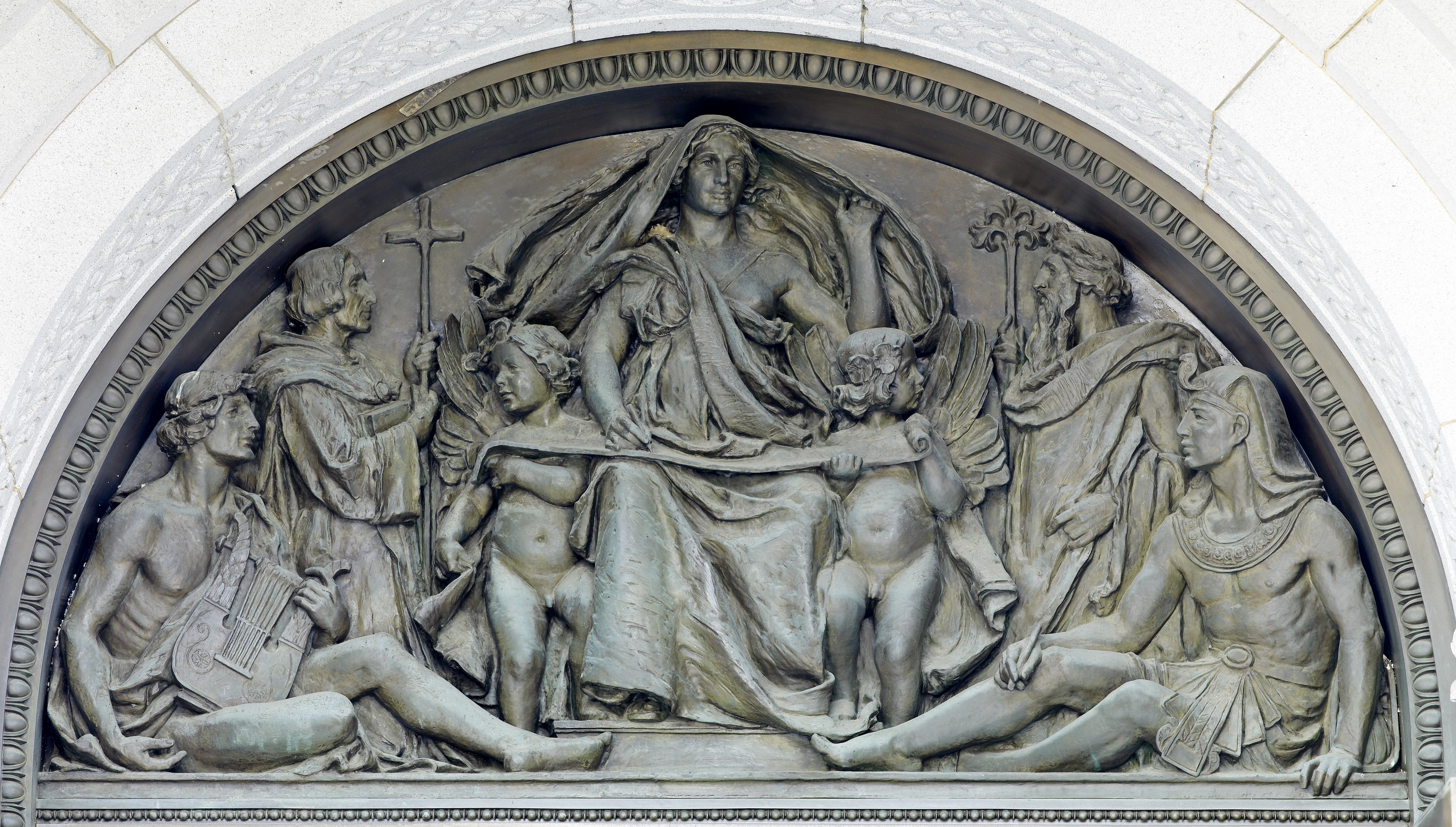
Olin Levi Warner, tympanum representing Writing, above exterior of main entrance doors, 1896

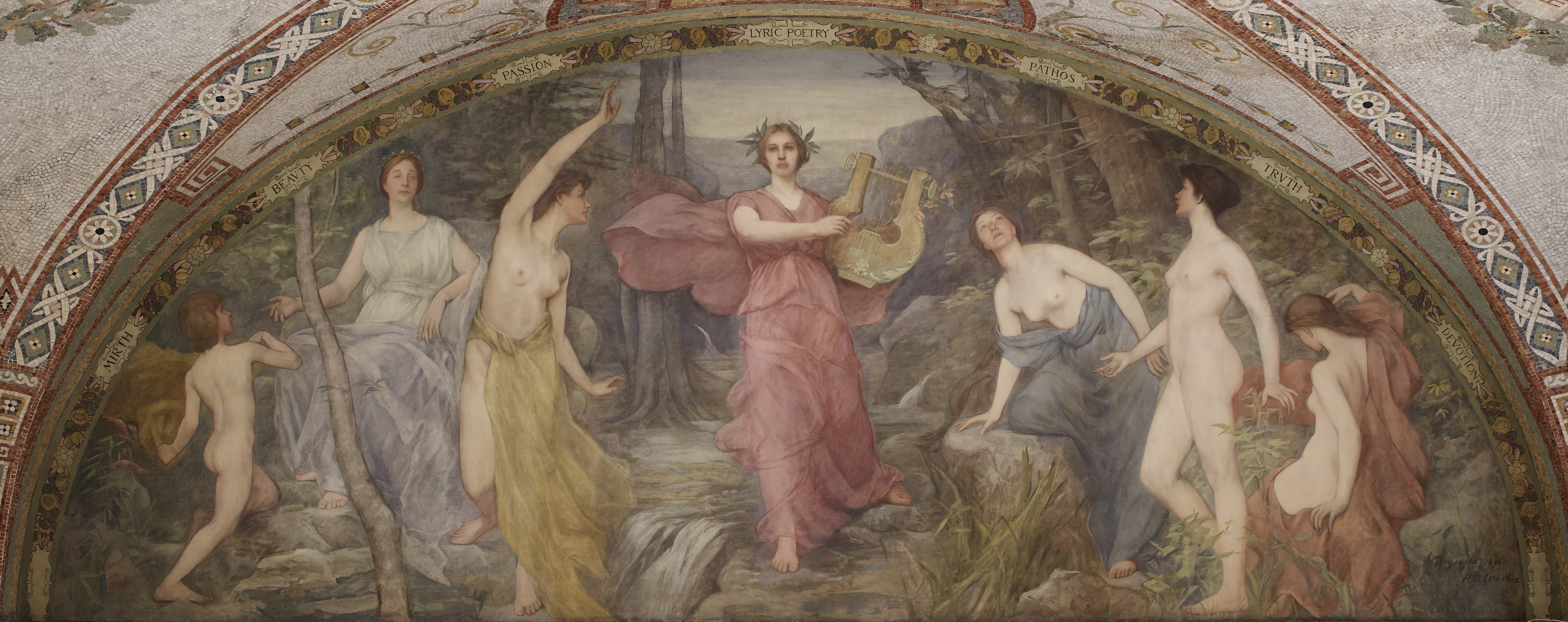
Henry Oliver Walker, Lyric Poetry, 1896

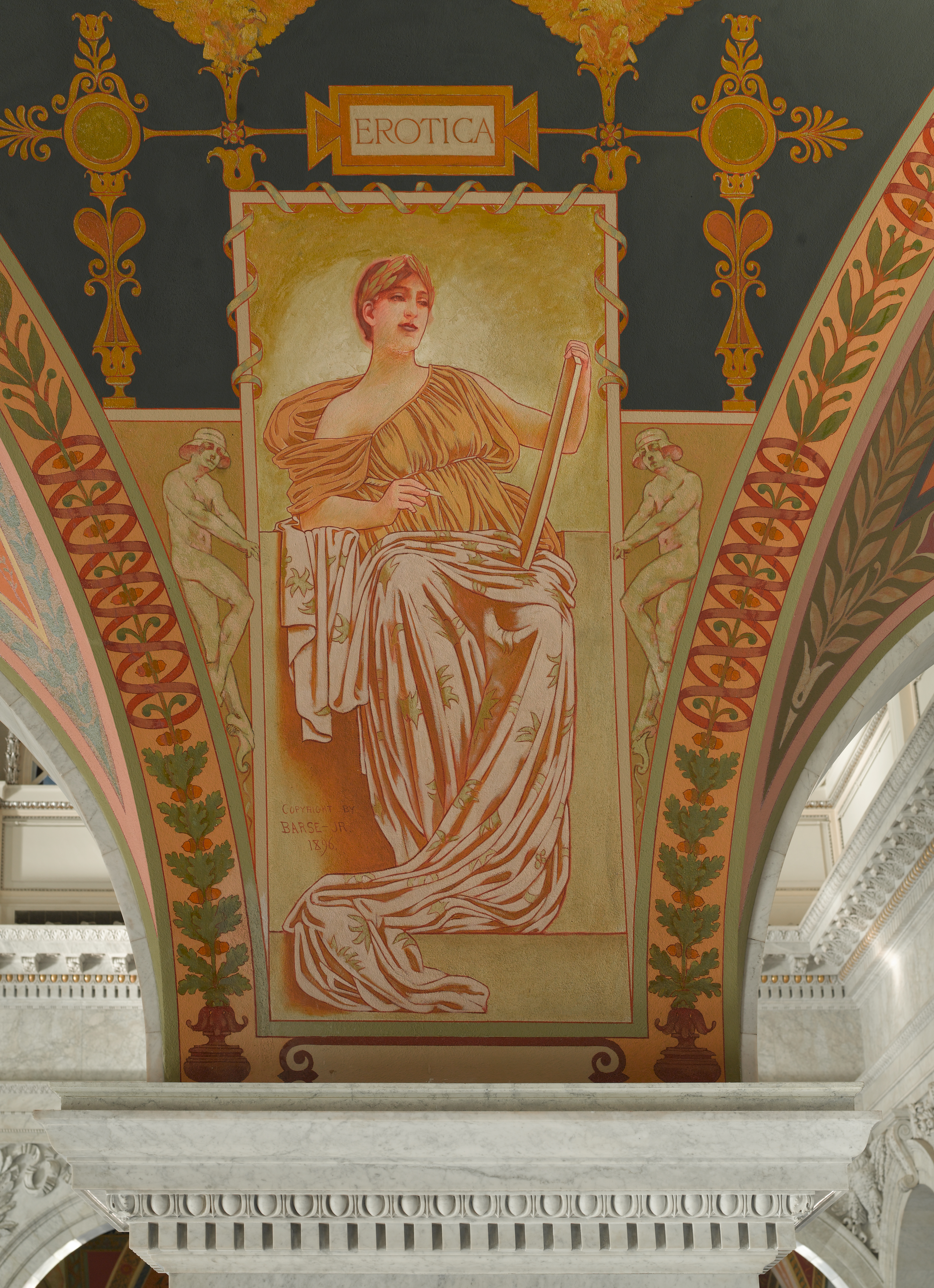
Erotica (Love Poetry), one of the eight panels representing types of literature by George Randolph Barse (1861–1938)

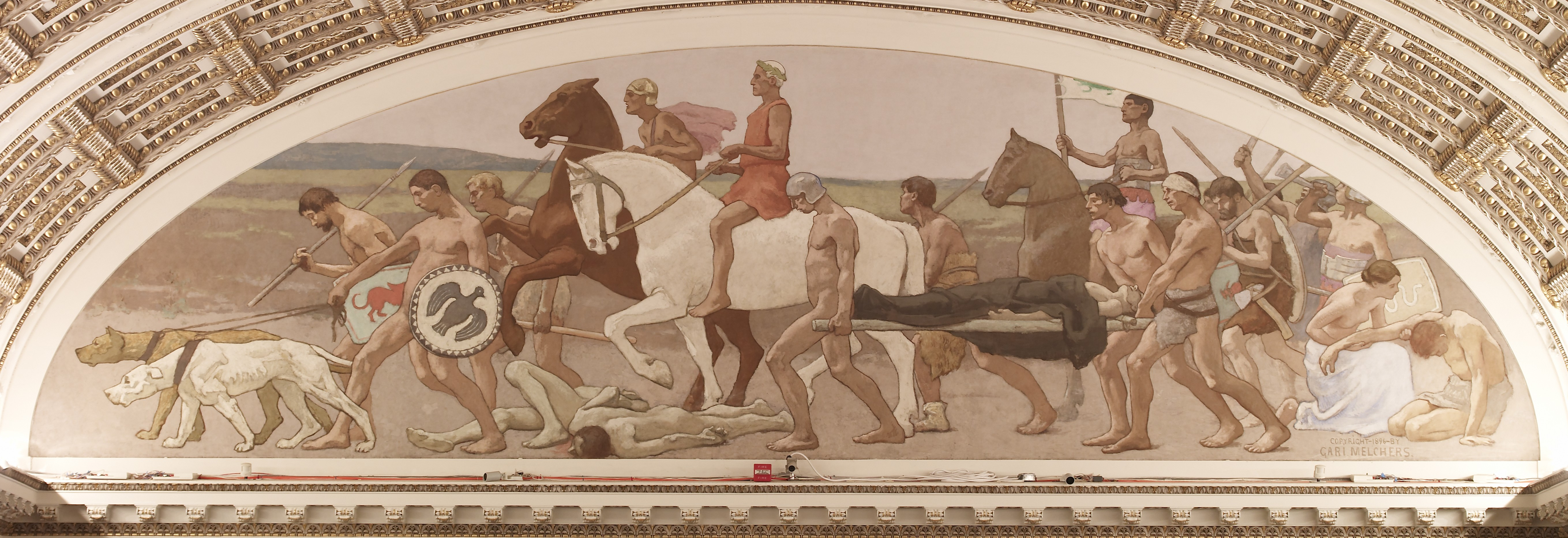
Gari Melchers, Mural of War, 1896

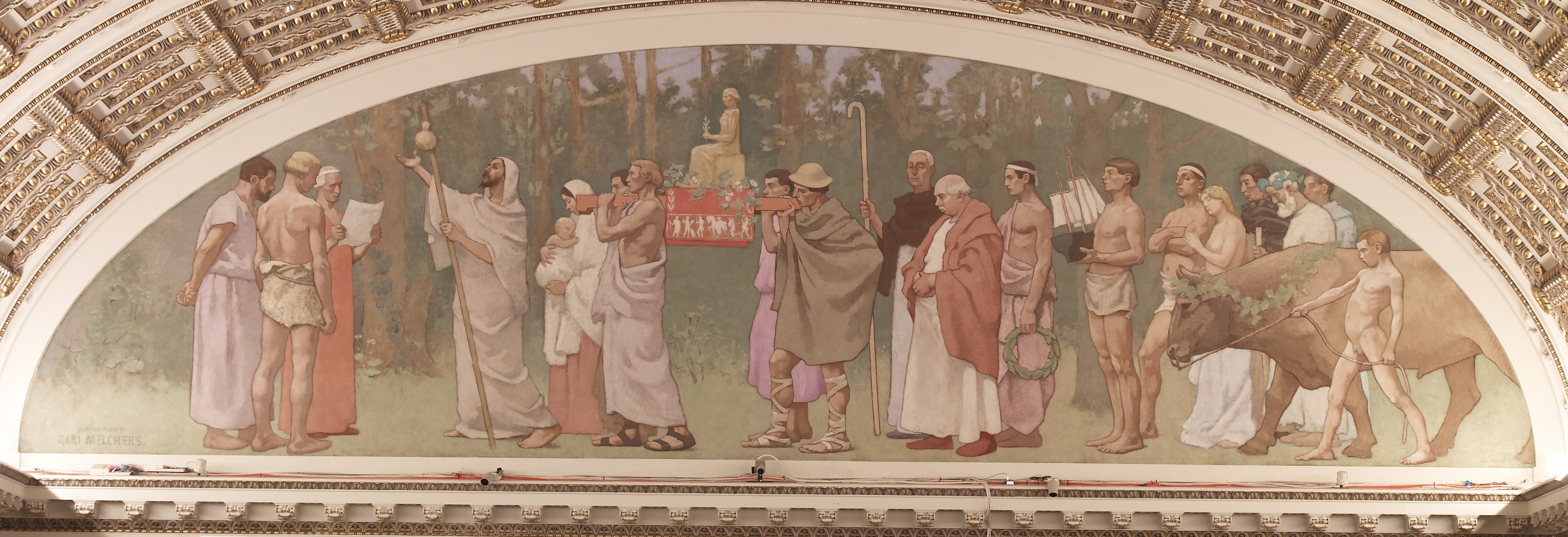
Gari Melchers, Mural of Peace, 1896

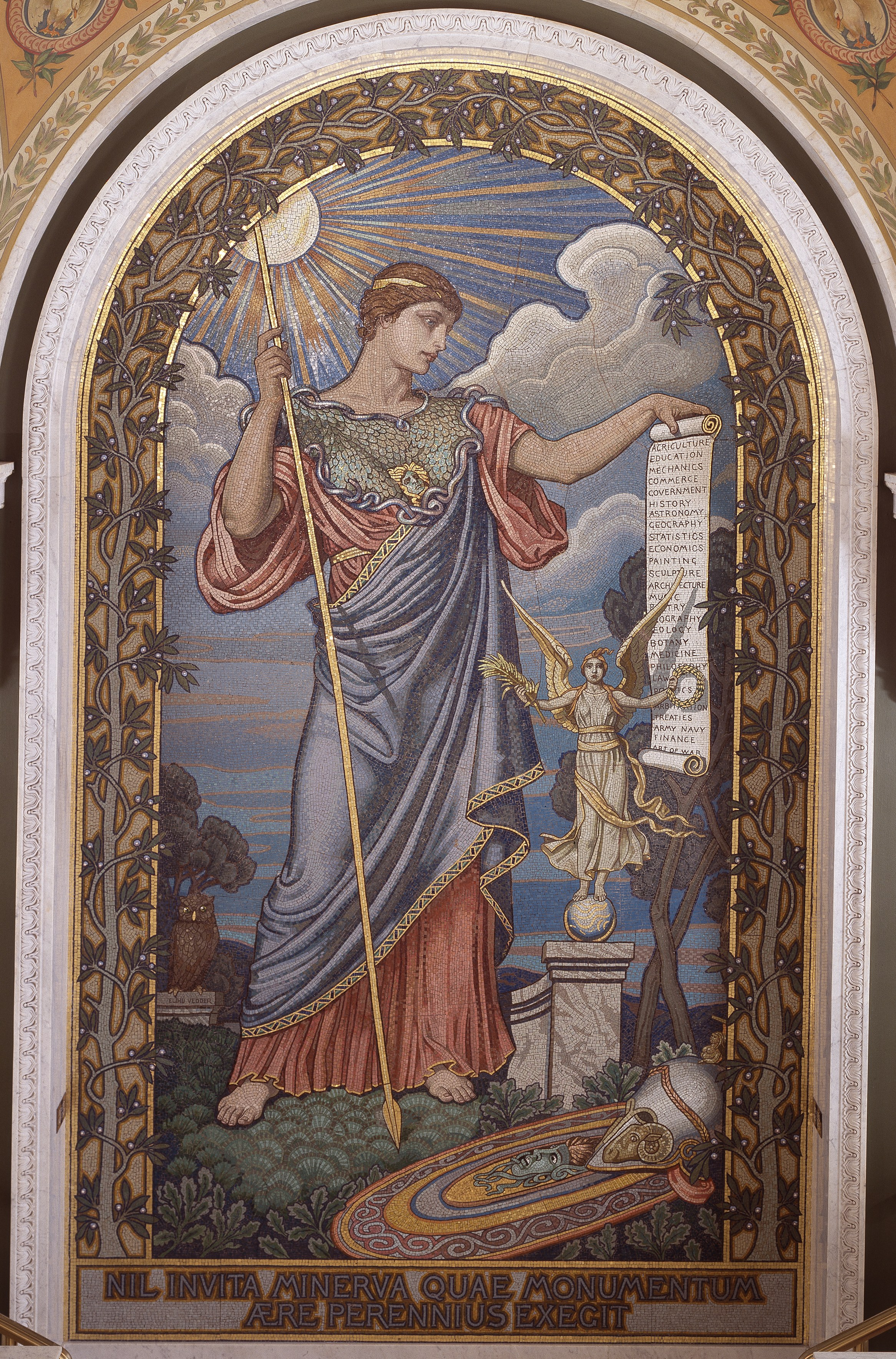
Elihu Vedder, Minerva of Peace, 1896

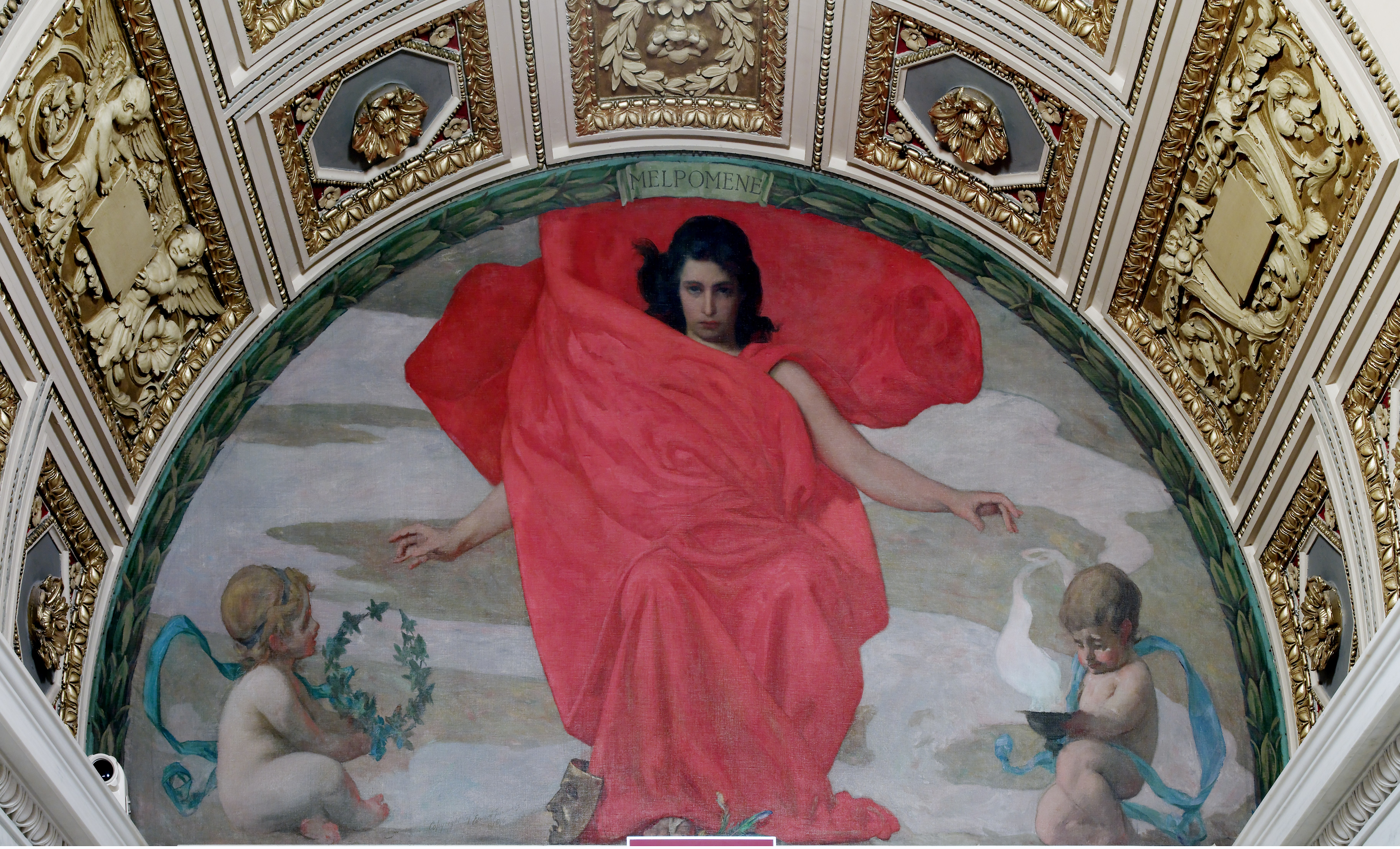
Edward Emerson Simmons, Melpomene, 1896

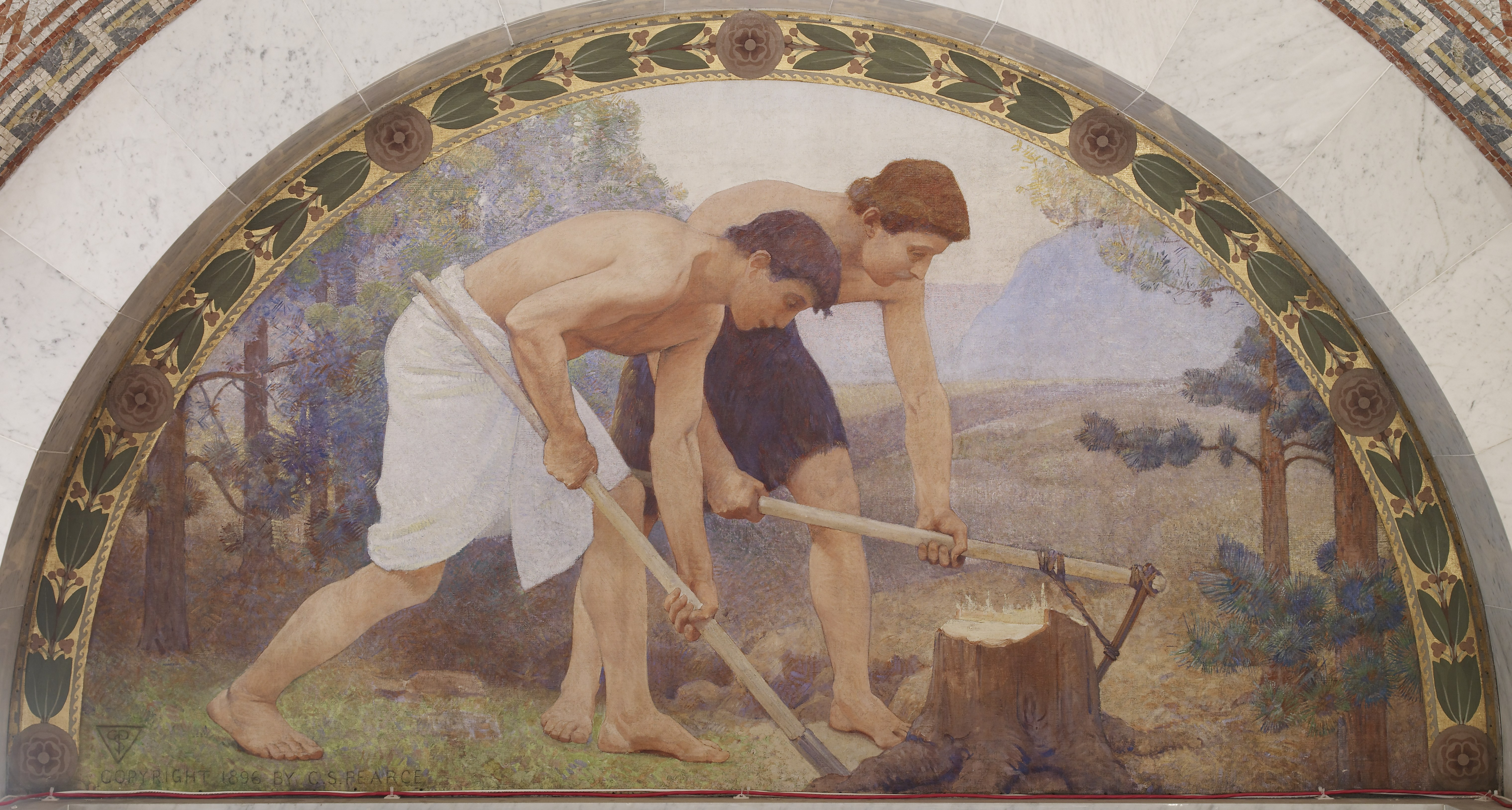
Charles Sprague Pearce, Labor, 1896

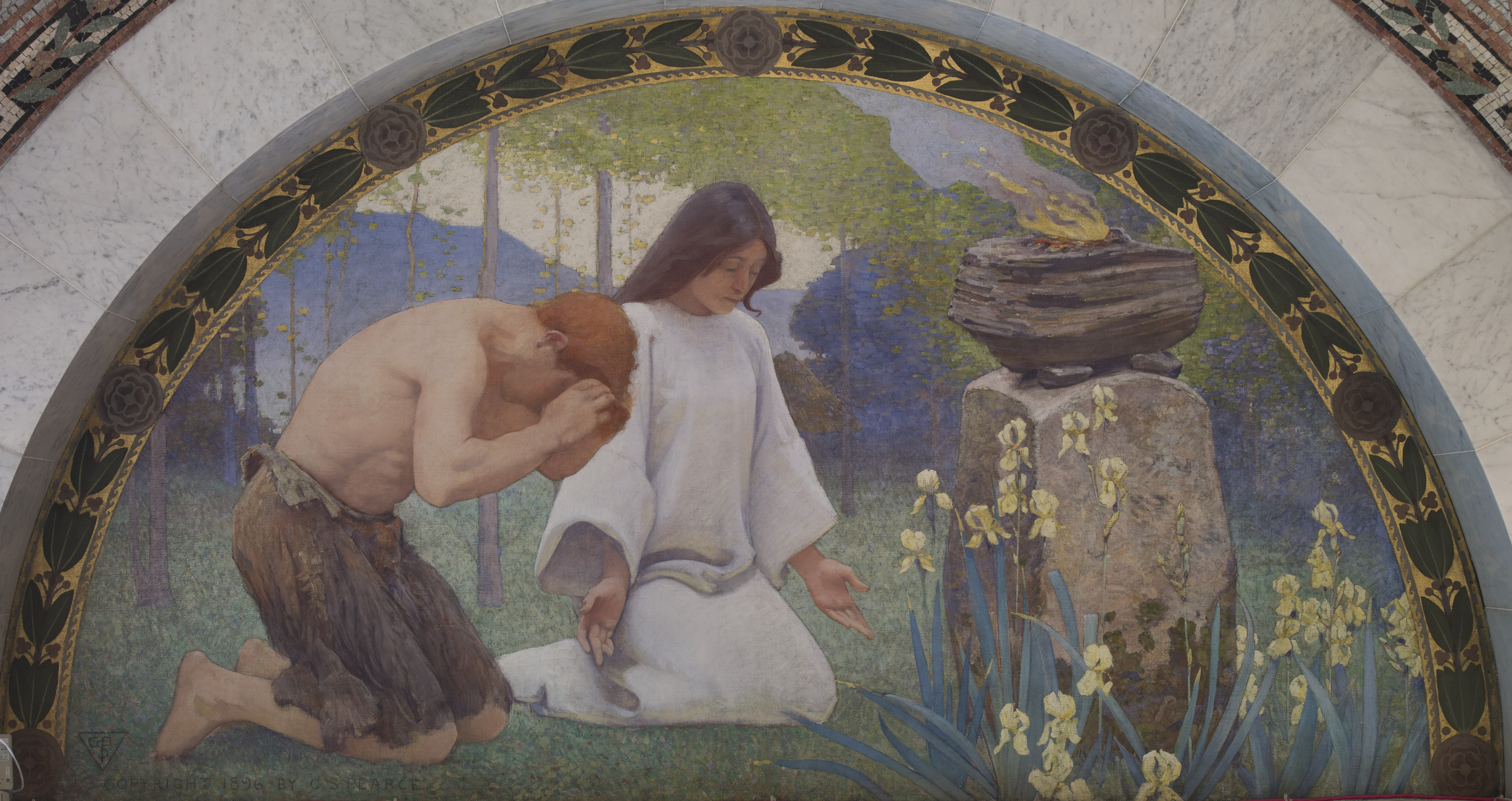
Charles Sprague Pearce, Religion, 1896

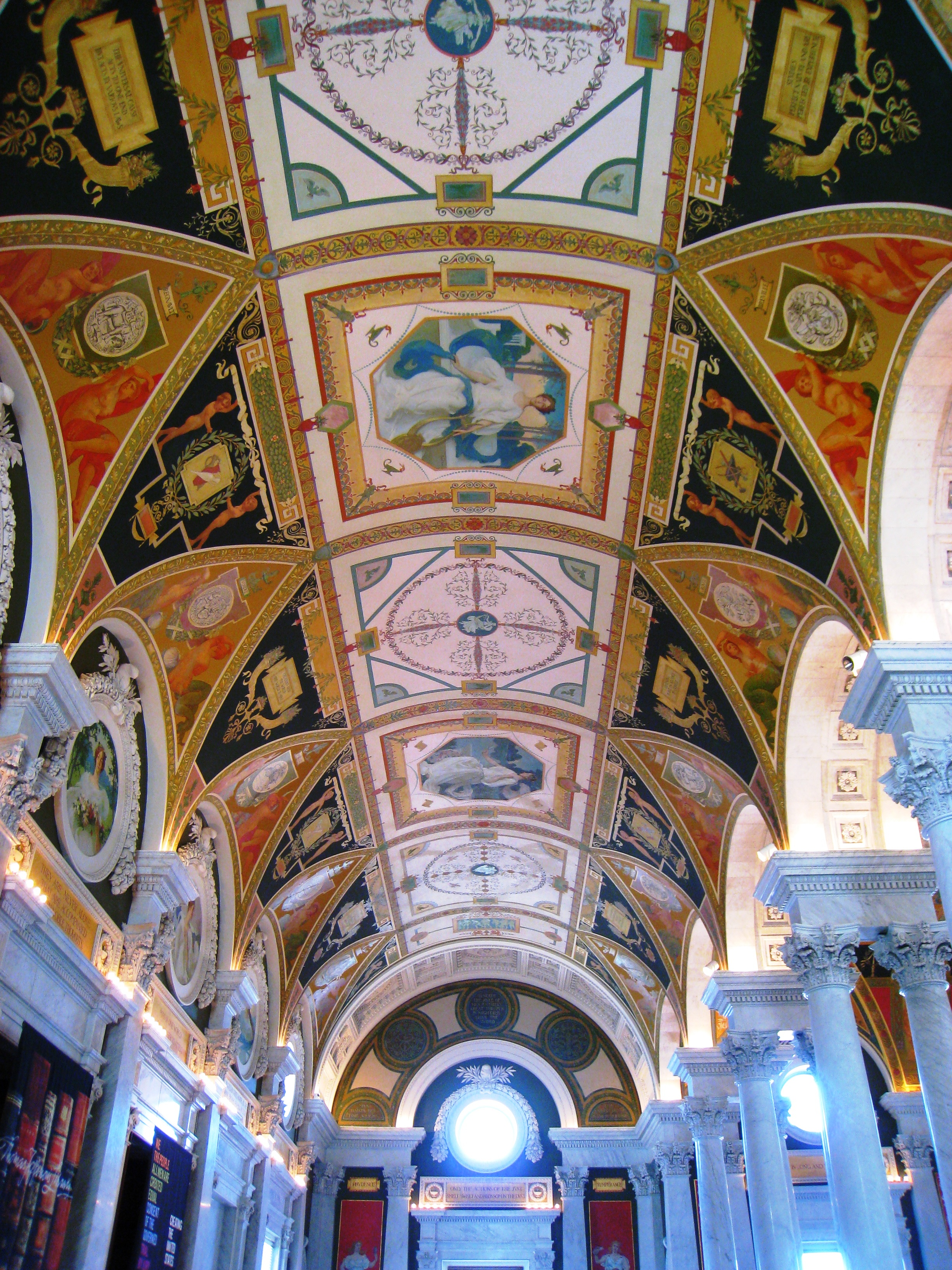
Mural paintings at the corridor

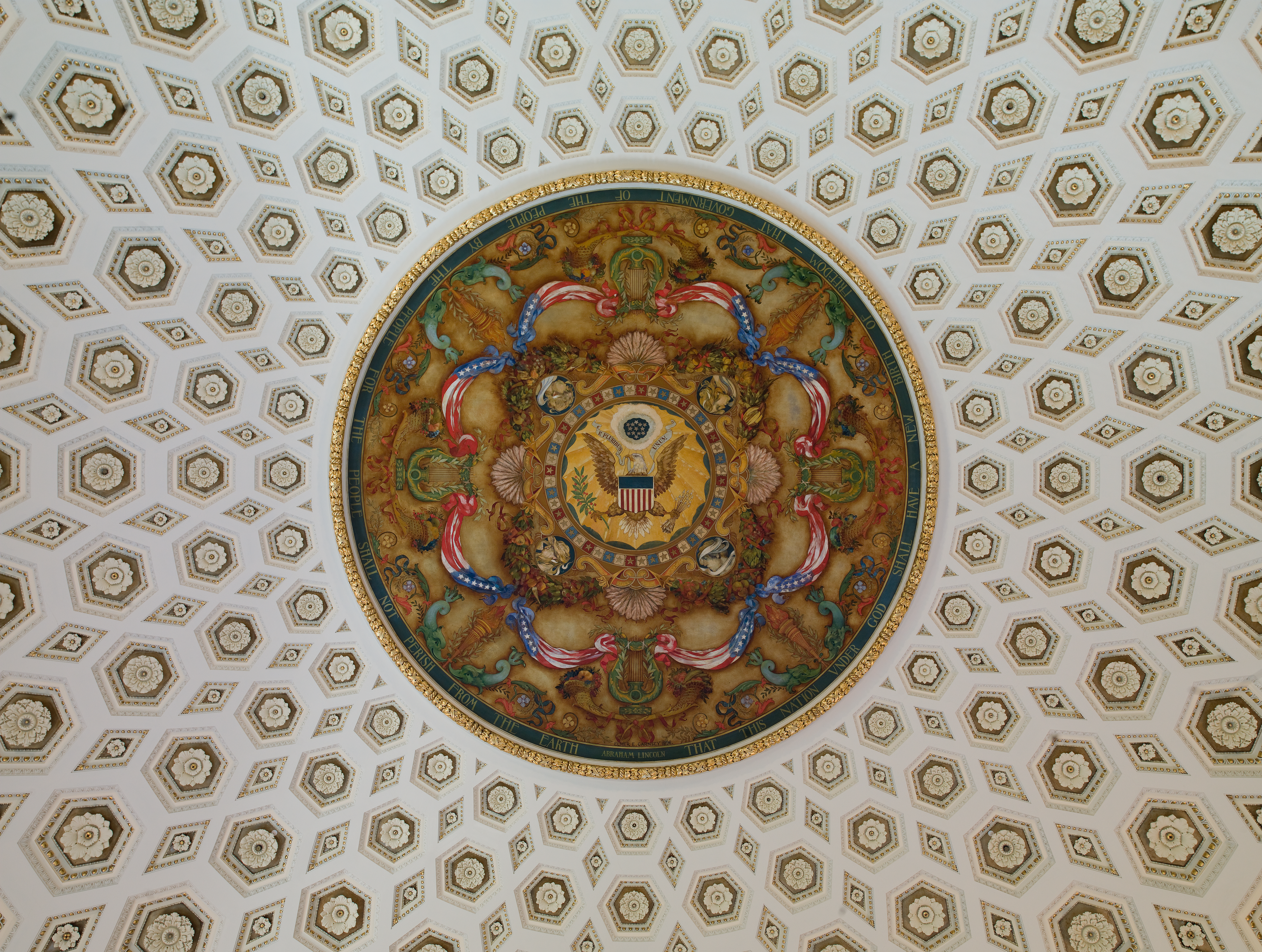
Mural painting, Northeastern Pavilion by Elmer E. Garnsey

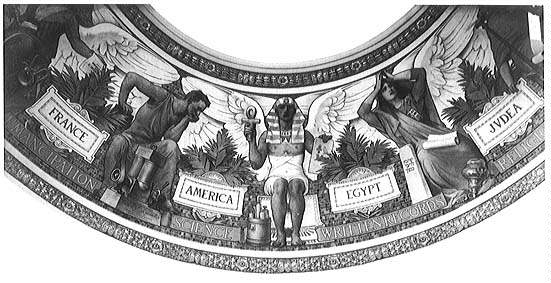
A portion of Edwin Blashfield's Evolution of Civilization, located on the dome above the Main Reading Room, 1896

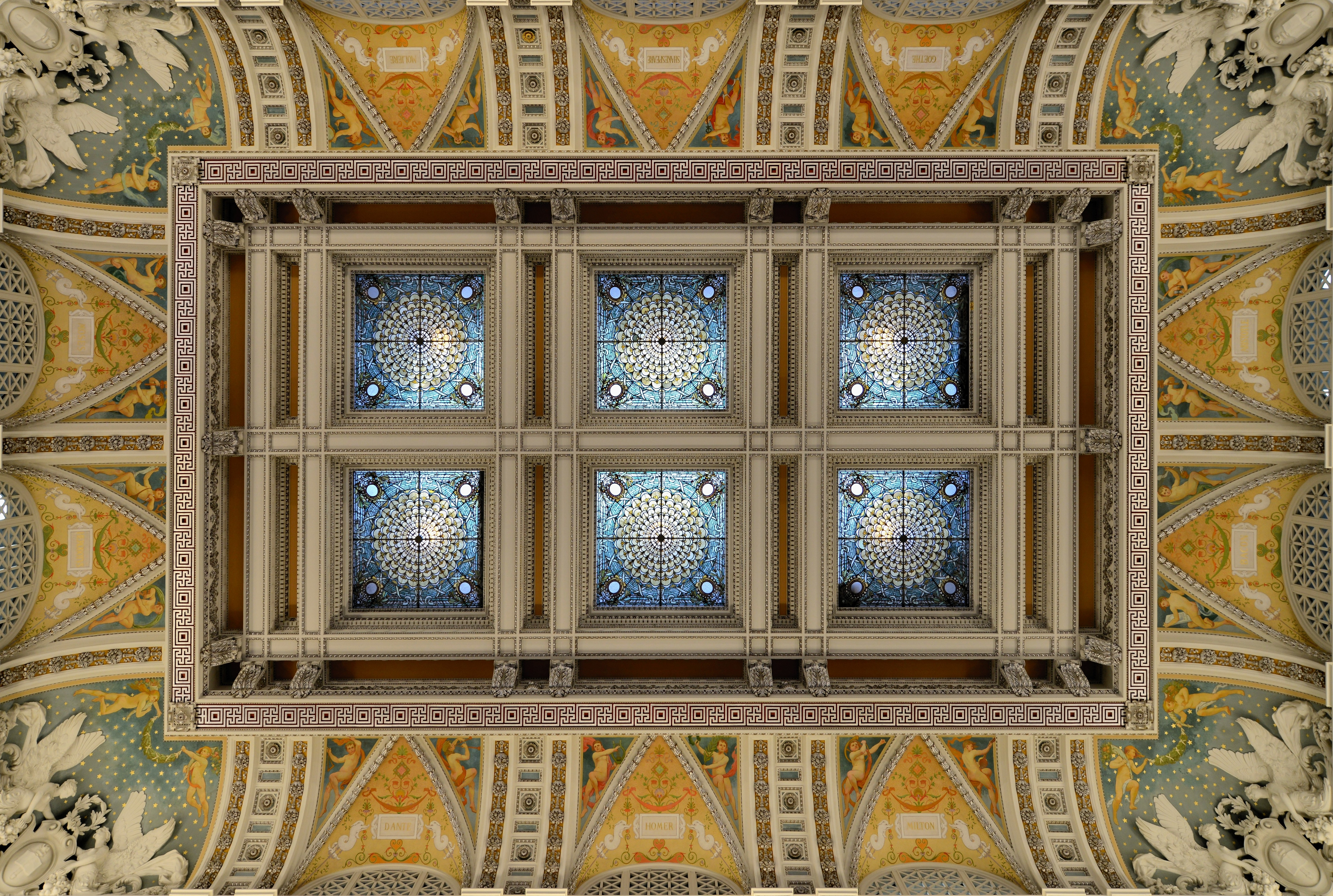
Ceiling of the Great Hall

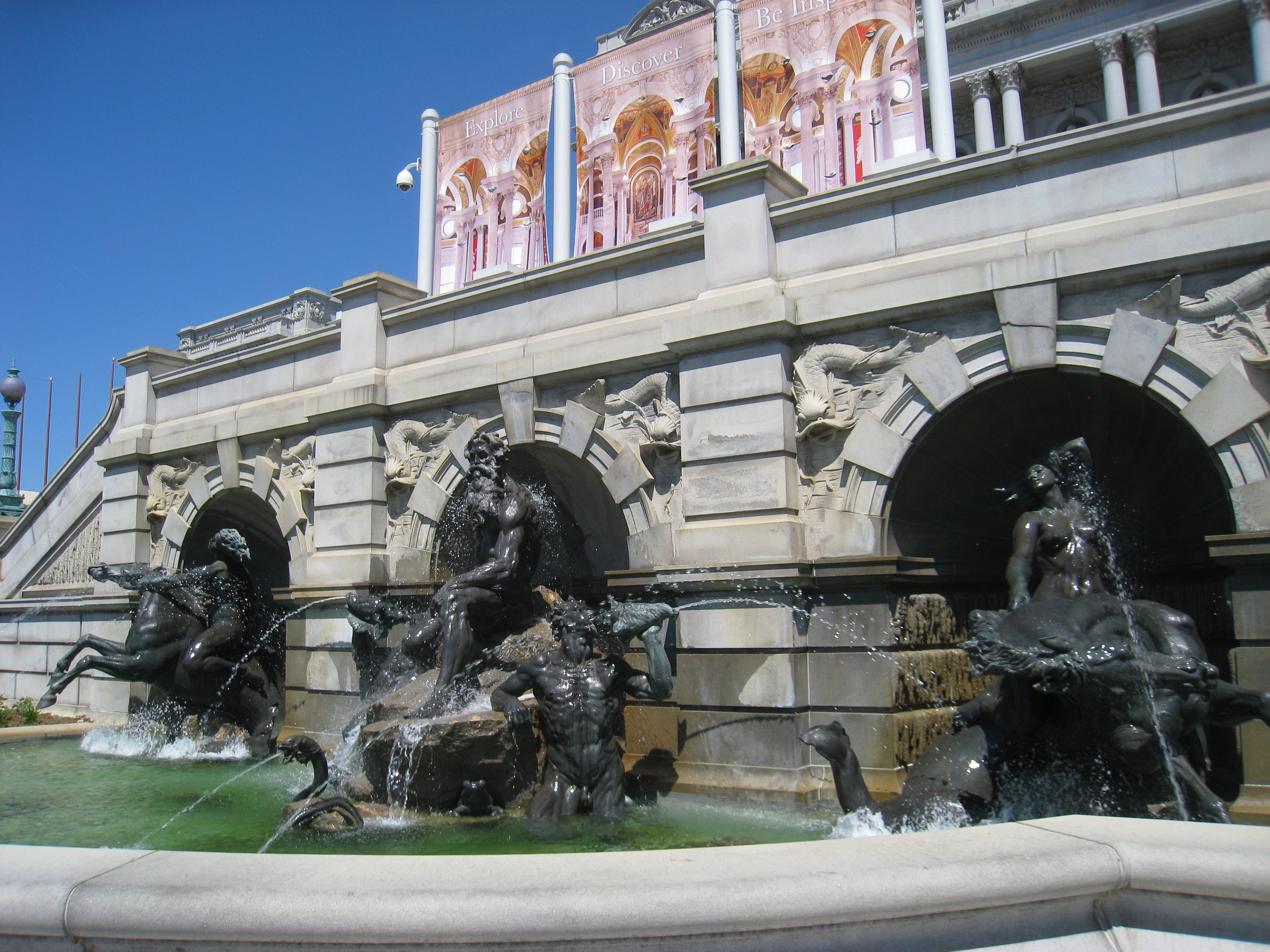
The Court of Neptune Fountain, 1897–98, by Roland Hinton Perry
