= Aristius Fuscus =

(Marcus) Aristius Fuscus was a friend of the Roman poet Horace, and is mentioned in Satire I.9, Ode 1.22 and elsewhere. Horace addresses Epistle 1.10 to Fuscus and links Fuscus and himself as 'twins' separated by their love for the city and the country, respectively. In Horace's Satire 1.9, Fuscus meets Horace struggling with a boor but fails to save Horace.

Porphyrio calls Fuscus an outstanding grammaticus (philologist or grammarian) and a writer of comedies, but Helenius Acron refers to him as a tragedian.

An "Aristius Fuscus" also appears in Ben Jonson's comedy Poetaster (1601).
