= Edward Pearce Casey =

American designer and architect

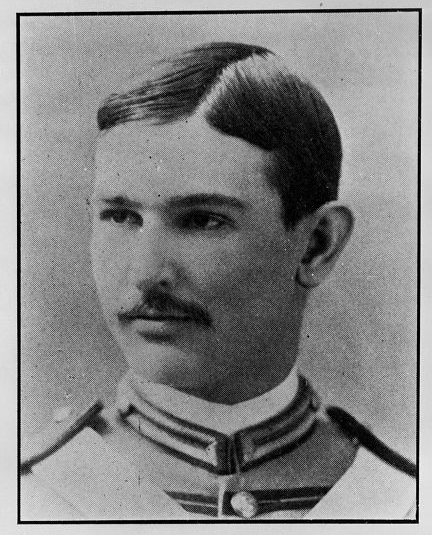
- Casey in his uniform for the New York National Guard, c. 1885
- Born: June 18, 1864; Portland, Maine, U.S.
- Died: January 2, 1940 (aged 75)
- Education: Columbia University
- Occupation: Architect

Edward Pearce Casey (1864–1940) was an American designer and architect, noted for his work in Washington, D.C., and New York City.

== Early life and education ==
Edward Pearce Casey was born June 18, 1864, in Portland, Maine, where his father, Brigadier-General Thomas Lincoln Casey, served during the Civil War. Edward was educated at the Emerson Institute of Washington, D.C., and graduated from the School of Mines of Columbia University. He received the degree of C.E. in 1886 and that of architect in 1888. He studied also at the Ecole des Beaux Arts in Paris, France.

Prior to completion of his schooling, Casey served in the 7th Regiment of the New York National Guard.

== Career and later life ==
In 1892, Casey replaced Paul J. Pelz as architect of the Library of Congress, whose construction his father directed until his death in 1896. In 1893, he was one of the six equal prize winners in the New York City Hall competition, and in 1900 won the first prize for a design for Taft Bridge over Rock Creek in Washington, D.C. In 1901, he won another design competition, for the Ulysses S. Grant Memorial on the National Mall in Washington, D.C.

Soon after completion of the Grant Memorial, Casey moved to New York City, where he continued his architectural practice. In 1905 and 1906, Casey designed a new façade for a rebuild of the rectory at the Episcopal Church of the Incarnation in Manhattan. In 1904, he began designing Memorial Continental Hall, the national headquarters for the Daughters of the American Revolution.

== Death ==
Casey died on January 2, 1940, and is buried in the family plot at the Casey Farm in Rhode Island.
