= Saunderstown, Rhode Island =

- Saunderstown Historic District
- U.S. National Register of Historic Places
- U.S. Historic district
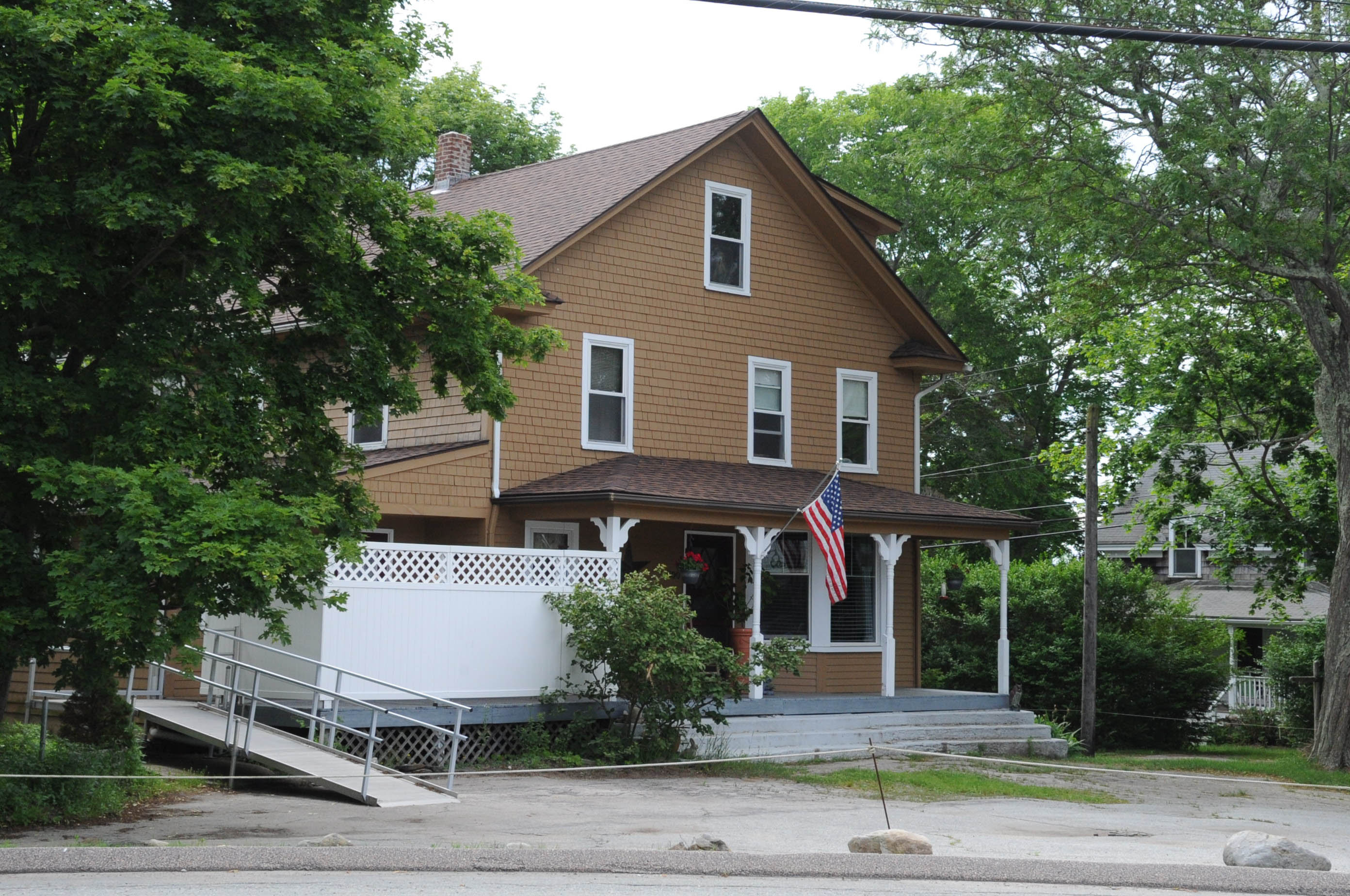
- House in the historic district

- Location within Rhode Island Location within the United States
- Location: Narragansett and North Kingstown, Rhode Island
- Coordinates: 41°30′28″N 71°25′28″W
- Area: 79 acres (32 ha)
- Built: 1856
- Architectural style: Colonial Revival, Bungalow/Craftsman
- MPS: North Kingstown MRA
- NRHP reference No.: 85001647
- Added to NRHP: July 19, 1985

Saunderstown is a small village and historic district spread across the four towns of Narragansett, South Kingstown, Exeter and North Kingstown, Rhode Island, United States. It was named in honor of John Aldrich Saunders, a member of the Saunders family. Saunderstown has its own post office with the ZIP Code of 02874, which also includes a small part of South Kingstown. Its population is 6,245.

== Overview ==
Saunderstown is known as the birthplace of artist Gilbert Stuart, who is best known for painting the portrait of George Washington that is portrayed on the one-dollar bill. The Gilbert Stuart Birthplace and Museum consists of the house in which Stuart was born, a nature trail, and a functional gristmill, and is now open to the public as a museum. Saunderstown is also the location of Casey Farm, an 18th-century plantation that is now a family farm. The farm grows organic vegetables, herbs, and flowers in a Community Supported Agriculture Program. It is operated by Historic New England.

Saunderstown is largely rural and is home to 6,245 people at a population density of 412 people per square mile. The racial makeup is 96.1% white, 0.4% black, 1.1% Asian, 1.2% Hispanic, and 0.2% other.

Saunderstown has a median household income of $135,514.

== Historic district ==
The Saunderstown Historic District encompasses a section of Saunderstown which developed as a boatbuilding center and summer resort area in the late 19th century. It is centered on Ferry Road, Willett Road, and Waterway, between Boston Neck Road and Narragansett Bay. In addition to being home to a number of shipyards, several owned by members of the Saunders family, the area also became noted as a summer resort, hosting Benoni Lockwood and Frances Willing Wharton (a cousin to writer Edith Wharton), as well as the architect and artist Christopher Grant LaFarge, son of the artist John La Farge. This area is mainly residential, with wood-frame houses one or two stories in height, with vernacular styling. Non-residential buildings include a country store, recreation center (which was formerly a fire barn), and the Saunderstown Post Office, which was built in 1902 as a Baptist church.

== See also ==
- National Register of Historic Places listings in Washington County, Rhode Island
