= John Talbott Donoghue =

American artist

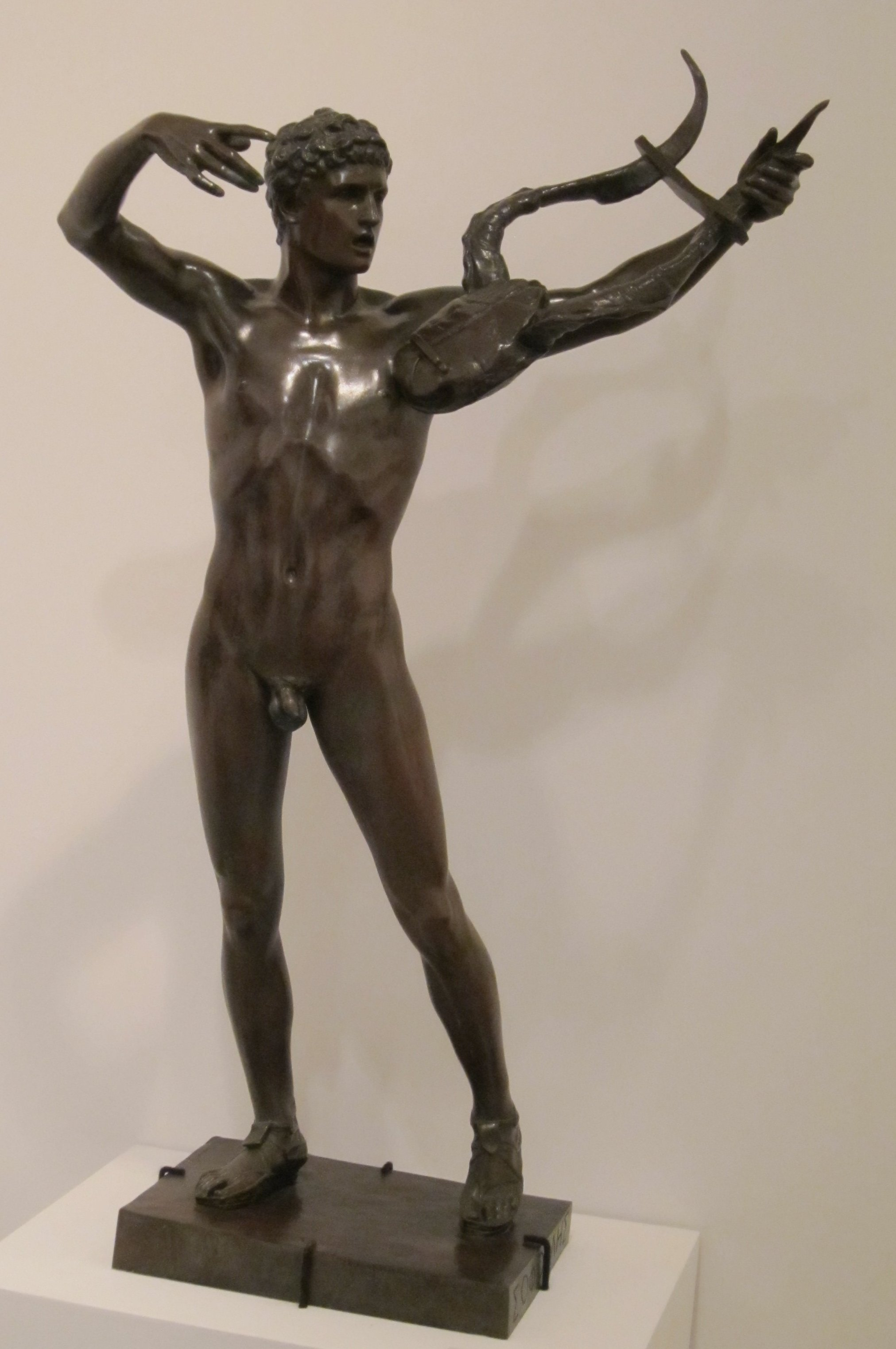
The Young Sophocles Leading the Chorus of Victory after the Battle of Salamis, c. 1889, Honolulu Museum of Art

John Talbott Donoghue (November 19, 1854 – July 1, 1903) was an American artist who was born in Chicago. Although he produced figural sculpture, bas reliefs and paintings, his fame rests primarily on a single bronze sculpture, "The Young Sophocles". This bronze was originally cast in 1885, but later castings are known to exist. It is a full-length nude sculpture of the Greek dramatist Sophocles playing a lyre while leading the chorus of victory after the Battle of Salamis in 480 BCE. John Talbott Donoghue shot himself on July 1, 1903, in Lake Whitney, Connecticut.

The Honolulu Museum of Art and the Metropolitan Museum of Art are among the public collections holding works by John Talbott Donoghue. The latter's The Young Sophocles Leading the Chorus of Victory after the Battle of Salamis is on long-term loan to the Federal Reserve Bank of New York.

During his 1882 lecture tour of North America Oscar Wilde met Donoghue and encouraged Chicagoans to support one "whose work is beautiful — more beautiful than the work of any sculptor I have seen yet, and of whom you should all be proud." His work was also part of the sculpture event in the art competition at the 1928 Summer Olympics.
