= Silas Casey =

American Union Army general

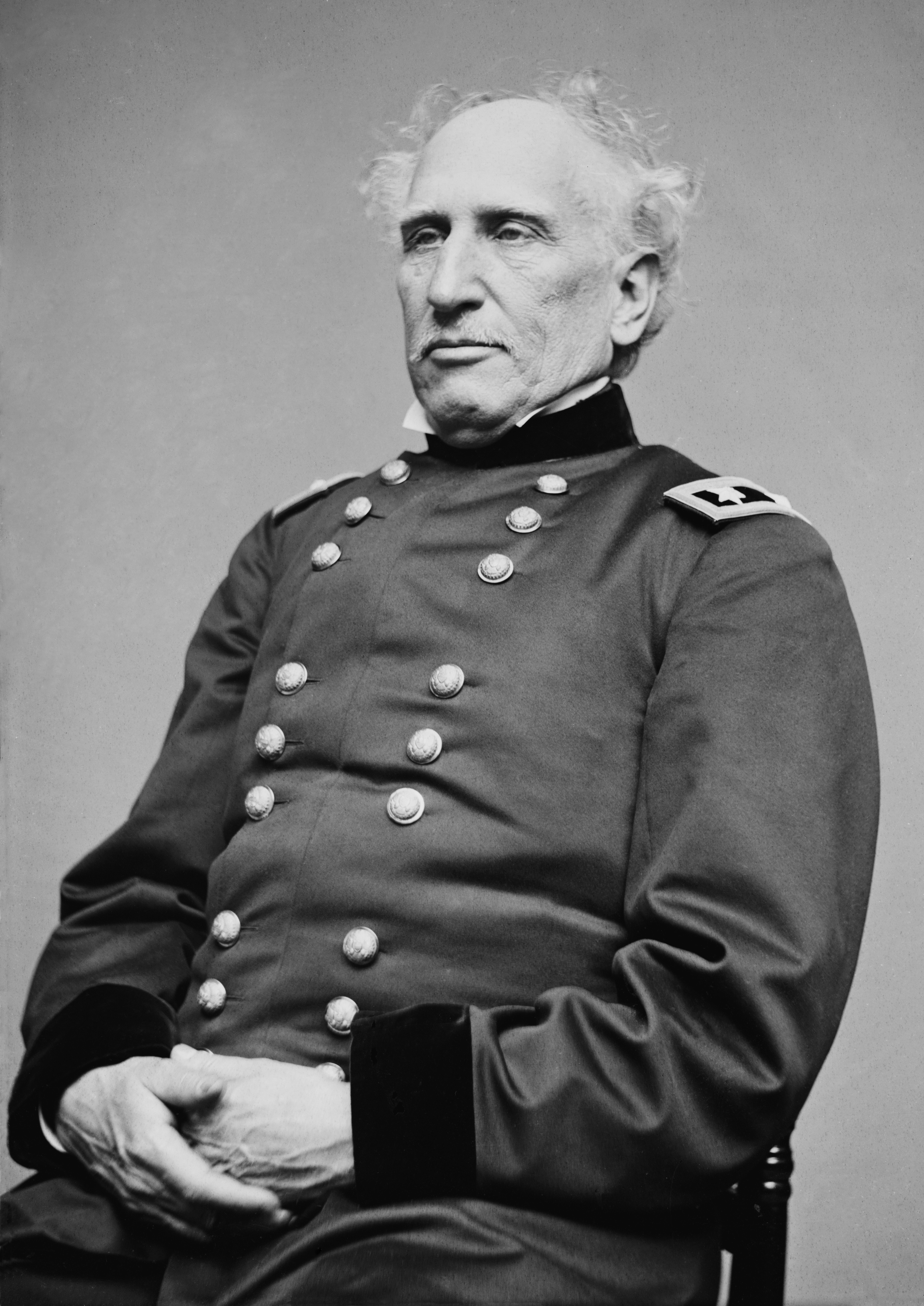
- Silas Casey
- Born: July 12, 1807; East Greenwich, Rhode Island
- Died: January 22, 1882 (aged 74); Brooklyn, New York
- Burial place: Casey farm in North Kingstown, Rhode Island
- Children: Thomas Lincoln Casey Sr. Silas Casey III
- Military career
- Allegiance: United States of America; Union
- Branch: United States Army; Union Army
- Service years: 1826–1868
- Rank: Major general
- Conflicts: Second Seminole War; Mexican-American War; Battle of Contreras; Battle of Churubusco; Battle of Molino del Rey; Battle of Chapultepec; San Juan Dispute; American Civil War; Peninsula campaign; Battle of Seven Pines

Silas Casey (July 12, 1807 – January 22, 1882) was a career United States Army officer who rose to the rank of major general during the American Civil War.

== Early life and military career ==
Casey was born in East Greenwich, Rhode Island. He graduated from the United States Military Academy in 1826 (39th out of 41). He fought in the Second Seminole War under William J. Worth from 1837 to 1842. During the Mexican–American War he fought at the Battle of Contreras and Battle of Churubusco, and was appointed brevet major on August 20, 1847, for gallant conduct. He then fought in the Battle of Molino del Rey and was severely wounded during the Battle of Chapultepec on September 13, 1847.

After the Mexican-American War, he performed frontier duties and escorted topographical parties, including a trip to California around Cape Horn in 1849. He commanded at Camp Picket during the Pig War on San Juan Island from August 10 to October 18, 1859.

=== Civil War ===
Casey was a Lieutenant Colonel of the 9th U.S. Infantry Regiment at the beginning of the war. He was going to be promoted to Colonel of the 4th U.S. Infantry Regiment on October 9 of 1861, however before the promotion could occur Casey was promoted to brigadier general of volunteers on August 31, 1861, shortly after arriving on the East Coast. Casey eventually became a division commander in the IV Corps under Brig. Gen Erasmus D. Keyes.

During the Battle of Seven Pines, fought on May 31 to June 1, 1862, Casey's division was attacked by Daniel H. Hill's Confederates and driven from the field in panic. Gen. George McClellan blamed them for the disaster, in spite of the fact that it was the smallest, least experienced, and least well-equipped division in the army and clearly should not have been placed in such a vulnerable location as the Seven Pines crossroads. Casey was removed from division command and replaced by Brig. Gen John J. Peck. For the remainder of the Peninsula Campaign, Casey and his former division were relegated to a post around army headquarters at Harrison's Landing and kept away from the front lines. After the Seven Days battles, when McClellan conducted a review of the army, the soldiers in Casey's division turned their backs and refused to cheer him.

Later in the year, Casey was promoted to Major General of Volunteers with the retroactive date of rank of May 31, 1862. Following his relief from command by General McClellan, he was assigned to command a provisional brigade in Washington, D.C. from August 1862 to February 1863. He then served as president of the Board for the Examination of Candidates for Officers of Colored Troops from May 22, 1863, to July 5, 1865. This assignment was followed by a leave of absence from July 5 to October 2, 1865.

He wrote the three-volume System of Infantry Tactics, including Infantry Tactics volumes I and II, published by the army on August 11, 1862, and Infantry Tactics for Colored Troops, published on March 9, 1863. The manuals were used by both sides during the Civil War. In December 1862 he was appointed to the board that ultimately convicted Maj. Gen. Fitz John Porter of disobedience and cowardice for his actions at the Second Battle of Bull Run.

At the end of the war, Casey received a brevet (honorary promotion) to the rank of major general dated March 15, 1865. He was mustered out of volunteer service and reverted to his regular army rank of colonel on August 24, 1865.

== Postbellum activities and death ==
Casey served in command of the 4th Infantry Regiment at Ft. Wayne in Detroit, Michigan from October 2, 1865 to April 5, 1867. He was then assigned as Commissioner to examine the War Claims of Ohio from April 17 to December 31, 1867 and was on a Court of Inquiry in early 1868. He was placed on waiting orders from March to October, 1868. Casey retired from the army on July 8, 1868, at the age of 61, having served over 40 years on active duty. However, he served one more assignment as a member of the Retiring Board, in New York City, from October 28, 1868 to April 26, 1869.

In 1870, he became a hereditary member of the Massachusetts Society of the Cincinnati in succession to his uncle Dr. Lincoln Goodale, who was the son of Brevet Major Nathan Goodale. General Casey was also a member of the Military Order of the Loyal Legion of the United States, as were all three of his sons.

In 1880 Casey became a veteran member of the Aztec Club of 1847—a military society originally composed of officers who had served in the occupation of Mexico City and later extended its membership to all United States officers who had served during the Mexican War and their descendants.

Casey died of a digestive system ailment in Brooklyn, New York, on January 22, 1882, and is buried at Casey Farm in Saunderstown, Rhode Island.

== Family ==
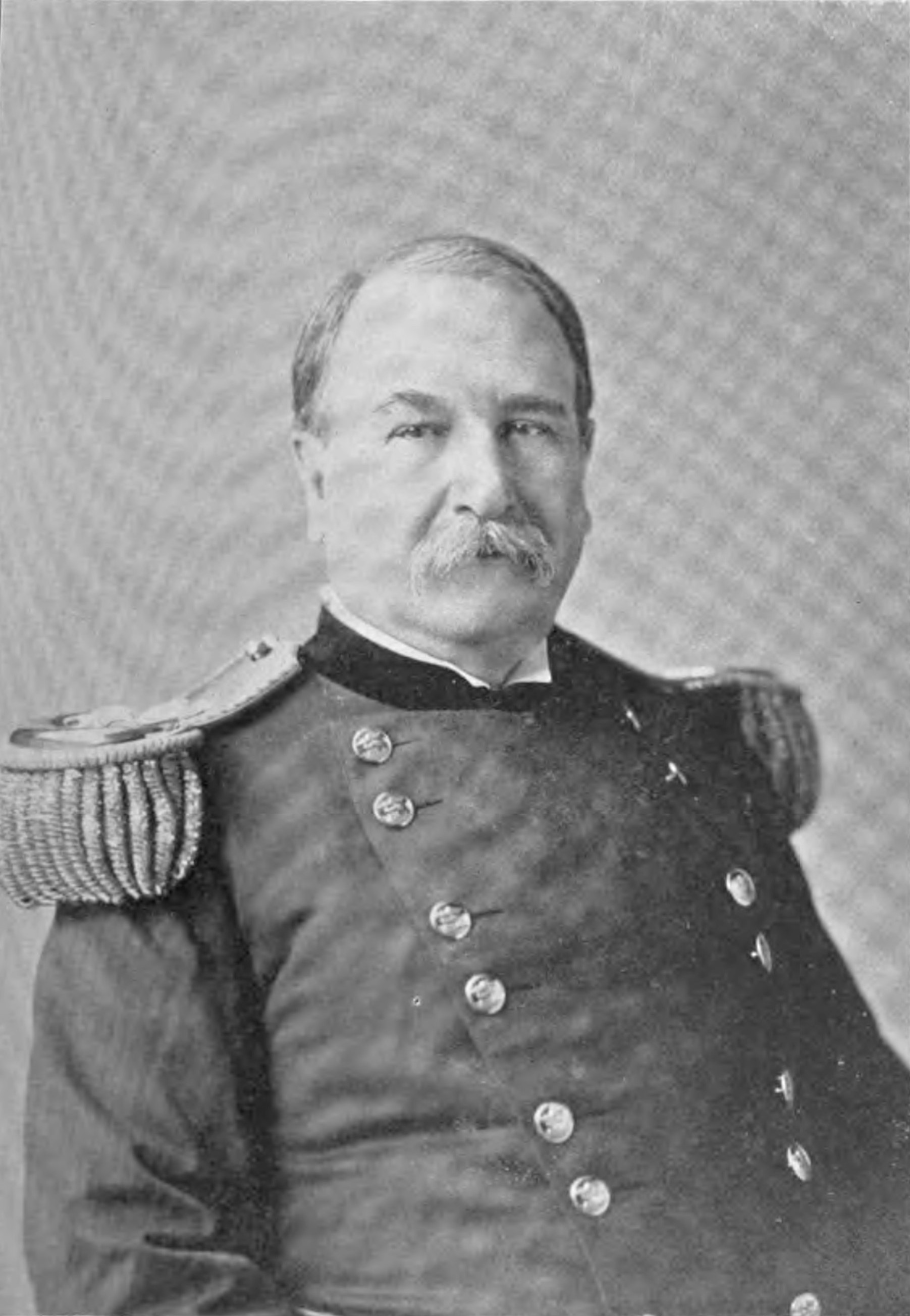
General Thomas Lincoln Casey Sr.

Casey's sons included Rear Admiral Silas Casey III, USN, who served as commander of the Pacific Squadron, 1901–1903; Brigadier General Thomas Lincoln Casey, who oversaw the completion of the Washington Monument and served as Chief of Engineers of the US Army, and Lieutenant Edward Wanton Casey, an Army officer of Cheyenne Scouts, Troop L, 8th Cavalry Regiment, who was killed in action with the Sioux tribe on January 7, 1891.

== See also ==
- List of American Civil War generals (Union)
