= Grammaticus =

Grammaticus is the Latin word for grammarian; see Grammarian (Greco-Roman). It is also used to refer to a Roman patrician school.

As an agnomen, it may refer to:

- Ammonius Grammaticus (4th century), Greek grammarian
- Diomedes Grammaticus (4th century), Latin grammarian
- Musaeus Grammaticus (6th century), Greek poet
- Virgilius Maro Grammaticus (7th century), early medieval Latin writer
- John VII of Constantinople, known as John VII Grammaticus (9th century), Ecumenical Patriarch of Constantinople
- Ælfric of Eynsham, known in Latin as Alfricus Grammaticus (10th century), Anglo-Saxon abbot and author
- Saxo Grammaticus (circa 1150 – 1220), Danish medieval historian

As a pseudonym:

- Edward Musgrave Blaiklock, (1903–1983), British born New Zealand author, wrote as "Grammaticus"

== See also ==
- Damian Grammaticas
