= America's Favorite Architecture =

Most popular works of architecture in the US

"America's Favorite Architecture" is a list of buildings and other structures identified as the most popular works of architecture in the United States.

In 2006 and 2007, the American Institute of Architects (AIA) sponsored research to identify the most popular works of architecture in the United States. Harris Interactive conducted the study by first polling a sample of the AIA membership and later polling a sample of the public.

In the first phase of the study, 2,448 AIA members were interviewed and asked to identify their "favorite" structures. Each was asked to name up to 20 structures in each of 15 defined categories. The 248 structures that were named by at least six of the AIA members were then included in a list of structures to be included in the next phase, a survey of the general public. The survey of the public involved a total of 2,214 people, each of whom rated many photographs of buildings and other structures drawn from the list of 248 structures that had been created by polling the architects. The public's preferences were ranked using a "likeability" scale developed for the study.

As part of the commemoration of the organization's 150th anniversary in 2007, the AIA announced the list of the 150 highest-ranked structures as "America's Favorite Architecture". New York City is the location of 32 structures on the list, more than any other place. Of the 10 top-ranked structures, 6 are in Washington, D.C., which is the location of 17 of the 150 structures on the complete list. Chicago has 16 structures on the list.

The 150 top-ranked structures are listed below:

== List of "America's Favorites" ==
Rank	Structure	City	State	Architect(s)	Built	Style	Picture
1	Empire State Building	New York	NY	William F. Lamb	1930–31	Art Deco	
2	White House	Washington	DC	James Hoban	1792–1800	Neoclassical	
3	Washington National Cathedral	Washington	DC	George Frederick Bodley, Henry Vaughan and Philip H. Frohman	1906–88	Gothic Revival	
4	Jefferson Memorial	Washington	DC	John Russell Pope	1939–43	Neoclassical	
5	Golden Gate Bridge	San Francisco	CA	Irving F. Morrow and Gertrude C. Morrow	1933–37	Art Deco	
6	United States Capitol	Washington	DC	William Thornton	1793–1962	Neoclassical	
7	Lincoln Memorial	Washington	DC	Henry Bacon	1914–22	Greek Revival	
8	Biltmore Estate	Asheville	NC	Richard Morris Hunt; Frederick Law Olmsted	1889–95	Châteauesque	
9	Chrysler Building	New York	NY	William Van Alen	1928–30	Art Deco	
10	Vietnam Veterans Memorial	Washington	DC	Maya Lin	1982	Modern	
11	St. Patrick's Cathedral	New York	NY	James Renwick	1858–78	Gothic Revival	
12	Washington Monument	Washington	DC	Robert Mills	1848–54	Egyptian Revival	
13	Grand Central Terminal	New York	NY	Reed and Stem; Warren and Wetmore	1903–13	Beaux-Arts	
14	Gateway Arch	St. Louis	MO	Eero Saarinen	1963–65	Modern	
15	Supreme Court of the United States	Washington	DC	Cass Gilbert	1932–35	Neoclassical	
16	St. Regis	New York	NY	Trowbridge & Livingston	1904	Beaux-Arts	
17	Metropolitan Museum of Art	New York	NY	Calvert Vaux; McKim, Mead & White; Richard Morris Hunt; Kevin Roche; John Dinkeloo	1895; 2012	Beaux-Arts	
18	Hotel Del Coronado	Coronado	CA	James W. Reid	1888	Victorian	
19	World Trade Center (original towers)	New York	NY	Minoru Yamasaki	1966–75	Modern	
20	Brooklyn Bridge	New York	NY	John Augustus Roebling	1869-83	Gothic Revival	
21	Philadelphia City Hall	Philadelphia	PA	John McArthur Jr.	1871–1901	Second Empire	
22	Bellagio Hotel and Casino	Las Vegas	NV	Deruyter Butler; Atlandia Design	1995–98	Italianate	
23	Cathedral of St. John the Divine	New York	NY	Heins & LaFarge; Ralph Adams Cram	1892–1911	Gothic Revival	
24	Philadelphia Museum of Art	Philadelphia	PA	Horace Trumbauer, Zantzinger, Borie, and Medary	1919–28	Neoclassical	
25	Trinity Church	Boston	MA	Henry Hobson Richardson	1872–77	Richardsonian Romanesque	
26	Ahwahnee Hotel	Yosemite Valley	CA	Gilbert Stanley Underwood	1926–27	National Park Service Rustic	
27	Monticello	Charlottesville	VA	Thomas Jefferson	1768–1826	Georgian	
28	Library of Congress	Washington	DC	John L. Smithmeyer and Paul J. Pelz	1890–97	Beaux-Arts	
29	Fallingwater	Mill Run	PA	Frank Lloyd Wright	1936–39	Modern/Organic	
30	Taliesin	Spring Green	WI	Frank Lloyd Wright	1911; 1914; 1925	Prairie School	
31	Wrigley Field	Chicago	IL	Zachary Taylor Davis	1911–14	Jewel Box Stadium	
32	Wanamaker's Department Store	Philadelphia	PA	Daniel Burnham	1909-11	Neo-Renaissance	
33	Rose Center for Earth and Space	New York	NY	James Stewart Polshek	2000	Structural Expressionist / Postmodern	
34	National Gallery of Art (West Building)	Washington	DC	John Russell Pope	1938–41	Neoclassical	
35	Allegheny County Courthouse	Pittsburgh	PA	Henry Hobson Richardson	1883–88	Richardsonian Romanesque	
36	Old Faithful Inn	Yellowstone National Park	WY	Robert Reamer	1903–27	National Park Service Rustic	
37	Washington Union Station	Washington	DC	Daniel Burnham	1908; 1988	Beaux-Arts	
38	Tribune Tower	Chicago	IL	John Mead Howells; Raymond Hood	1923–25	Gothic Revival	
39	Delano Hotel	Miami Beach	FL	Robert Swartburg; Philippe Starck (interior)	1947; 1994	Art Deco	
40	Union Station	St. Louis	MO	Theodore C. Link	1892	Romanesque	
41	Hearst Residence	San Simeon	CA	Julia Morgan	1919–1947	Spanish Revival	
42	Willis (formerly Sears) Tower	Chicago	IL	Fazlur Rahman Khan Bruce Graham	1970–74	Modern	
43	Thomas Crane Public Library	Quincy	MA	Henry Hobson Richardson	1881–82	Richardsonian Romanesque	
44	Woolworth Building	New York	NY	Cass Gilbert	1910–12	Gothic Revival	
45	Cincinnati Union Terminal	Cincinnati	OH	Fellheimer & Wagner	1928–33	Art Deco	
46	Waldorf Astoria	New York	NY	Schultze & Weaver	1929–31	Art Deco	
47	New York Public Library	New York	NY	Carrère and Hastings	1897–1911	Beaux-Arts	
48	Carnegie Hall	New York	NY	William B. Tuthill; Richard Morris Hunt and Dankmar Adler, consulting architects	1890–91	Italianate	
49	San Francisco City Hall	San Francisco	CA	Arthur Brown Jr.	1913–16	Beaux-Arts	
50	Virginia State Capitol	Richmond	VA	Thomas Jefferson	1785–88	Neoclassical	
51	Cadet Chapel, Air Force Academy	Colorado Springs	CO	Walter Netsch	1959–62	Futurist	
52	Field Museum of Natural History	Chicago	IL	Daniel Burnham and Graham, Anderson, Probst and White	1915–21	Neoclassical	
53	Apple, 5th Avenue	New York	NY	Bohlin Cywinski Jackson	2005–06	Structural Expressionist	
54	Fisher Fine Arts Library	Philadelphia	PA	Frank Furness	1888–90	Victorian	
55	Mauna Kea Beach Hotel	Kohala Coast	HI	Skidmore, Owings & Merrill	1965	Modern	
56	Rockefeller Center	New York	NY	Reinhard & Hofmeister, Corbett, Harrison & Macmurray, Raymond Hood, Godley & Fouilhoux	1930–39	Art Deco	
57	Denver International Airport	Denver	CO	Fentress Bradburn Architects	1989–95	Postmodern	
58	Ames Free Library	North Easton	MA	Henry Hobson Richardson	1877–79	Richardsonian Romanesque	
59	Milwaukee Art Museum	Milwaukee	WI	Santiago Calatrava	1994–2001	Postmodern	
60	Thorncrown Chapel	Eureka Springs	AR	E. Fay Jones	1980	Prairie School	
61	Transamerica Pyramid	San Francisco	CA	William Pereira	1969–72	Modern	
62	333 Wacker Drive	Chicago	IL	Kohn Pedersen Fox	1979–83	Modern	
63	Smithsonian National Air and Space Museum	Washington	DC	Gyo Obata	1972–76	Modern	
64	Faneuil Hall	Boston	MA	Benjamin Thompson	1740–42	Georgian	
65	Crystal Cathedral	Garden Grove	CA	Philip Johnson	1977–80	Structural Expressionist / Postmodern	
66	Gamble House	Pasadena	CA	Greene and Greene	1908–09	American Craftsman	
67	Nebraska State Capitol	Lincoln	NE	Bertram Grosvenor Goodhue	1922–32	Art Deco / Neoclassical	
68	New York Times Building	New York	NY	Renzo Piano	2003–07	Structural Expressionist	
69	Salt Lake City Public Library	Salt Lake City	UT	Moshe Safdie	2000–03	Structural Expressionist / Postmodern	
70	Walt Disney World Dolphin and Swan Hotels	Lake Buena Vista	FL	Michael Graves	1987–88	Postmodern	
71	Hearst Tower	New York	NY	Norman Foster	2003–06	Structural Expressionist	
72	Flatiron Building	New York	NY	Daniel Burnham	1902	Beaux-Arts / Chicago school	
73	Lake Point Tower	Chicago	IL	Schipporeit and Heinrich	1965–68	Modern	
74	Guggenheim Museum	New York	NY	Frank Lloyd Wright	1956–59	Modern	
75	Union Station	Los Angeles	CA	The Parkinsons	1939	Spanish Revival	
76	Willard Hotel	Washington	DC	Henry Janeway Hardenbergh	1901	Beaux-Arts	
77	Sever Hall, Harvard University	Cambridge	MA	Henry Hobson Richardson	1878–80	Richardsonian Romanesque	
78	Broadmoor Hotel	Colorado Springs	CO	Warren & Wetmore	1918	Spanish Revival	
79	Ronald Reagan Building	Washington	DC	James Ingo Freed	1989–98	Postmodern, Neotraditional	
80	Phillips Exeter Academy Library	Exeter	NH	Louis Kahn	1965–71	Modern	
81	The Plaza Hotel	New York	NY	Henry J. Hardenbergh	1905–07	Beaux-Arts	
82	Sofitel Chicago Water Tower	Chicago	IL	Jean-Paul Viguier	2002	Postmodern	
83	Glessner House	Chicago	IL	Henry Hobson Richardson	1886–87	Richardsonian Romanesque	
84	Yankee Stadium (1923) (demolished)	New York	NY	Osborn Architects & Engineers	1922–23	Jewel Box Stadium	
85	Harold Washington Library	Chicago	IL	Hammond, Beeby and Babka	1988–91	Postmodern / Neotraditional	
86	Lincoln Center	New York	NY	Wallace Harrison, Philip Johnson and others	1955–69	Modern	
87	The Dakota Apartments	New York	NY	Henry Janeway Hardenbergh	1880–84	Neo-Renaissance	
88	Art Institute of Chicago	Chicago	IL	Shepley, Rutan and Coolidge	1893	Beaux-Arts	
89	Fairmont Hotel	San Francisco	CA	Reid & Reid	1907	Beaux-Arts	
90	Boston Public Library	Boston	MA	Charles Follen McKim	1887–95	Renaissance Revival	
91	Hollywood Bowl	Los Angeles	CA	Lloyd Wright	1929; 2004	Expressionist	
92	Texas State Capitol	Austin	TX	Elijah E. Myers	1885–88	Neo-Renaissance	
93	Fontainebleau	Miami Beach	FL	Morris Lapidus	1954	Modern	
94	Legal Research Building, University of Michigan	Ann Arbor	MI	York and Sawyer	1924–33	Gothic Revival	
95	Getty Center	Los Angeles	CA	Richard Meier	1989–97	Modern	
96	High Museum	Atlanta	GA	Richard Meier	1980–83	Modern	
97	Federal Building and United States Courthouse	Central Islip	NY	Richard Meier	1996–2000	Modern	
98	Humana Building	Louisville	KY	Michael Graves	1982–85	Postmodern	
99	Disney Concert Hall	Los Angeles	CA	Frank Gehry	1999–2003	Postmodern / Deconstructivism	
100	Radio City Music Hall	New York	NY	Edward Durell Stone	1931–32	Art Deco	
101	Paul Brown Stadium	Cincinnati	OH	NBBJ	1998–2000	Postmodern	
102	United Airlines Terminal 1, O'Hare Airport	Chicago	IL	Helmut Jahn	1985–87	Postmodern	
103	Hyatt Regency Atlanta	Atlanta	GA	John C. Portman Jr.	1967	Modern	
104	Oracle Park	San Francisco	CA	Populous	1997–2000	Retro-classical / Neotraditional	
105	Time Warner Center	New York	NY	David Childs	2000–03	Modern	
106	Washington Metro	Washington	DC	Harry Weese	1969–76	Brutalist	
107	IDS Center (IDS Tower)	Minneapolis	MN	Philip Johnson	1969–72	Modern	
108	Seattle Central Library	Seattle	WA	Rem Koolhaas and Joshua Prince-Ramus	2002–04	Structural Expressionist / Deconstructivism	
109	San Francisco Museum of Modern Art	San Francisco	CA	Mario Botta	1992–95	Postmodern	
110	Chicago Union Station	Chicago	IL	Daniel Burnham and Graham, Anderson, Probst and White	1913–25	Art Deco	
111	United Nations Headquarters	New York	NY	Wallace Harrison and others	1948–52	Modern	
112	National Building Museum	Washington	DC	Montgomery C. Meigs	1882–87	Renaissance Revival	
113	Fenway Park	Boston	MA	James E. McLaughlin	1911–12	Jewel box ballpark	
114	Dana–Thomas House	Springfield	IL	Frank Lloyd Wright	1902–04	Prairie School	
115	TWA Flight Center, JFK Airport	New York	NY	Eero Saarinen	1959–62	Modern / Expressionist	
116	The Athenaeum	New Harmony	IN	Richard Meier	1979	Modern	
117	Walker Art Center	Minneapolis	MN	Edward Larrabee Barnes; Herzog & de Meuron	1969–71; 2005	Minimalist	
118	American Airlines Center	Dallas	TX	David M. Schwarz	1991–2001	Neotraditional	
119	Arizona Biltmore Resort and Spa	Phoenix	AZ	Albert Chase McArthur with Frank Lloyd Wright consulting	1929	Art Deco	
120	Richard J. Riordan Central Library	Los Angeles	CA	Bertram Grosvenor Goodhue	1926	Art Deco, Mexican Baroque	
121	San Francisco International Airport	San Francisco	CA	Skidmore, Owings and Merrill, Del Campo and Maru Architects, Michael Willis Architects	1995–2000	Modern	
122	Camden Yards	Baltimore	MD	Hellmuth, Obata + Kassabaum	1989–92	Retro-classical / Neotraditional	
123	Taliesin West	Scottsdale	AZ	Frank Lloyd Wright	1937	Modern	
124	United States Holocaust Museum	Washington	DC	James Ingo Freed, Pei Cobb Freed & Partners	1988–93	Neotraditional, Georgian, modern	
125	Citicorp Center	New York	NY	Hugh Stubbins & Associates; Emery Roth & Sons	1974–77	Postmodern	
126	V. C. Morris Gift Shop	San Francisco	CA	Frank Lloyd Wright	1948	Organic	
127	Union Station	Kansas City	MO	Jarvis Hunt	1914	Beaux-Arts architecture	
128	Rookery Building	Chicago	IL	Burnham and Root	1888	Chicago school	
129	Frederick R. Weisman Museum of Art	Minneapolis	MN	Frank Gehry	1993	Postmodern / Deconstructivism	
130	Douglas House	Harbor Springs	MI	Richard Meier	1965–67	Modern	
131	Aline Barnsdall Hollyhock House	Los Angeles	CA	Frank Lloyd Wright	1919–21	Mayan Revival	
132	Pennzoil Place	Houston	TX	Philip Johnson	1976	Postmodern	
133	Royalton Hotel	New York	NY	Rossiter & Wright; Philippe Starck	1898; 1988	Neoclassical	
134	Astrodome	Houston	TX	Hermon Lloyd & W. B. Morgan, and Wilson, Morris, Crain and Anderson	1962–65	Postmodern	
135	T-Mobile Park	Seattle	WA		1997–99	Retro-modern	
136	Corning Museum of Glass	Corning	NY	Gunnar Birkerts	1976–1980	Modern	
137	30th Street Station	Philadelphia	PA	Graham, Anderson, Probst and White	1927–33	Neoclassical	
138	Robie House	Chicago	IL	Frank Lloyd Wright	1909–10	Prairie School	
139	Williams (formerly Transco) Tower	Houston	TX	Philip Johnson	1981–83	Postmodern	
140	Stahl House (Case Study House #22)	Los Angeles	CA	Pierre Koenig	1959–60	Mid-century modern	
141	Apple, SoHo	New York	NY	Bohlin Cywinski Jackson	2002	Modern	
142	John Hancock Tower	Boston	MA	Henry N. Cobb	1968–76	Minimalist	
143	Pennsylvania Station (demolished)	New York	NY	McKim, Mead & White	1904–10	Neoclassical	
144	Hyatt Regency	San Francisco	CA	John Portman	1973	Postmodern	
145	Carson, Pirie, Scott and Company Building	Chicago	IL	Louis Sullivan	1899	Chicago school	
146	Museum of Modern Art	New York	NY	Philip Johnson	1939	International Style	
147	Auditorium Building	Chicago	IL	Dankmar Adler and Louis Sullivan	1887–89	Chicago school	
148	Brown Palace Hotel	Denver	CO	Frank Edbrooke	1892	Renaissance Revival	
149	Ingalls Rink, Yale University	New Haven	CT	Eero Saarinen	1953–58	Modern	
150	Battle Hall, UT Austin	Austin	TX	Cass Gilbert	1911	Spanish-Mediterranean Revival	

== Criticisms ==
The list reflects popular sentiment as measured by an opinion survey, and thus diverges from the judgment of architecture critics. Urban design critic John King of the San Francisco Chronicle described the list as "the architectural equivalent of comfort food." King noted that the public's ratings were based on seeing a single photo of each building, and pointed out that "There's more to architecture than a picture can convey." Architect and past AIA president R. K. Stewart acknowledges that the list "isn't necessarily the design professional's view of the best buildings, but the emotional connection to where people live and work and play." Buildings named by architects and critics as highly significant, but that did not achieve top 150 ranking in the public survey, included the Salk Institute in La Jolla, California, designed by Louis Kahn; the Inland Steel and John Hancock buildings in Chicago; Dulles International Airport Main Terminal in Chantilly, Virginia, designed by Eero Saarinen; and the Seagram Building in New York City, designed by Ludwig Mies van der Rohe.

== Structures ranked below the top 150 ==
The 98 buildings that were listed by architects as significant, but did not rank in the top 150 in the public vote, were:

- 860–880 Lake Shore Drive Apartments – Chicago, Illinois
- American Folk Art Museum – New York City
- Art & Architecture Building – Yale University, New Haven, Connecticut
- Baker House – Massachusetts Institute of Technology, Cambridge, Massachusetts
- Beinecke Rare Book Library – Yale University, New Haven, Connecticut
- Beth Sholom Synagogue – Elkins Park, Pennsylvania
- Boston City Hall – Boston, Massachusetts
- Bradbury Building – Los Angeles, California
- Burton Barr Library – Phoenix Public Library, Phoenix, Arizona
- Carpenter Center for the Visual Arts – Harvard University, Cambridge, Massachusetts
- Cathedral of Our Lady of the Angels – Los Angeles
- Cathedral of Saint Mary of the Assumption – San Francisco
- CBS Headquarters/ Black Rock – New York City
- Yale Center for British Art/Museum of British Art – Yale University, New Haven, Connecticut
- Chapel/W15 – Massachusetts Institute of Technology, Cambridge, Massachusetts
- Chapel of St. Ignatius – Seattle University, Seattle
- Crown Hall – Illinois Institute of Technology (IIT), Chicago
- Dallas City Hall – Dallas, Texas
- Dallas/Fort Worth International Airport – Dallas, Texas
- M. H. de Young Memorial Museum – San Francisco
- Denver Art Museum – Denver, Colorado
- Denver Public Library – Denver, Colorado
- Eames House – Pacific Palisades, California
- Ennis House/Ennis-Brown House – Los Angeles
- Esherick House – Chestnut Hill, Pennsylvania
- Experience Music Project – Seattle
- Farnsworth House – Plano, Illinois
- First Christian Church – Columbus, Indiana
- First Church of Christ Scientist – Berkeley, California
- First Unitarian Church of Rochester – Rochester, New York
- Ford Foundation Building – New York City
- Frank Gehry Residence – Santa Monica, California
- Freer Gallery of Art – Washington, DC
- Genzyme Center – Cambridge, Massachusetts
- Gropius House – Lincoln, Massachusetts
- Guaranty Building – Buffalo, New York
- Horton Plaza – San Diego
- IBM Building – Chicago
- Inland Steel Building – Chicago
- Jacobs Field – Cleveland, Ohio
- John Deere World Headquarters – Moline, Illinois
- John Hancock Center – Chicago
- Johnson Wax Building – Racine, Wisconsin
- Kaufmann Desert House – Palm Springs, California
- Kimbell Art Museum – Fort Worth, Texas
- Kings Road House – West Hollywood, California
- Larkin Administration Building – Buffalo, New York
- Lever House – New York City
- Lovell Beach House – Newport Beach, California
- R. H. Macy and Co. Store – New York City
- Marin County Civic Center – San Rafael, California
- Marshall Field and Company Building – Chicago
- Menil Collection – Houston, Texas
- Minneapolis Central Library – Minneapolis
- Modern Art Museum of Fort Worth – Fort Worth, Texas
- Monadnock Building – Chicago
- Morgan Library & Museum – New York City
- Mount Angel Library – Mount Angel, Oregon
- Museum of Contemporary Art, Los Angeles
- Museum of Fine Arts, Houston
- Nasher Sculpture Center – Dallas
- National Gallery of Art (East Wing) – Washington, DC
- North Christian Church – Columbus, Indiana
- Oakland Museum of California – Oakland, California
- O'Hare International Airport – Chicago
- Peabody Terrace – Harvard University, Cambridge, Massachusetts
- Petco Park (San Diego Padres) – San Diego
- Philadelphia Savings Fund Society Building/PSFS – Philadelphia
- Philip Johnson's Glass House – New Canaan, Connecticut
- Prada – Los Angeles
- Prada – 575 Broadway, New York City
- Price Tower – Bartlesville, Oklahoma
- Rachofsky House – Dallas, Texas
- REI Flagship Store, Seattle
- Reliance Building – Chicago
- Richards Medical Research Laboratories – Philadelphia
- Ronald Reagan Washington National Airport – Arlington, Virginia
- Rosenthal Center for Contemporary Art – Cincinnati
- Salk Institute – La Jolla, California
- San Francisco Public Library – San Francisco
- Sandra Day O'Connor United States Courthouse – Phoenix, Arizona
- Seagram's Building – New York City
- Frederick J. Smith House – Darien, Connecticut
- Soldier Field – Chicago
- Sony Plaza (AT&T Corporate Headquarters) – New York City
- Staples Center – Los Angeles
- Superdome – New Orleans
- Tiffany and Company Building – New York City
- Unity Temple – Oak Park, Illinois
- University of Phoenix Stadium (Arizona Cardinals Stadium) – Glendale, Arizona
- Vanna Venturi House – Chestnut Hill, Pennsylvania
- Wainwright Building – St. Louis, Missouri
- Washington Dulles International Airport Main Terminal – Chantilly, Virginia
- Wexner Center for the Arts – Ohio State University – Columbus, Ohio
- Whitney Museum – New York City
- William J. Clinton Presidential Library – Little Rock, Arkansas

== See also ==
- Architecture of the United States
