= Viguier =

Viguier may refer to:

== People ==
- Jean-Paul Viguier (born 1946), French architect
- René Viguier (1880–1931), botanist
- Sabrina Viguier (born 1981), French footballer

== Government ==
- The judge in charge of a Viguerie, a French lower court before the Revolution
- Title of the representative of French Co-Prince of Andorra until 1993 (the representative of the Episcopal Co-Prince was titled as Veguer)
