= Sofitel =

French international luxury hotels chain

Sofitel Hotels & Resorts
- Company type: Subsidiary
- Industry: Hotels
- Founded: 26 June 1964; 61 years ago
- Headquarters: Paris, France
- Number of locations: 130 (2023)
- Area served: Worldwide
- Parent: Accor
- Website: sofitel.accor.com

Sofitel Hotels & Resorts is a French hotel chain of luxury hotels based in Paris, France, and owned by Accor since 1980. Founded in 1964 in France, Sofitel quickly developed worldwide to reach more than 200 properties. In 2008, Sofitel became a brand of luxury hotels only, downsized its property count to 89, and created new brands. Sofitel had 130 properties by January 2023.

== History ==
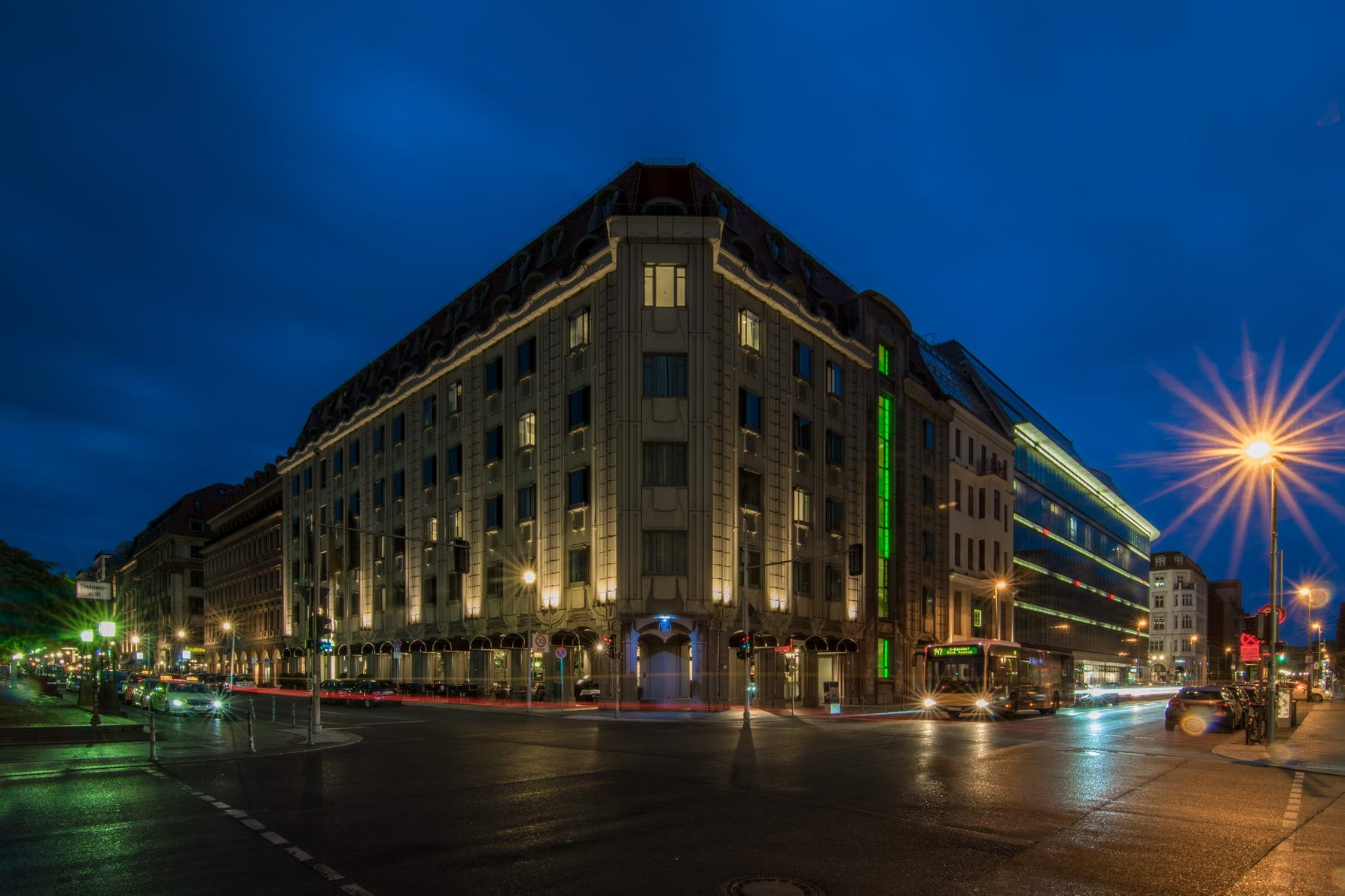
Sofitel in Berlin

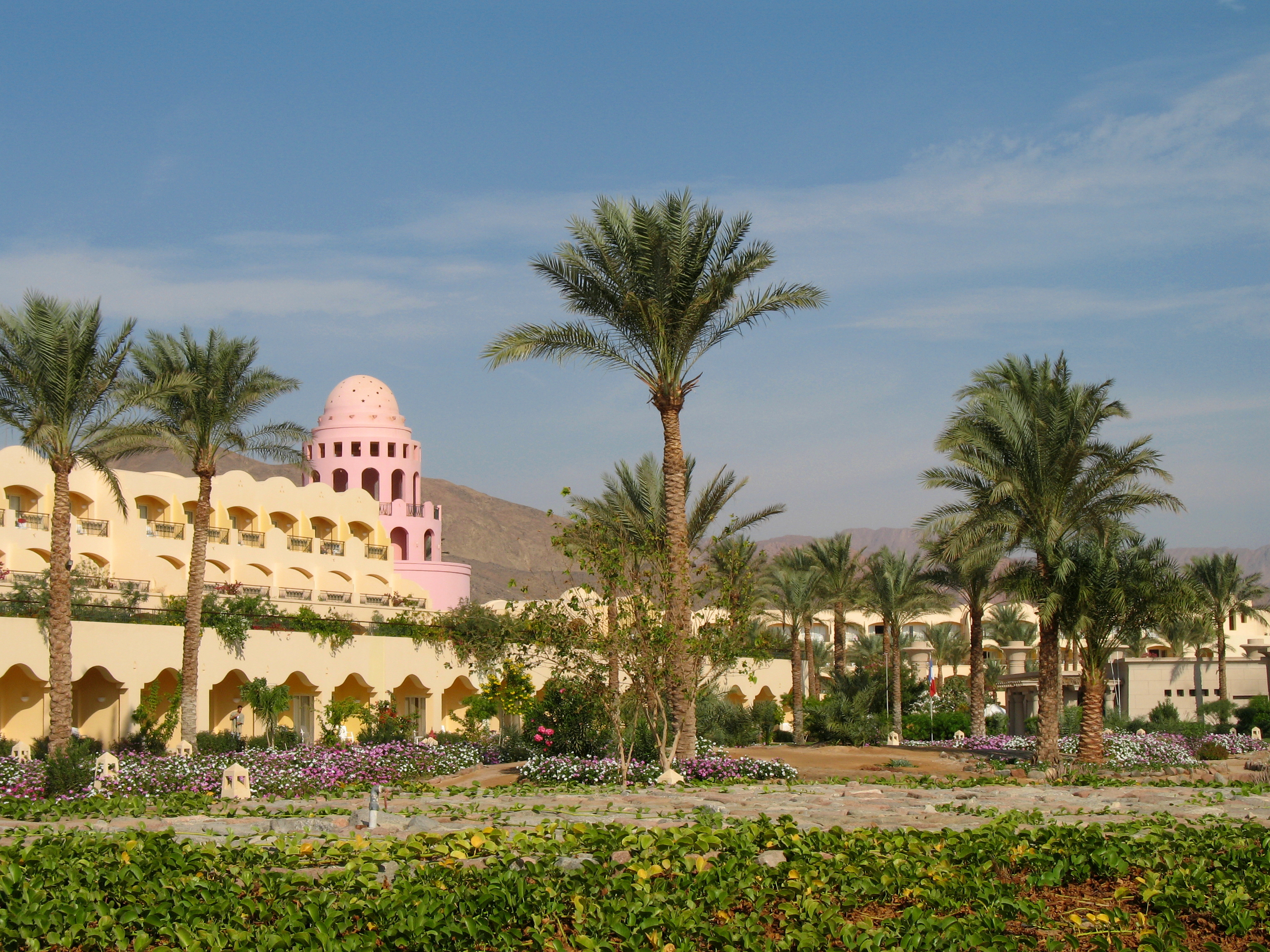
Sofitel in Taba, Egypt

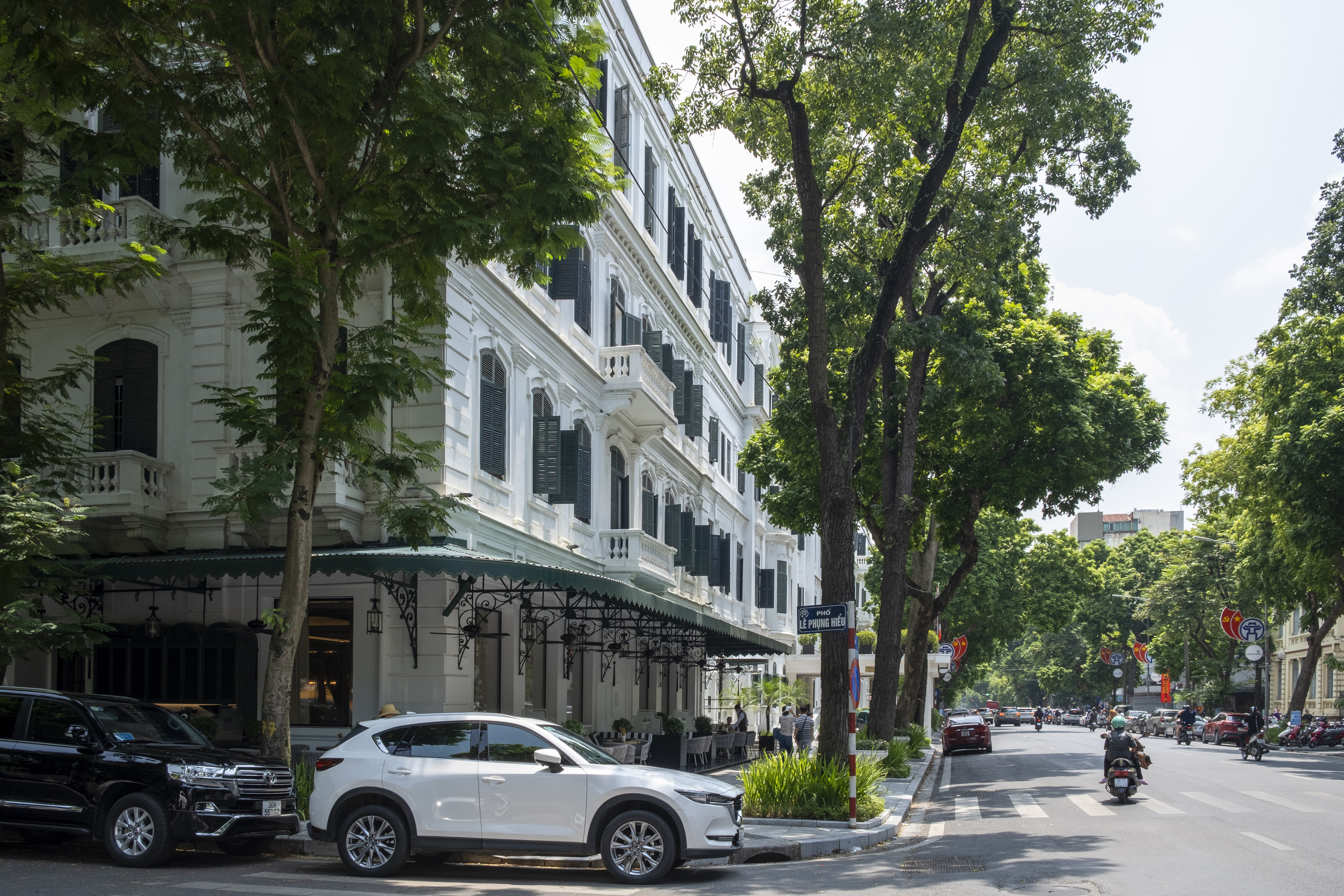
Sofitel Legend Metropole Hanoi

Banque Paribas opened the first Sofitel in Strasbourg (France) on 26 June 1964, the Sofitel Strasbourg Grande Île, which was the first 5-star hotel in the city.

=== International development ===
In the 1970s, Sofitel became an international chain of hotels. The first Sofitel in the United States opened in 1975 in Minneapolis, Minnesota. Sofitel entered the US market with a French approach to hospitality, making French baguettes on site, offering a wide selection of wines, providing bidets in 1/3 of the rooms, and hiring French chefs to manage the kitchens. The hotel turned a profit within 18 months of operations.

In 1980, Sofitel was purchased by Novotel SIEH (renamed Accor in 1983), and joined the group's hotel brands: Novotel, Mercure, Ibis.

The first Sofitel in Colombia opened in 1995, and the first Sofitel in Japan opened in 1996. In 1997, the group announced the opening of the Sofitel New York Hotel, a $90 million investment on West 44th Street between Fifth Avenue and Avenue of the Americas (next to the New York Yacht Club).

In the early 2000s, Sofitel went through a major expansion plan in Asia, targeting beach resorts in Thailand, China and Indonesia. Sofitel also opened the Sofitel Tokyo, the Sofitel St James London, Sofitel Chicago Water Tower, Sofitel Lafayette Square Washington D.C., Sofitel Marrakech, Sofitel Silom Bangkok, Sofitel Montréal and Sofitel Buenos Aires. Between 2003 and 2004, Sofitel opened 14 locations, including the Sofitel Mexico City, its first hotel in Mexico, and 7 new locations in Asia. By 2010, Sofitel had more than 20 properties in China.

=== Luxury and asset-light strategy ===
In 2005, Accor North America decided to apply a joint-venture model on the ownership of 6 of its 11 North-American Sofitel properties to develop new growth opportunities. Then in 2007, the brand underwent a global overhaul. The number of hotels was reduced by 50% and a high-end offer around the Sofitel brand inspired by the French Art de vivre was developed. Sofitel adopted an asset-light strategy (less ownership in properties) to bring more focus on hotel management and related services.

Between 2009 and 2012, 30 new properties were added to Sofitel's portfolio, reaching 120 properties in 2012: The Hotel Carrasco in Montevideo, its first hotel in Uruguay, and the Sofitel Legend Metropole Hanoi in Vietnam. The 182-room Sofitel Vienna Stephansdom designed by French architect Jean Nouvel (2010); The Grand Amsterdam (2011). By 2013, Sofitel managed 8 properties in the Middle East with plans for further expansion. The Dubai Downtown opened in 2014, and Sofitel Jeddah in 2015. The Sofitel Dubai The Palm Resort & Spa and the Sofitel Bali Nusa Dua Beach Resort both opened in 2013 with plans to further develop Sofitel's network of resorts in the Middle East and Africa. In June 2017, Sofitel announced the construction of its highest property so far in the Middle East, the Sofitel Dubai Wafi.

Sofitel worked with fashion designers to create the So Sofitel artsy hotels: Kenzo Takada for the Sofitel So Mauritius, Christian Lacroix for the Sofitel So Bangkok, Karl Lagerfeld for the Sofitel So Singapore, and Polpat Asavaprapha for the Sofitel So Hua Hin.

=== Other Sofitel products ===
In July 2009, Sofitel launched the “So SPA by Sofitel” concept at the Saint James Hotel in London and at the Sofitel Marseille Vieux Port location. So SPA's development in Asia started in 2013.

In December 2014, during the Marrakech International Film Festival, Sofitel launched the first edition of La Nuit by Sofitel, recurring parties organized by Sofitel and happening around noteworthy fashionable events worldwide.

== Notable properties ==
This is a non-exhaustive list of notable Sofitel Hotels & Resorts properties:

- Sofitel Dubai The Obelisk
- Sofitel Frankfurt Opera
- Sofitel Legend Metropole Hanoi

=== 4-star notable hotels ===
- Sofitel Chicago Magnificent Mile
- Sofitel New York Hotel

=== Notable defunct properties ===
- Sofitel Philippine Plaza Manila

== Sustainable development ==
As a member of the AccorHotels group, Sofitel Hotels & Resorts applies the sustainable development policies set by the group. In April 2016, AccorHotels announced that a 1,000 of its hotels, including Sofitel properties, now needed to weigh and record all thrown away foods to reduce food waste. The number of items on menus shrank to 10-20 and those courses must use seasonal local products as much as possible. The group also planned the opening of 1,000 vegetable gardens within its properties, including Sofitel properties, by 2020. In Etterbeek, the honey served by Sofitel is produced on the building's roof by a professional beekeeper.
