= Sofitel New York Hotel =

Luxury hotel in Manhattan, New York

Sofitel New York
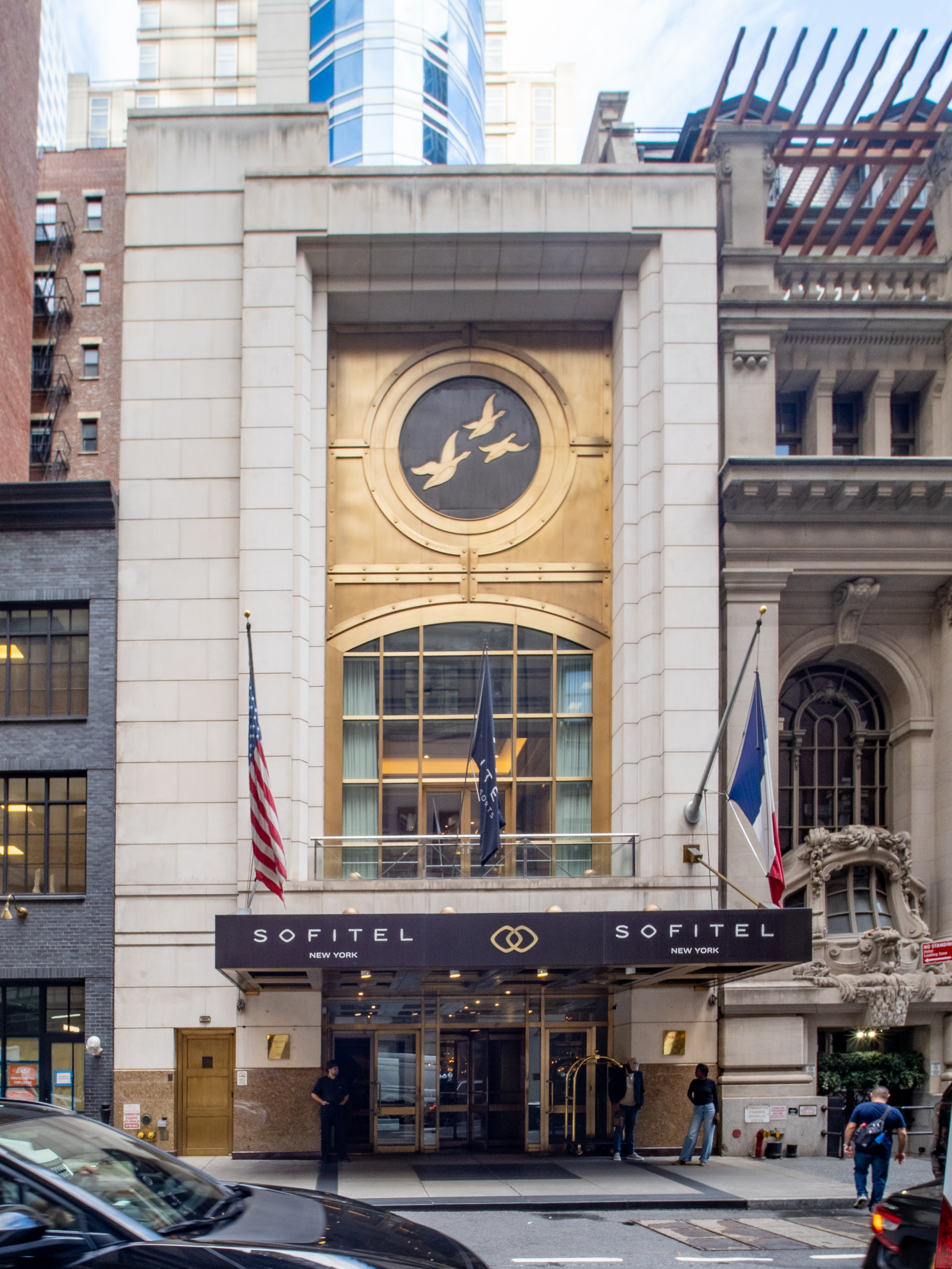

General information
- Location: 45 West 44th Street, New York City, United States
- Coordinates: 40°45′20″N 73°58′53″W
- Construction started: 1997
- Completed: 2000
- Owner: Sofitel corporation

Height
- Height: 109 m (358 ft)

Technical details
- Floor count: 30

Design and construction
- Architect: Brennan Beer Gorman
- Structural engineer: DeSimone Consulting Engineers
- Awards: 2000 Emporis Skyscraper Award

Website
- www.sofitel.com

Sofitel New York is a boutique hotel on West 44th Street in Midtown Manhattan in New York City, owned and managed by the Sofitel corporation. It is two blocks north of Bryant Park and the New York Public Library Main Branch and next to the New York Yacht Club Building. The hotel is inspired by French traditions in furnishings and theme, and the hotel staff are bilingual in French and English. Completed in 2000, the limestone and glass building is 358 feet (109 m) tall with 30 stories and 398 guest rooms. In November 2025, the hotel completed a comprehensive top-to-bottom renovation of its public spaces, meeting rooms and guest accommodations.

== History ==
Construction on the hotel began in 1997, and it opened in 2000. The International Monetary Fund (IMF) was reportedly responsible for funding the project after a design by Brennan Beer Gorman was chosen in an architectural competition which included entries from architects such as Michael Graves & Associates. After construction the building was awarded the 2000 Emporis Skyscraper Award.

== Architecture ==
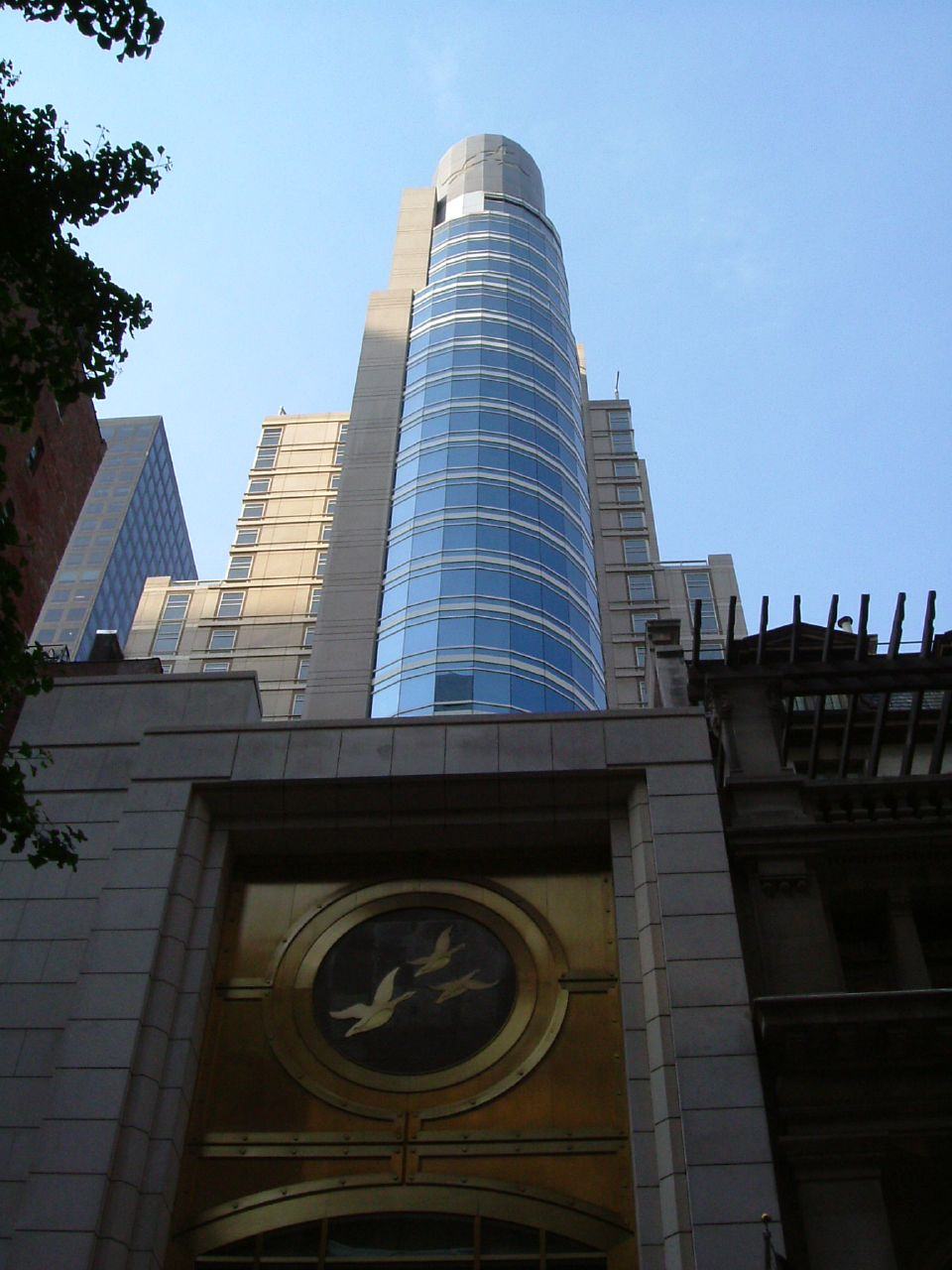

The hotel is 358 feet (109 m) tall with 30 floors and has 398 luxury guest rooms including 52 suites. The architectural design by Brennan Beer Gorman features limestone and glass, with a T-shaped base. The facade was architecturally inspired by Parisian Moderne limestone buildings. The facade is bronze and depicts three flying geese above in a large portal. DeSimone Consulting Engineers were the structural engineers for the building.
