= Gaston Hall =

Auditorium at Georgetown University

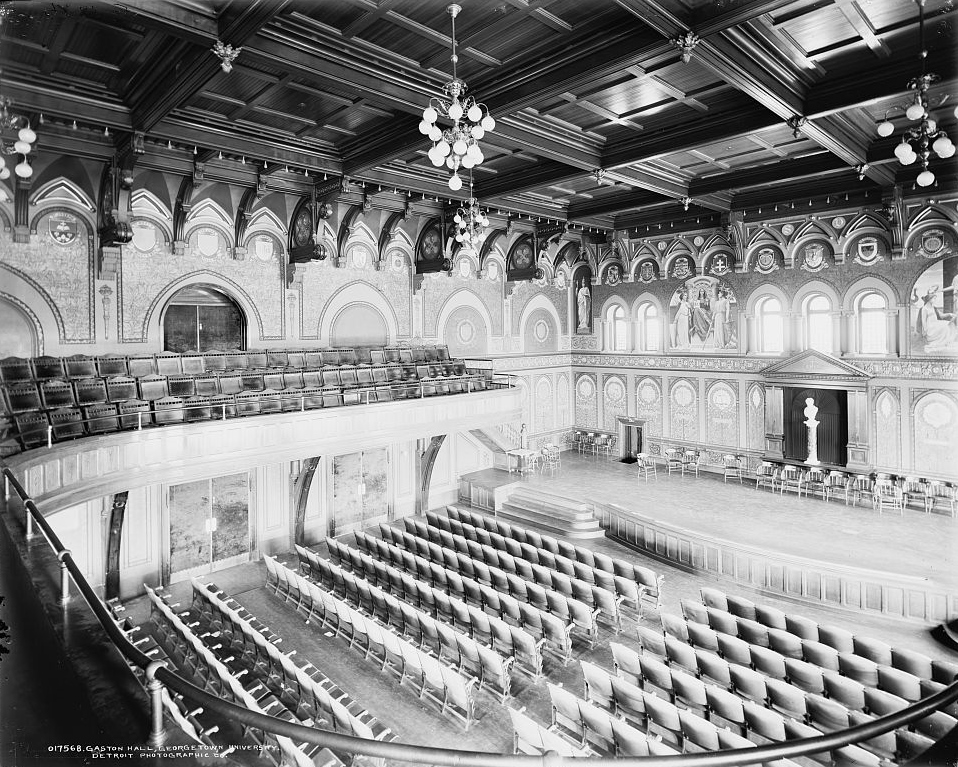
- Gaston Hall ca. 1904
- Interactive map of the Gaston Hall area

General information
- Location: Healy Hall, Georgetown University, Washington, D.C.
- Named for: William Gaston
- Completed: 1901

Other information
- Seating capacity: 740

Gaston Hall is an auditorium located on the third and fourth floors of the north tower of Healy Hall on Georgetown University's main campus in Washington, D.C. Named for Georgetown's first student, William Gaston, who also helped secure the university's federal charter, Gaston Hall was completed in 1901, around twenty years after the construction of the building within which it is housed.

The 740-seat hall (including orchestra and balcony) is today used for numerous occasions including convocations and honorary degree ceremonies, theatrical and musical performances, and speeches. Gaston Hall has gained a reputation for hosting prominent heads of state, political leaders, and other public figures.

== Architecture ==
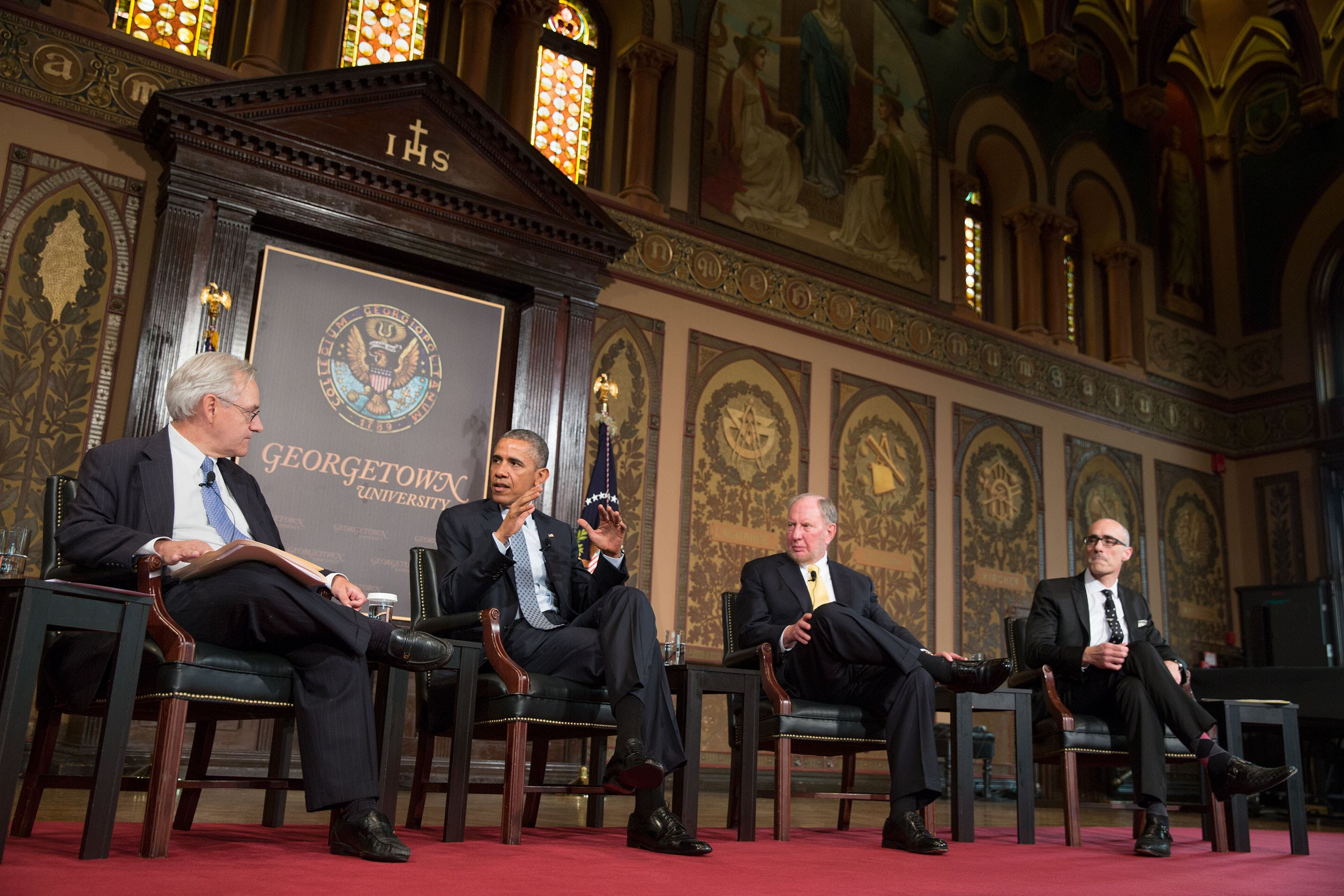
Gaston Hall stage with President Obama and others in 2015

Gaston Hall is often referred to as the "jewel in the crown" of Georgetown's campus due to its ornate interior and grand adornments. The ceiling line bears the coats of arms of the sixty Jesuit universities in the world at the time of Gaston's construction, all beneath a decorated wood ceiling. In addition, a number of classical allegorical scenes that fill the walls were painted freehand (without a stencil) by Francis Schroen, a Jesuit Brother who was a reputed interior designer and painter of Catholic institutions and several other rooms within Healy Hall. Behind the stage are paintings of Athena, goddess of wisdom, and a "classically draped male." He painted two large murals above the stage, the left symbolically depicting Morality, Faith, and Patriotism, and the right depicting Art, Alma Mater, and Science.

The center of the stage contains a wooden decorative structure that displays the Georgetown University seal and an IHS Christogram. This Christogram was the center of some controversy when it was covered by a piece of black plywood at the request of the White House for a speech by President Obama on the stage of Gaston Hall.

== Hosted speakers ==
Due to its significant place in Georgetown's history, Gaston Hall has hosted numerous prominent individuals to speak. In addition to university events such as the Philodemic Society's Merrick Debate and the South Asian cultural show Rangila, in recent times, Gaston Hall has been host to (among others):

Politics and government:

- President of the United States Barack Obama
- Prime Minister of the United Kingdom Tony Blair
- President of the United States Bill Clinton
- Prime Minister of Italy Matteo Renzi
- President of Afghanistan Hamid Karzai
- Prime Minister of Malaysia Najib Razak
- President of Kosovo Atifete Jahjaga
- Speaker of the House Newt Gingrich
- Speaker of the House Paul Ryan
- Supreme Court Justice Stephen Breyer
- Representative Ron Paul
- Secretary of State Hillary Clinton
- Secretary of State John Kerry
- Secretary of State Madeleine Albright
- Secretary of Defense Ashton Carter
- Attorney General Loretta Lynch
- Secretary of the Treasury Jack Lew
- Secretary of Health and Human Services Sylvia Mathews Burwell
- Secretary of the Interior Sally Jewell
- National Security Advisor Susan Rice
- IMF Director Christine Lagarde
- World Bank President Jim Yong Kim
- WHO Director-General Margaret Chan
- UN High Commissioner for Refugees António Guterres (before becoming UN Secretary-General)
- First Lady Laura Bush
- Senator Bernie Sanders
- Senator Elizabeth Warren

Public life:

- Archbishop of Washington Cardinal Donald Wuerl
- Ecumenical Patriarch Bartholomew I
- Charles, Prince of Wales
- Actor Kevin Spacey
- Musician Bono
- Comedian Jon Stewart
- Businessman Warren Buffett
- Actor Bradley Cooper
- Entrepreneur Mark Zuckerberg
- Comedian John Mulaney
- Comedian Pee Wee Herman
- Actor and activist Jesse Adam Eisenberg
- Physician-scientist and immunologist Anthony Stephen Fauci

== See also ==
- List of Georgetown University buildings
