= Olive Cowell =

Professor and art patron (b. 1887, d. 1984)

Olive Thompson Cowell (1887–1984) was a patron of the arts and music, and a professor of International Relations.

== Career ==
Cowell graduated from Barnard College in 1910. She taught in high schools for several years before becoming professor at San Francisco State University. She went on to found the International Relations department as part of the Government program at San Francisco State University in 1927, the first International Relations department in the USA. She taught at the university until 1956.

== Life ==
Cowell was the step-mother of pianist and composer Henry Cowell. Henry was born when the family lived in Menlo Park. Olive schooled Henry at home. She was the third wife of Henry Clayton Blackwood Cowell, known as Harry Cowell, and they were married from 1866 to 1954.

Cowell was a member of the Temple of the People, an offshoot of the Theosophical Society. Henry Cowell was also influenced by Theosophy. As a teen he met the Irish Theosophist poet John Varian, and set some of his poetry to music.

== Involvement in New Music Society ==
Cowell commissioned the Cowell House from architect Gertrude Comfort Morrow, a residence in San Francisco with a large living room to accommodate her son's recitals. Irving Morrow, husband of Gertrude Comfort Morrow, was interested in music and played percussion with Lou Harrison and John Cage. Olive and Henry Cowell moved into the house in 1933. It is considered the first modern residential building in San Francisco, located at 171 San Marcos Avenue.

The house became Henry Cowell's 'headquarters' in San Francisco, and a gathering place for composers including Lou Harrison, Edgar Varese, and Arnold Schonberg. Cowell supported her son's projects including New Music Quarterly, a publication, and the New Music Society, which hosted concerts. Archival materials suggest that she also knew architect Lillian Bridgman.
