= Sofitel Chicago Magnificent Mile =

Hotel in Chicago, Illinois

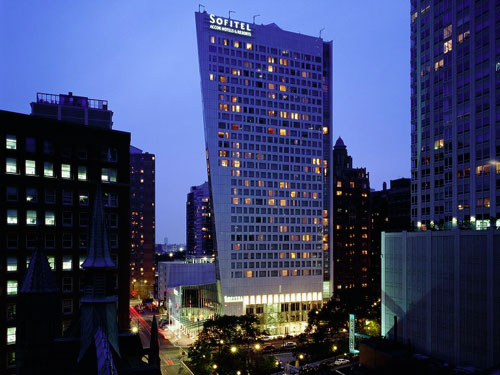

- Location in Downtown Chicago Sofitel Chicago Magnificent Mile (Illinois) Sofitel Chicago Magnificent Mile (the United States)
- Former names: Sofitel Chicago Water Tower

General information
- Location: 20 East Chestnut Street , Chicago, Illinois
- Coordinates: 41°53′54.3″N 87°37′39.4″W
- Opening: 2002
- Operator: Sofitel

Height
- Height: 347 ft (106 m)

Technical details
- Floor count: 33
- Floor area: 375,000 sq ft (35,000 sq m)

Design and construction
- Architect: Jean-Paul Viguier

Other information
- Number of rooms: 415
- Number of suites: 63

The Sofitel Chicago Magnificent Mile, formerly named the Sofitel Chicago Water Tower, is a hotel in Gold Coast neighborhood of Chicago, Illinois. It is operated by the Sofitel hotel chain. The hotel was designed by French architect Jean-Paul Viguier.

The hotel opened in May 2002 with 415 rooms and upon opening was noted for its French-style architecture. It has a unique knifelike edge on the southern end which extends 33 feet over the sidewalk. Its design has garnered the American Institute of Architects honor of being on its America's Favorite Architecture list.

In 2008, Expedia named the hotel the best in the world based on user reviews.

The hotel's restaurant, CDA, was originally called the Cafe des Architectes.
