= Francis C. Schroen =

Bavarian-American painter

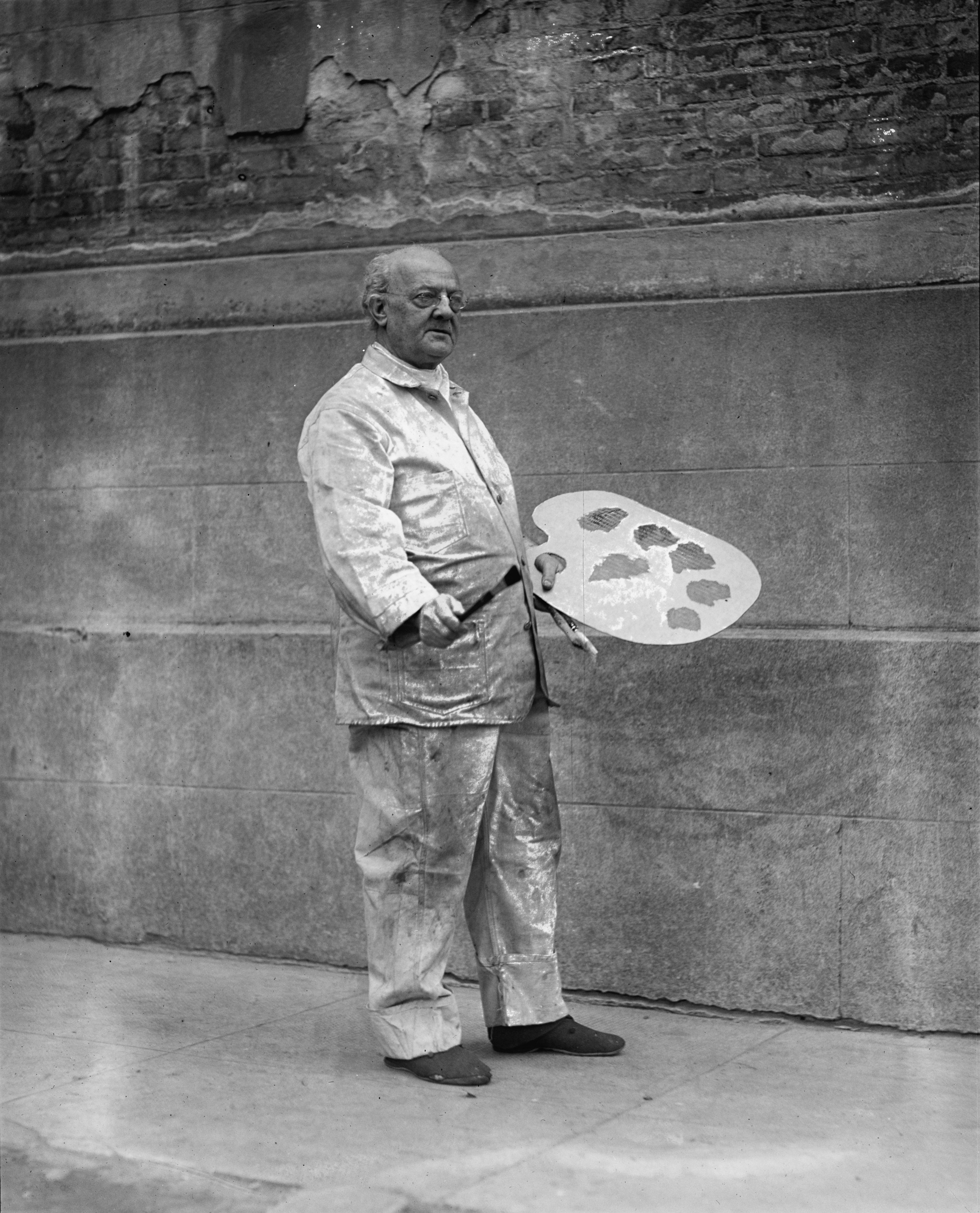
- Born: 1857; Kingdom of Bavaria
- Died: 1924 (aged 66–67)
- Resting place: Jesuit Community Cemetery
- Occupations: Painter and interior designer

Francis C. Schroen, SJ, (1857–1924) was a Jesuit brother, who was an interior designer and painter principally of Roman Catholic institutions.

== Life ==
Born in the Kingdom of Bavaria in 1857, he eventually immigrated to the United States. He designed a number of venues for Georgetown University, including Dahlgren Chapel of the Sacred Heart and parts of Healy Hall, such as Gaston Hall, the Bioethics Library Hirst Reading Room, Carroll Parlor, and the main Parlor Corridor.

Schroen also designed the 1900 chapel of Loyola School in New York, which featured stained glass designed by Louis C. Tiffany and a white marble altar of his own design below a canopied statue of Our Lady of Lourdes, by the New York-sculptor Joseph Sibbel.

Francis Schroen died in 1924 and was buried in Jesuit community cemetery on the campus of Georgetown University.
