= Gertrude Comfort Morrow =

American architect

- Born: February 13, 1888; San Francisco, California
- Died: October 10, 1983 (aged 95); Tucson, Arizona
- Other name: Gertrude E. Comfort
- Education: University of California, Berkeley
- Occupation: architect
- Spouse: Irving Morrow

Gertrude Comfort Morrow (February 13, 1888 – October 10, 1983) was an American architect who frequently collaborated with her husband, Irving Morrow.

== Early life and education ==
Morrow was born Gertrude E. Comfort in San Francisco, California, and attended Alameda High School in the East Bay. She went on to get her B.A. in architecture from the University of California, Berkeley, in 1913 and her master's degree a year later. While still a student, she was "crowned" for her contribution to the design of a poster for the 1913 Partheneia performance, "The Awakening of Everymaid." She also won a competition to design a coat of arms for the Gamma Phi Beta sorority, and her design is still in use by the sorority today.

== Architectural career ==
After leaving the university, Gertrude worked in the office of Henry Gutterson. After she was issued her Architectural License by the state of California in 1916, she opened her own office in 1917 in downtown San Francisco and worked under her maiden name for several years. When her former employer was called into war camp service, he asked Gertrude to handle his duties as the Supervising Architect of St. Francis Wood, which was an emerging residential district. She designed about ten homes in this district, which were traditional in style. During World War I, for example, she was the supervising architect for the development of St. Francis Wood, a middle-class enclave in San Francisco where Ida McCain also built some houses. Other projects of hers include the Women's Athletic Club in Oakland, California, and the music building at the Monrovian Seminary and College for Women in Bethlehem, Pennsylvania.

In 1920, she married architect Irving F. Morrow, after which she used Gertrude Comfort Morrow as her professional name. In 1922 the Morrows' daughter was born, and around this time the couple set up the firm Morrow & Morrow and collaborated on many architectural projects between 1925 and 1940, in both San Francisco and the East Bay. The most famous of the projects they worked on together between 1930 and 1937 was the design of the geometrically stylized Art Deco towers, walkways, railings, and lighting of the Golden Gate Bridge, as well as its famous International Orange paint scheme. Although Irving Morrow is usually given sole credit for these features of the bridge design, the Morrows' daughter stated that her mother had had a hand in it. In addition, there is at least one letter from Irving Morrow discussing Morrow & Morrow's design ideas for the bridge in which the pronouns 'we', 'us', and 'our' are used throughout. Another joint project was the modernist Alameda-Contra Costa County Building for the 1939 Golden Gate International Exposition at Treasure Island. In the early 1930s, the Morrows designed an International Style house in the Forest Hill area for San Francisco State College professor Olive Cowell (stepmother of composer Henry Cowell) that is cited as the first truly modern house in San Francisco. This house was an exception, however, as most of the houses Morrow & Morrow built were more conventional.

Gertrude closed Morrow & Morrow and retired from architecture when Irving died in 1952, turning her efforts in other directions. She became an award-winning ballroom dancer, and she also painted landscapes in watercolor. She died in Tucson, Arizona, at the age of 95. Her papers are part of the Irving F. and Gertrude Comfort Morrow Collection at UC Berkeley, which includes photographs and drawings of her work, together with various other documents and records.

== Partial list of buildings ==
- 171 San Marcos Ave, San Francisco (1933)
- 70 Santa Monica, San Francisco
- 30 San Leandro Way, San Francisco
- 1651 Portola, San Francisco (torn down)

== See also ==
- List of California women architects
