= List of jewel box baseball parks =

Jewel box is a term sometimes used in reference to the group of Major League Baseball ballparks built (or re-built) primarily between 1909 and 1915, after the wooden ballpark era and before the modern multipurpose stadium era. These parks featured two-tier grandstand design to take advantage of the steel structural supports and often squeezed inside a city block bringing fans right on top of the action. The "retro" ballparks constructed in the 1990s (and later) were an attempt to capture, to some degree, the perceived intimacy and baseball focus of these parks.

== Jewel box ballparks by city ==
Here is a list of the jewel box ballparks, their dates of use as a Major League Baseball facility^ (see note below), and some indication of their remnants, if known:

Boston

- Braves Field/National League Park (late 1915–1952) – Right field pavilion and concourse, as well as ticket office, survive as part of Nickerson Field on the campus of Boston University.
- Fenway Park (1912–present) – Still standing and active.

Brooklyn

- Ebbets Field (1913–1957) – Plaque marking its location. Apartment building on site.

Chicago

- White Sox Park/Comiskey Park (mid 1910–1990) – Outline of batters boxes with replica of home plate. Guaranteed Rate Field parking lot on site.
- Weeghman Park/Cubs Park/Wrigley Field (1914–present) – Still standing and active.

Cincinnati

- Redland Field/Crosley Field (1912–mid 1970) – Plaque and some old grandstand chair seats. Office park on site.

Cleveland

- League Park/Dunn Field (1910–1946) – Ticket office, part of grandstand wall, and ballfield. (Remnant of first-base grandstand was razed ca. 2005).

Detroit

- Navin Field/Briggs Stadium/Tiger Stadium (1912–1999) – Abandoned for MLB but stood for nearly nine years. Demolition began summer 2008. After plans for saving the field and the dugout-to-dugout portion of the stands fell through in June 2009, demolition continued, and was completed at the end of the year. The ballfield and outfield flagpole remain in place. It is presently known as the Corner Ballpark.

New York

- Brush Stadium/Polo Grounds (mid 1911–1957, 1962–1963) – Plaque marking its location, along with parts of old stairway down from Speedway. Apartment building on site.
- Yankee Stadium (1923–1973, 1976–2008; significantly altered 1974–1975) – Demolition completed in 2010 for public parkland.

Philadelphia

- National League Park/Baker Bowl (1895–mid 1938) – A Pennsylvania Historical marker stands on Broad Street just north of West Huntingdon Street, Philadelphia. The marker is titled, "Baker Bowl National League Park".
- Shibe Park/Connie Mack Stadium (1909–1970) – Plaque marking location. Church on site.

Pittsburgh

- Forbes Field (mid 1909–mid 1970) – Parts of outfield walls and the flagpole exist at the original site; another part of the outfield wall now stands at the Pirates' current home of PNC Park; and home plate is preserved under lucite in Posvar Hall, a University of Pittsburgh academic building standing on most of the stadium site. (According to a story that circulated in later years, the original location of home plate was in a women's restroom at Posvar Hall, and the preserved home plate was moved so that all visitors could view it. Later research has debunked this story, but did confirm that the preserved home plate had been moved from its original location.)

St. Louis

- Sportsman's Park/Busch Stadium (1909–early 1966) – Ballfield as part of Herbert Hoover Boys' Club on site.

Washington

- National Park/American League Park/Griffith Stadium (1911–1961) – Plaque. Howard University hospital on site.

^Unless otherwise noted, first and last years listed include entire baseball season in that year.

== Night baseball – lights added ==
Jewel box parks were used during the era that saw the Major Leagues begin playing games at night. Below is a list of when each park had lights installed.

Park	Year lights were installed
Crosley Field	1935
Ebbets Field	1938
Connie Mack Stadium	1939
Comiskey Park	1939
Polo Grounds	1940
Sportsman's Park	1940
Forbes Field	1940
Griffith Stadium	1941
Braves Field	1946
Yankee Stadium	1946
Fenway Park	1947
Tiger Stadium	1948
Wrigley Field	1988
Baker Bowl	Never
League Park	Never

The Cleveland Indians also played home games at Cleveland Stadium starting in 1932. They played their first night game at Cleveland Stadium in 1939.

== Sources ==
- Green Cathedrals, by Phil Lowry
- Ballparks of North America, by Michael Benson
- Lost Ballparks, by Lawrence Ritter
- There are also various internet sites that contain photos of the remnants
