= R. K. Stewart =

American architect

RK Stewart (born August 16, 1952) is an American architect based in Salt Lake City, Utah. He is a fellow at the American Institute of Architects, where he was the group's president in 2006–2007 and is also a senior fellow at New Buildings Institute.

== Biography ==
Stewart was born in St. Louis, Missouri on August 16, 1952. He attended Lindbergh High School and graduated in 1970. He attended the University of Kansas and received a Bachelor of Environmental Design degree in 1974. He attended the University of Michigan and received a Master of Architecture degree in 1975. He has taught at University of Utah, Louisiana State University and Mississippi State University. Work experience includes SOM (Chicago and Washington DC), Heller and Leake (San Francisco), Gensler (San Francisco) and Perkins + Will (San Francisco). He has served the American Institute of Architects as president of their San Francisco chapter and California council. In 2007 he served as the national president during the organization's 150th anniversary. He is senior fellow of the Design Futures Council and a New Buildings Institute (NBI) Senior Fellow. Stewart has served on National Institute of Building Sciences Board of Directors, completing his tenure as board chair in 2013.
