= John L. Smithmeyer =

American architect (1832–1908)

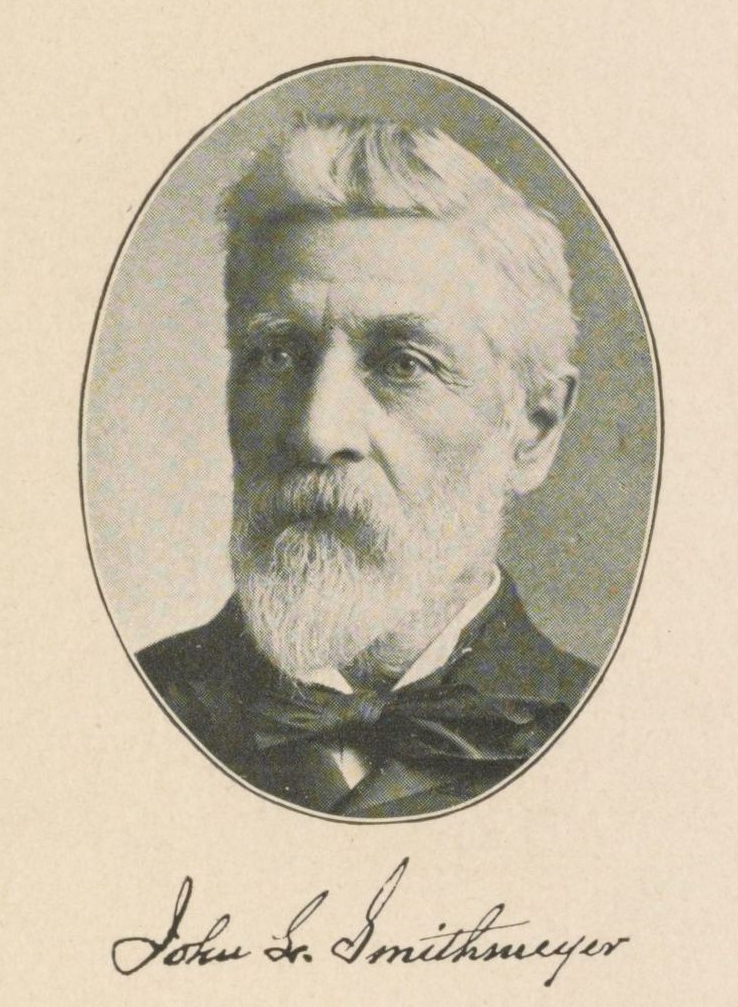
John L. Smithmeyer

John L. Smithmeyer (1832–1908) was an American architect.

== Biography ==
He was born in Vienna, Austria, in 1832 and came to the U.S. in 1848. He studied architecture in Chicago and began an architectural practice in Indianapolis. After serving in the U.S. Civil War in Indiana, he was appointed superintendent of the construction of Government buildings in the South and subsequently moved to Washington, D.C., and partnered with Paul J. Pelz to win the competition for the new building of the Library of Congress (now Thomas Jefferson Building).

Smithmeyer later won other assignments together with Pelz (Healy Hall, Georgetown University; Carnegie Free Library of Allegheny, Pittsburgh) but in 1888 was dismissed from the Library of Congress project following controversy over the award of a cement contract. The partnership ended the same year. Pelz has been attributed the main role in the general design of the building and the execution of its exterior, while Smithmeyer was instrumental in securing the commission. In 1906 Smithmeyer published a History of the Construction of the Library of Congress (1906), in which he defended his role in the project.

In the early 1890s Smithmeyer worked on the construction of the Chamberlain Hotel in Fort Monroe, Virginia, a commission he had won together with Pelz before their separation. The hotel was completed in 1896 but destroyed by fire in 1920 and replaced by the current building.

Smithmeyer died in 1908.
