= Irving Morrow =

American architect

Irving Foster Morrow (September 22, 1884 – October 28, 1952) was an American architect best known for designing the Golden Gate Bridge.

== Early life ==
He was born and raised in Oakland, California, the son of Susie (née Kirkman) and James Alexander Morrow, who was the president of a metal works in Oakland. Morrow was a lifelong resident of the Bay Area.

Morrow graduated from the newly founded University of California, Berkeley architecture program in 1906. He then attended the École nationale supérieure des Beaux-Arts in Paris from 1908 until 1911. He moved back to Oakland and began practicing architecture in San Francisco and Oakland. He designed houses, banks, theatres, hotels, schools, and commercial buildings. He married Gertrude Comfort Morrow, a fellow architect and UC Berkeley graduate. He worked with Gertrude and architect William I. Garren, and with them designed the Alameda-Contra Costa County Building for the 1939 Golden Gate International Exposition. Morrow and his associates also designed the rectory and guest house of the Mission San Juan Bautista.

== Design of the Golden Gate Bridge ==
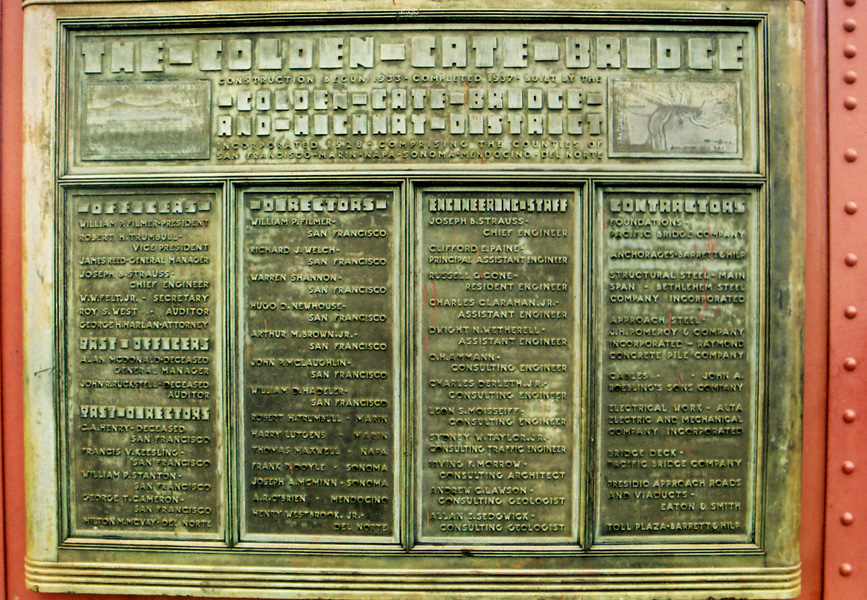
Plaque of the major contributors to the Golden Gate Bridge

Morrow was hired in 1930 by Joseph Strauss to design the Golden Gate Bridge. Morrow collaborated with Strauss with the design, sketching his ideas in charcoal. Morrow romanticized the bridge long before he was hired to work on it, writing in 1919 that "The narrow strait is caressed by breezes from the blue bay throughout the long golden afternoon, but perhaps it is loveliest at the cool end of the day when, for a few breathless moments, faint afterglows transfigure the gray line of hills."

It was also Morrow that decided the bridge should be painted international orange. At first, Morrow's suggestion was deemed by the bridge authorities as ludicrous, as it was thought no paint could withstand the salty weather. Morrow found such a paint, and the bridge authorities relented.

Morrow wrote the Report on Color and Lighting to chief engineer, Joseph B. Strauss, on April 6, 1935. In his report, he selected low pressure sodium vapor lamps with an amber glow and the most modern available in 1937. In 1972, the lights were replaced with high-pressure sodium vapor lamps.

== Other work ==
Morrow was a member of the American Institute of Architects and the American Society of Landscape Architects, an editor of Pacific Coast Architecture, and a contributor to the Architectural Record and various other periodicals. He served as chairman on the Section on Architecture of the Commonwealth Club of California, and director of the American Historical Building Survey.

== Interest in Music ==
Morrow was an avid supporter of new music. He performed in concerts presented by Lou Harrison and John Cage. With his wife, Gertrude Comfort Morrow, he designed the Cowell House, commissioned by Olive Cowell and lived in by her and her son, composer Henry Cowell. The Cowell's hosted many concerts at the house in the 1930s. Morrow also designed a series of soundproof listening rooms for the Record Rental Library.
