= Jean-Paul Viguier =

French architect (born 1946)

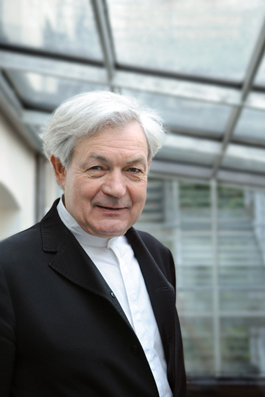
- Viguier in 2009
- Born: 4 May 1946 (age 80); Azas, France
- Occupation: Architect
- Practice: Jean-Paul Viguier SA

Jean-Paul Viguier (born 4 May 1946) is a French architect. He is one of few French architects to work extensively outside of Europe.

== Early works ==
Graduated from the École nationale supérieure des Beaux-Arts in 1970, Jean-Paul Viguier, with Jean Bossu and Georges-Henri Pingusson, founded the teaching unit n°5. 3 years later, he received a "master of city planning in urban design" at the Harvard Graduate School of Design from Harvard University, and, as he came back in France, he hosted a section of urban architecture in the journal Urbanisme. From 1975-1992, projects were carried out in association with Jean-François Jodry. In 1981, he won the "first prize of the jury" in the competition for the Opera Bastille and then, in 1983, the "first tie price" for the project head Defense. In 1986, he won alongside Alain Provost, Patrick Berger and Gilles Clément, the competition for the construction of the Parc André-Citroën in Paris, whose creation will last 6 years (1992-2002) soon after they won the Seville Expo’92 contest for the French Pavilion.

In 1988, he designed The Atrium : headquarters of the Caisse des Depots et Consignations in Boulogne-Billancourt. In 1990, he won the competition organized by the Public Establishment for the development of the Defence area for the construction of the Heart defense complex at the Esso headquarters location. Then he realized the headquarters of France Télévisions in Paris, as well as many others, such as Alstom in Saint-Ouen and AstraZeneca and Bristol-Myers Squibb in Rueil-Malmaison.

== Jean-Paul Viguier et Associés practice ==
The firm has designed housing, cultural, office, and urban-development projects.

In the area of housing, with achievements in Paris (Bercy, Dupleix), Créteil, Asnieres-sur-Seine, Clichy and recently (in 2009) in the ^{15th} district of the capital, rue de la Convention.In the cultural sector, the firm designed the Jean-Falala Médiathèque in Reims and led the restructuring of the Natural History Museum of Toulouse. The firm also designed urban facilities such as the layout of the site of the Pont du Gard and built an archaeological museum on the same site in 2000.

The firm has also designed office buildings, including Angle in Boulogne-Billancourt (2008), the headquarters of L'Équipe, IBM Europe in Bois-Colombes (2009), Prisma Presse in Gennevilliers, and Cœur Méditerranée in Marseille (2008). Finally, the Majunga tower is located in La Défense.

The firm’s international work includes the Hotel Sofitel Water Tower (2002) and planning projects in Malaysia. In spring 2008, in Budapest central square, the Vorosmarty Plaza Project was opened to the public: a mixed-use building with a glass façade. In June 2008, the McNay Museum of Art in San Antonio, the first American modern art museum built by a French architect, was inaugurated. The agency also worked in Morocco at the construction of the headquarters of Morocco Telecom in Rabat in 2009.

According to the firm’s website: “The agency has thus shown an ability to build in various parts of the world and strives to bring to its projects the best possible responses to the relationship between buildings and their environment.”

== Awards and personal titles ==
- Member of the High Commission of Historical Monuments.
- Knight of the Legion of Honour since 15 April 2003 he was promoted to officer of the Legion of Honor on 14 July 2011.
- Commander of the Order of Arts and Letters.
- Knight of the National Order of Merit.

Jean-Paul Viguier was awarded the grand prize of the Cities Monitor for the Parc André-Citroën, got a mention for the prix de l’equerre d’Argent of Architecture for his industrial hotel activity building rue d ' Aubervilliers in Paris^{19th,} and the Architectural Record-Business Week Award in New York for the head office of Astra Pharmaceutical Headquarters in Rueil-Malmaison. The Sofitel Chicago Water Tower has received "the best building since ten years award" in 2003 by the AIA Chicago; This building is listed among the "150 favorite buildings of America" by the American Institute of Architects, and got the MIPIM Award in 2005. The Pont du Gard has the ”Grand site de France " label.

He has been a member of the Académie d’architecture since 1993 and served as its president from 1999 to 2002. He is also a founding member of AFEX (Architectes Français à l’Export). He was appointed "honorary Fellow" of the AIA (American Institute of Architects) in 2001 and Honorary Professor of Tongji University in Shanghai, China.

Several projects by the firm have received environmental certifications such as BREEAM, BBC, HQE.

== Notable works ==
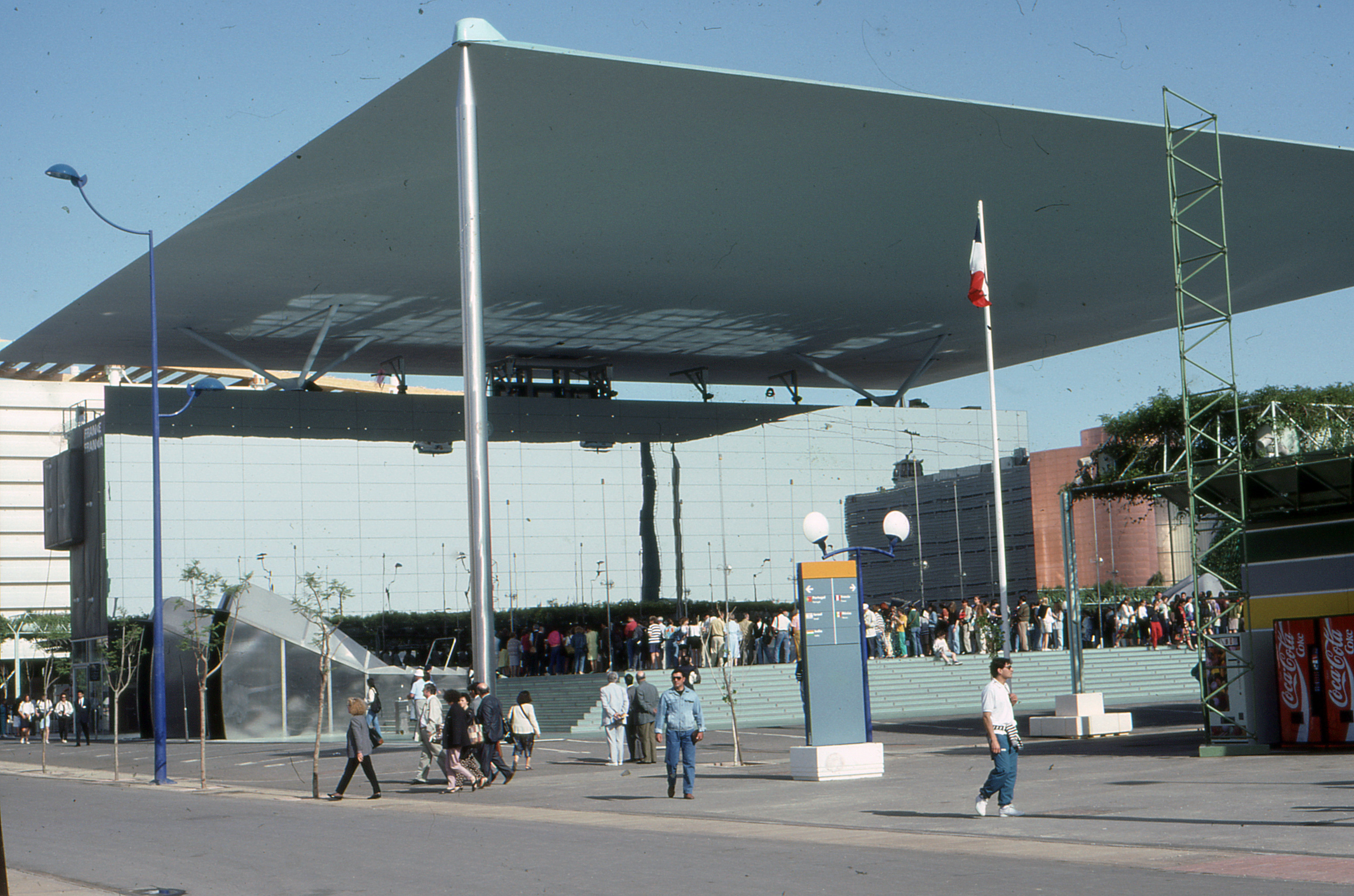
French Pavilion, Sevilla Expo '92

- 1992 France Pavilion at the World Exhibition in Seville
- 1997 Social Headquarters Alstom Transport Alstom in Saint-Ouen
- 1997 AstraZeneca Pharmaceutical social headquarter, Rueil-Malmaison. (for which he will receive the award Business Week / Architectural Record 1999 - American Institute of Architect)
- 1998 France television Headquarters, Paris
- 2000 Landscaping around the Pont du Gard
- 2000 Parc André-Citroën in Paris
  Coeur Defense
- 2001 Coeur Defense towers, La Défense
- 2002 Headquarters BMS (Bristol Myers Squibb) / UPSA in Rueil-Malmaison
- 2002 Media Cathedral, Reims
- 2002 Shopping center, Carré Sénart
- 2002 Sofitel Chicago Water Tower, Chicago, US
- 2004 Ilot M7, office building including the Ministry of Sports, and shops. Paris
- 2005 Hotel Novotel Le Havre.
- 2008 Office building, housing, shops, parking, Vorosmarty Square, Budapest, Hungary
- 2008 Natural History Museum of Toulouse, Toulouse
- 2008 Mcnay art Museum extension, San Antonio, Texas, United States
- 2008 ZAC de la Joliette, Block D3, Heart Mediterranean, Marseille
- 2008 Zac Seguin Lot A1, Angle Building, Boulogne-Billancourt
- 2009 Residential building, Paris ^{15th} Convention
- 2009 Sodexho France headquarters, Guyancourt in the Yvelines
- 2010 Hospital Castres Mazamet
- 2012 Leisure Pole, Lyon Confluence
- 2012 Morocco Telecom tower, Rabat, Morocco
- 2013 University Cancer Institute, Cancéropole Toulouse
- 2013 SFR Headquarters in Saint-Denis
- 2013 UGC theatre, Paris
- 2014 Majunga tower La Defense
- 2014 Amphitheatre district, Metz
- 2014 Holon, urban park in Israel
