= Lusitania Peace Memorial =

Monument in Cobh, County Cork, Ireland

Coordinates: 51°51′01″N 8°17′42″W

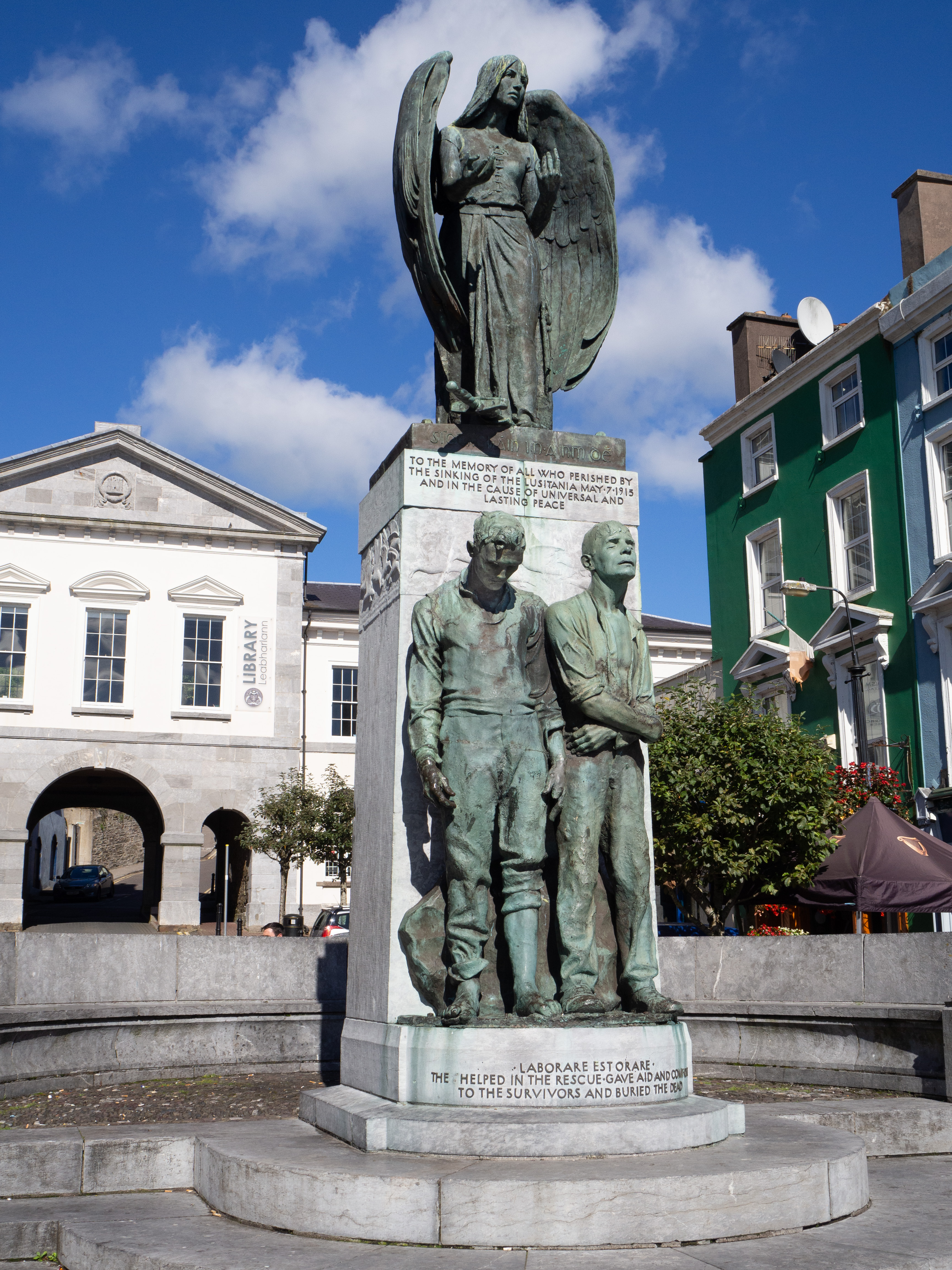
Lusitania Peace Memorial in 2018

The Lusitania Peace Memorial is a monument commemorating the victims of the sinking of the Lusitania, located in Cobh, Ireland. Commenced by Jerome Connor in the 1930s and completed in 1968, it is included on the Record of Protected Structures maintained by Cork County Council.

The monument features an angel hovering over two young fishermen. Originally conceptualized by Connor, the design was brought to fruition by other Irish artists following his death prior to the monument's completion.
