= Thomas Walsh (poet) =

American poet, essayist, and translator

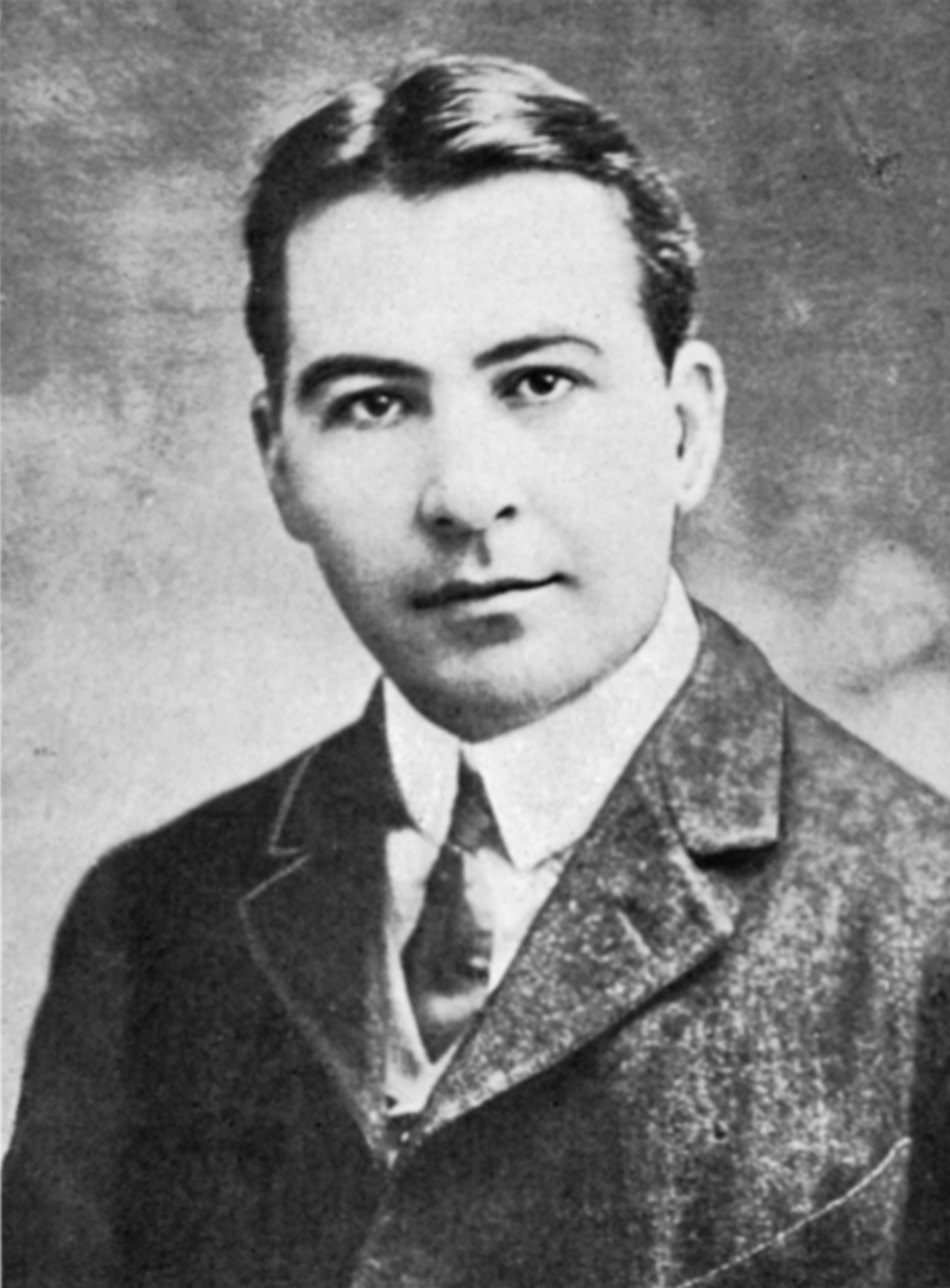
- Thomas Walsh, 1908
- Born: Thomas Walsh; October 14, 1875 Brooklyn, New York, U.S.
- Died: October 29, 1928 (aged 53) Brooklyn, New York, U.S.
- Occupation: Poet; essayist; translator

Thomas Walsh (1875–1928) was a poet, literary critic, translator, and scholar of Latin American and Spanish literature.

== Early life and education ==
Walsh was born in Brooklyn, New York, on October 14, 1875, to Michael Kavanagh Walsh and Catherine Farrell Walsh. He lived with his brothers Frank M. Walsh and Edward Maris Walsh, and sisters Lorna Walsh and Lydia Walsh, in the family's Brooklyn home.

Walsh was educated at Columbia University, Georgetown, Notre Dame, and Marquette University, from which institutions he received degrees in law, philosophy, and literature. He graduated from Georgetown in 1892, during which year he wrote the class poem, "Columbus." He also composed the Georgetown alumni ode "The Crusaders" in 1901, and read an ode for the dedication of the university's monument to John Carroll in 1912.

== Career as poet and translator ==
Walsh was well known in Brooklyn for having composed an ode which he read at the formal unveiling of the Prison Ship Martyrs' Monument in Fort Greene Park on November 14, 1908. He was the occasion's poet laureate. During his lifetime, Walsh published four books of poetry: The Prison Ships and Other Poems (1909), The Pilgrim Kings: Greco, Goya and Other Poems of Spain (1915), Gardens Overseas and Other Poems (1918), and Don Folquet and Other Poems (1920).

Walsh was an editor of the Catholic Encyclopedia and an anthology of translated Spanish poetry, the Hispanic Anthology (1920). According to John Bunker, "it is beyond question that his versions of many of the Spanish and Spanish-American poets introduced them to their first North American audience." He also served as an editor of Commonweal magazine from its founding in 1924 until his death in 1928. In addition to editing, Walsh also wrote many short articles and reviews, including several for the New York Times.

== Death ==
Walsh died suddenly of heart disease on the morning of October 29, 1928, on the steps of his home. A posthumous collection of his poems, Selected Poems of Thomas Walsh, was published in 1930. The volume "embodies about one-half of his entire poetic product" and includes a memoir of Walsh written by friend and fellow writer John Bunker and "appreciations" of Walsh by his friends Edward L. Keyes and Michael Williams. In his memoir, Bunker writes, "it is no exaggeration to say that he was one of the most noteworthy of our modern American ambassadors of culture."

== Awards and honors ==
Throughout his career, Walsh received many awards and honors for his work. He was given honorary memberships in the Royal Academy of Letters of Seville ("a distinction he shared with only one other American"), the Academy of Colombia, and the Hispanic Society of America. He also received the Grand Cross of Isabella Catolica, and the Honorary Medal of the Society of the Army of the Potomac.

== Works ==
- The Prison Ships and Other Poems (1909)
- The Pilgrim Kings: Greco, Goya and Other Poems of Spain (1915)
- Gardens Overseas and Other Poems (1918)
- Don Folquet and Other Poems (1920)
- Hispanic Anthology (1920)
- The Catholic Anthology: The World's Great Catholic Poetry (1927)
