= Jerome Connor =

Irish sculptor (1874–1943)

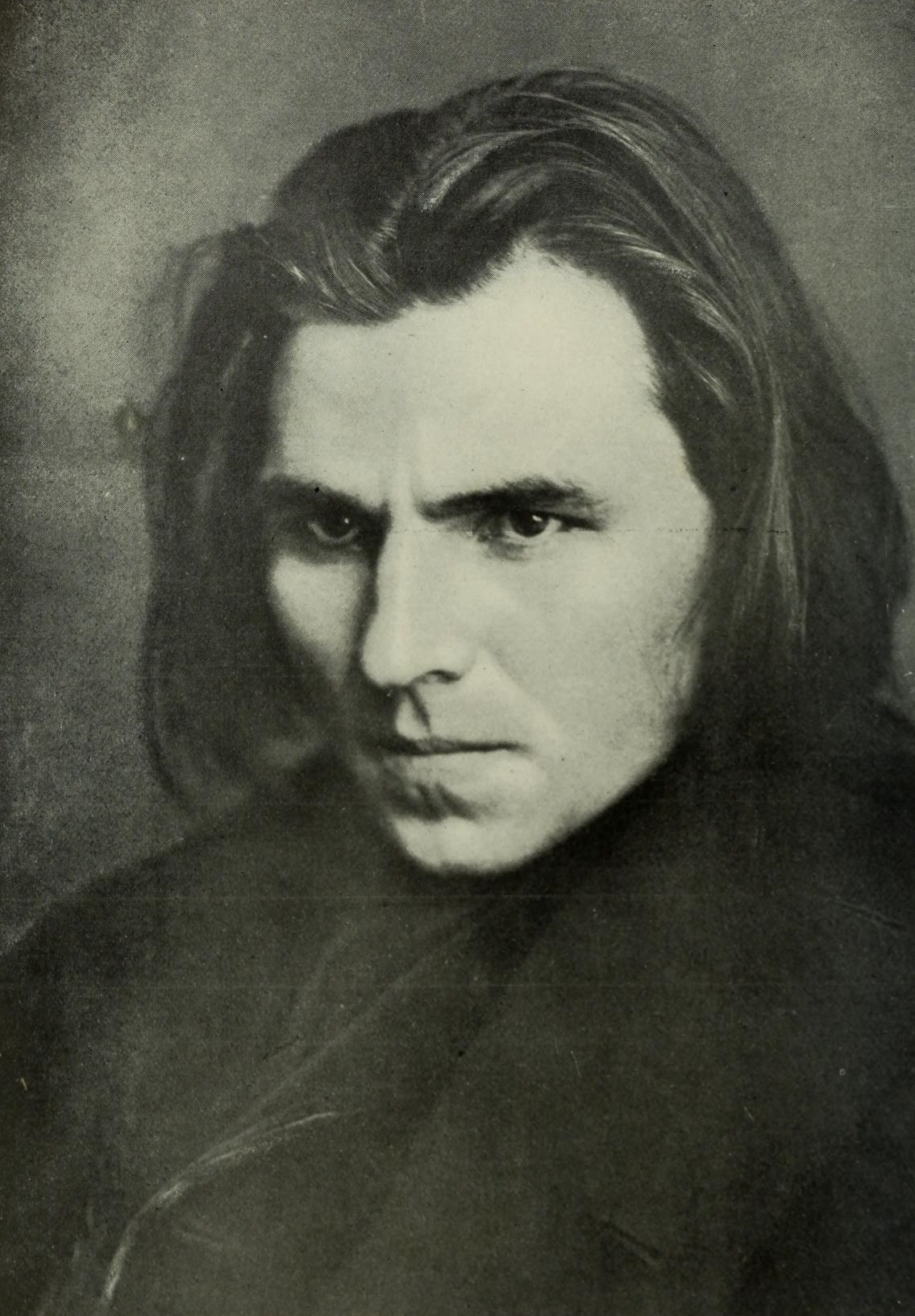
- Jerome Connor, c. 1903
- Born: 23 February 1874; Coumduff, Annascaul, County Kerry
- Died: 21 August 1943 (aged 69); Dublin
- Known for: sculpture

Jerome Connor (23 February 1874 in Coumduff, Annascaul, County Kerry – 21 August 1943 in Dublin) was an Irish sculptor.

== Life ==
In 1888, he emigrated to Holyoke, Massachusetts. His father was a stonemason, which led to Connor's jobs in New York as a sign painter, stonecutter, bronze founder and machinist. Inspired by his father's work and his own experience, Connor used to steal his father's chisels as a child and carve figures into rocks.

It is believed he may have assisted in the manufacture of bronzes such as the Civil War monument in Town Green in South Hadley, Massachusetts, erected in 1896 and The Court of Neptune Fountain at the Library of Congress in Washington, D.C., completed in 1898.

He joined the Roycroft arts community, in 1899, where he assisted with blacksmithing and later started creating terracotta busts and reliefs and eventually, he was recognized as Roycroft's sculptor-in-residence.

One of the most ambitious works he created was The Marriage of Art and Industry. Connor is reported to have dedicated the better part of a year on the monument's construction. With new ideas came additions, improvements, and increased weight. Connor worked on the upper floor of an old barn, and one evening, as Roycrofters and visitors relaxed on the peristyle of the Roycroft Inn, a thunderous crash was heard from Connor's studio. The beams under the second floor had given way, and Connor's Marriage fell to pieces. Fortunately, no one was hurt.

After four years at Roycroft, he then worked with Gustav Stickley and became well known as a sculptor being commissioned to create civic commissions in bronze for placement in Washington, D.C., Syracuse, East Aurora, New York, San Francisco, and in his native Ireland. In 1910, he established his own studio in Washington, D.C. From 1902 until his death, Connor produced scores of designs ranging from small portrait heads to relief panels to large civic commissions realized in bronze.

Connor was a self-taught artist who was highly regarded in the United States, where most of his public works can be seen. It was felt he was heavily influenced by the work of Irish American sculptor Augustus Saint Gaudens. He used the human figure to give expression to emotions, values and ideals. Many of the commissions he received were for civic memorials and secular figures which he cast in bronze, a pronounced departure from the Irish tradition of stone carved, church-sponsored works

Connor is a recognized world-class sculptor, and his best-known work is Nuns of the Battlefield located at the intersection of Rhode Island Ave NW, M St & Connecticut Ave NW in Washington, D.C., United States. Nuns of the Battlefield was surveyed in 1993 by the Smithsonian for their Save Outdoor Sculpture! program. It serves as a tribute to the over six hundred nuns who nursed soldiers of both armies during the Civil War, and is one of two monuments in the district that represent women's roles in the American Civil War. The sculpture was authorized by Congress on 29 March 1918 with the agreement that the government would not fund it. The Ancient Order of Hibernians raised $50,000 for the project. Jerome Connor was chosen since he focused on Irish Catholic themes, being one himself. but he ended up suing the order for nonpayment.

He worked in the United States until 1925 and moved to Dublin, where he opened his own studio, but lack of financial support and patrons caused his work to slow. In 1926 he was contacted by Roycroft and asked to design and cast a statue of Elbert Hubbard, who, with his wife Alice, had died in the sinking of the RMS Lusitania. It was unveiled in 1930 and today it stands on the lawn of East Aurora's Middle School across the street from the Roycroft Chapel building.

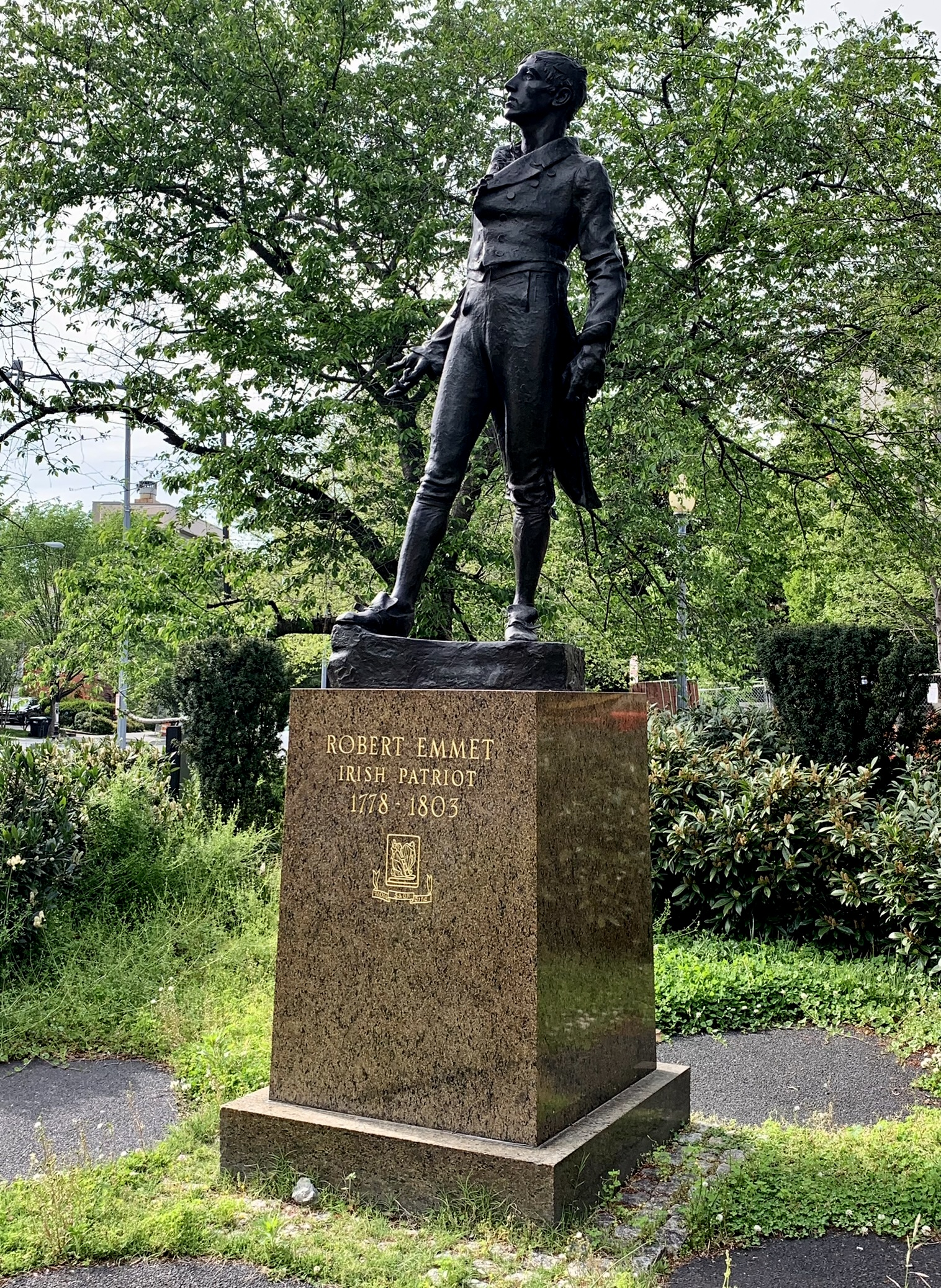
Bronze statue of Robert Emmet, 1916, by Jerome Connor, from the collection of the Smithsonian American Art Museum. Currently on view in Washington, D.C., on Massachusetts Avenue between 24th and S Streets, NW, in a small park near the Irish embassy.

While working on the Hubbard statue, Connor received a commission to create a memorial for all the Lusitania victims. It was to be erected in Cobh, County Cork, where many of the victims were buried. The project was initiated by the New York Memorial Committee, headed by William Henry Vanderbilt III, whose father Alfred Gwynne Vanderbilt, like Elbert and Alice Hubbard, perished on the Lusitania. Connor died before the Lusitania memorial was completed and based on Connor's design its installation fell to another Irish artist.

Throughout his career, Connor was also known as Patrick Jeremias Connor, Jerome Conner, Jerome Stanley Connor, J. Stanley Connor, and "St. Jerome" Connor.

He died on 21 August 1943 of heart failure and reputedly in poverty. There is a now a "Jerome Connor Place" in Dublin, and around the corner there is a plaque in his honour on Infirmary Road, overlooking Dublin's Phoenix Park (his favourite place) with the words of his friend the poet Patrick Kavanagh:

He sits in a corner of my memory
With his short pipe, holding it by the bowl,
And his sharp eye and his knotty fingers
And his laughing soul
Shining through the gaps of his crusty wall.

== Works ==
The following are some of Connor's public sculptures:

=== Major works in the United States ===
- Civil War Memorial, South Hadley, Massachusetts, 1897
- Bishop John Carroll, Georgetown University, Washington D.C., 1912
- The Supreme Sacrifice, Washington D.C., 1920
- Nuns of the Battlefield, Washington D.C., 1924
- Victory Memorial, The Bronx, New York City, 1925
- Elbert Hubbard, East Aurora, New York, 1930

=== Major works in Ireland ===
- Lusitania Peace Memorial, Cobh, begun in 1936, completed 1968
- Éire. Merrion Square, Dublin, erected 1976

== Jerome Connor Collection, Annascaul ==
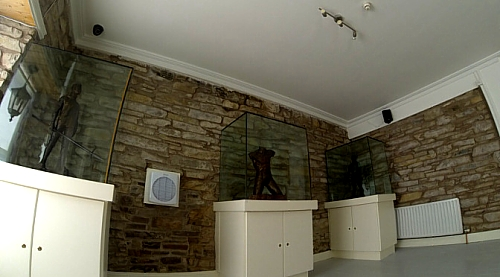
View of part of Jerome Connor Collection in Annascaul

In 1990 a Jerome Connor Trust was established in association with the National Gallery of Ireland to own eight of Connor's bronzes for inclusion in a projected gallery in Annascaul. The collection was subsequently expanded to fourteen pieces.

A permanent exhibition space for the trust collection, along with six pieces in private hands, was built at the South Pole Inn in Annascaul, and was officially opened in April 2014.

== Gallery ==
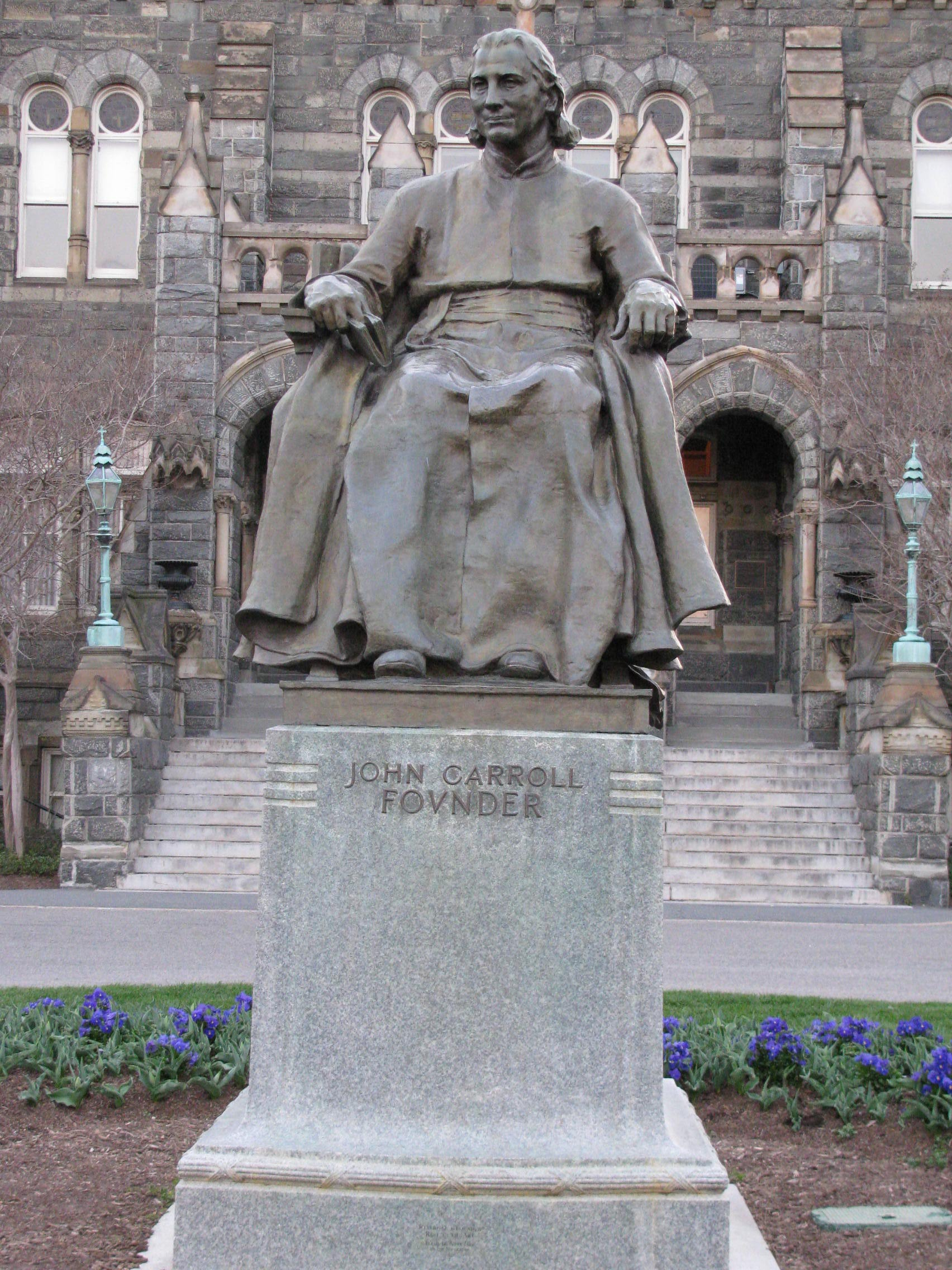
Bishop John Carroll

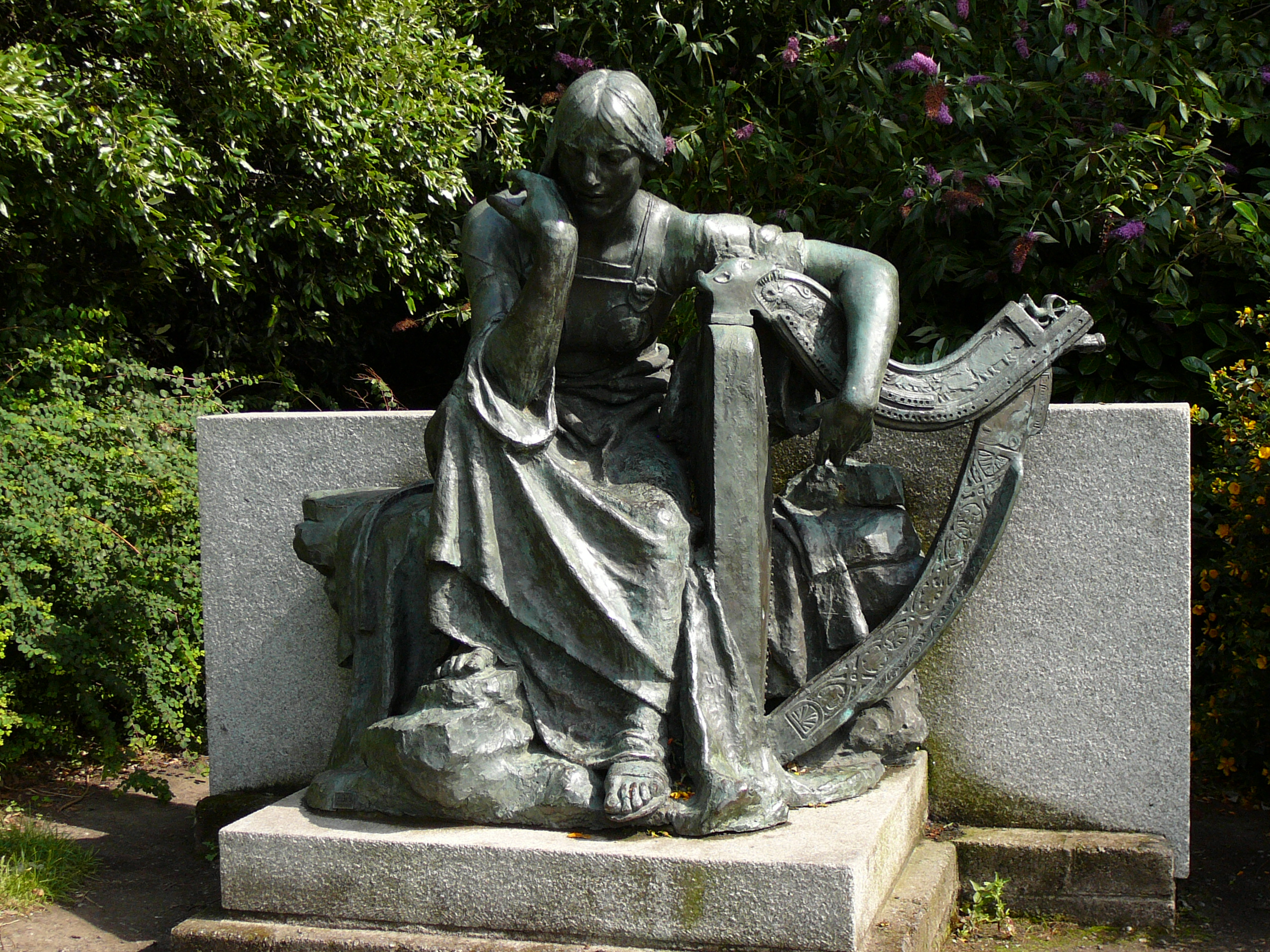
Éire, in Merrion Square, Dublin

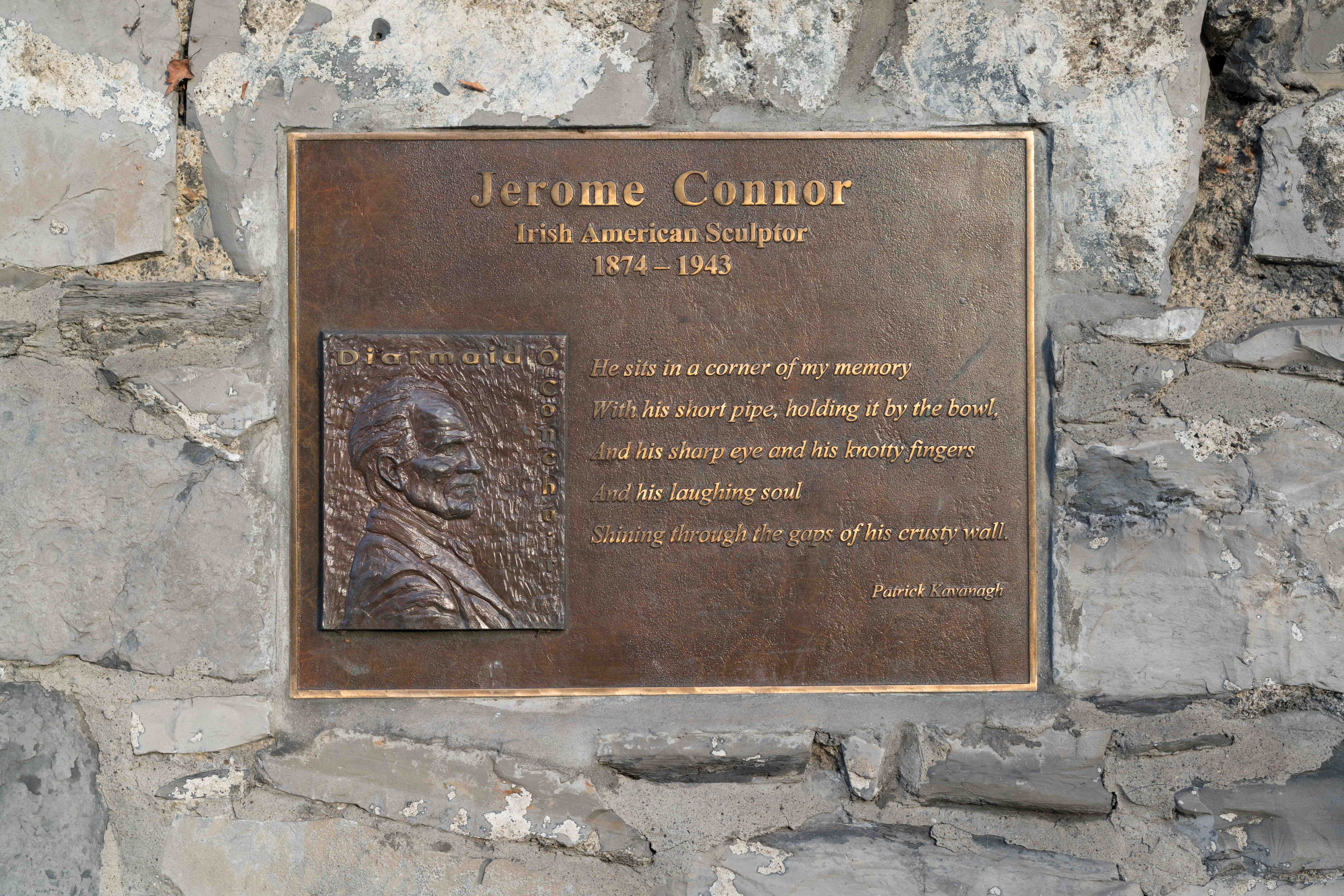
Plaque on Infirmary Road, Dublin

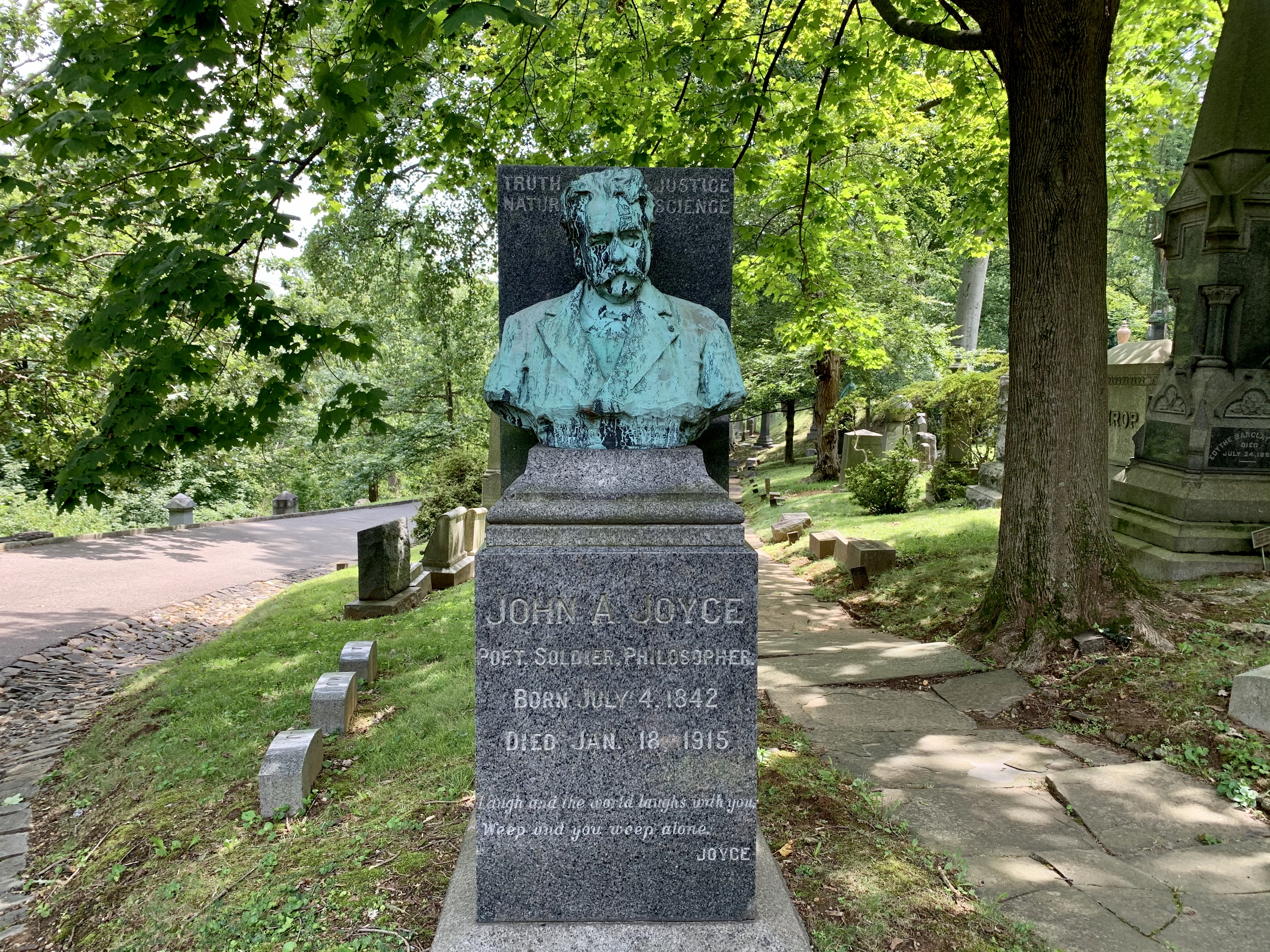
Bust of John Alexander Joyce in Oak Hill Cemetery, Washington, D.C.

Lusitania Memorial in Cobh
