= Anthony F. Ciampi =

Italian Jesuit educator (1816–1893)

The Reverend Anthony F. Ciampi SJ
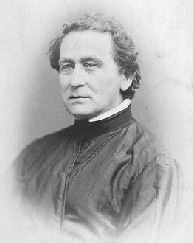
- Portrait of Anthony Ciampi

4th, 6th & 8th President of the College of the Holy Cross
- In office 1869–1873
- Preceded by: Robert W. Brady
- Succeeded by: Joseph B. O'Hagan
- In office 1857–1861
- Preceded by: Peter J. Blenkinsop
- Succeeded by: James Clark
- In office 1851–1854
- Preceded by: John Early
- Succeeded by: Peter J. Blenkinsop

4th President of Loyola College in Maryland
- In office 1863–1866
- Preceded by: Joseph O'Callaghan
- Succeeded by: John Early

Personal details
- Born: Antonio Francesco Ciampi; 29 January 1816 Rome, Papal States
- Died: 24 November 1893 (aged 77) Washington, D.C., U.S.
- Resting place: Jesuit Community Cemetery
- Education: Roman College; Georgetown University

Orders
- Ordination: 23 July 1848 by Samuel Eccleston

Anthony Francis Ciampi SJ (born Antonio Francesco Ciampi; 29 January 1816 – 24 November 1893) (Note: Some sources indicate that Ciampi was born on 31 January 1816.) was an Italian Catholic priest and Jesuit missionary to the United States. As the three-time president of the College of the Holy Cross, he was responsible for rebuilding the college after it was destroyed by fire. He also rescued it from financial ruin and pressure to close by the Jesuit superiors.

Born in Rome, Ciampi was educated at the Roman College before volunteering in 1840 as a missionary to the United States. He studied and was ordained at Georgetown University before working in various Jesuit institutions. In the 1850s and 1860s, he was twice the president of the College of the Holy Cross in Massachusetts, where he reformed the curriculum in the liberal arts tradition and reduced its significant debt.

In 1861, Ciampi left to minister to cholera patients in Massachusetts, contracting the disease himself, before becoming a missionary to American Indians and the growing Irish Catholic population in Maine. In 1863, he was made the president of Loyola College in Maryland, and garnered a reputation as a skilled preacher. Ciampi returned to Holy Cross as president in 1869, where he expanded Fenwick Hall and the campus. In his later years, he was the rector of the Jesuit novitiate in Frederick, Maryland, and the pastor of Holy Trinity and St. Aloysius churches in Washington, D.C.

== Early life ==
Antonio F. Ciampi was born on 29 January 1816, in Rome in the Papal States, to a prominent family. One of his uncles was Cardinal Giuseppe Sala. Ciampi studied at the Roman College, before entering the Jesuit novitiate at Sant'Andrea al Quirinale in Rome on 7 September 1832. He then studied philosophy at the Roman College, before teaching grammar at a Jesuit school in Piacenza from 1839 to 1840. After this, Ciampi taught grammar and the humanities in Ferrara from 1840 to 1844. In 1845, he returned to Rome to study theology for one year. He came to be considered an accomplished Latinist.

James A. Ryder, the president of the College of the Holy Cross in Worcester, Massachusetts, invited young Jesuits from the Roman College to become missionaries. In the mid-1840s, Ciampi accepted this invitation and sailed for the United States. He completed his studies at Georgetown University in Washington, D.C. On 21, 22 and 23 July 1848, Ciampi was ordained a subdeacon, deacon, and priest, respectively, at the Georgetown University chapel. He then spent the next three years engaged as a minister or missionary in various Jesuit institutions around the United States. In 1850, Ciampi completed his tertianship in Frederick, Maryland. From 1850 to 1851, he was a member of Georgetown University's board of directors. Ciampi professed his fourth vow on 8 September 1852.

== College of the Holy Cross ==
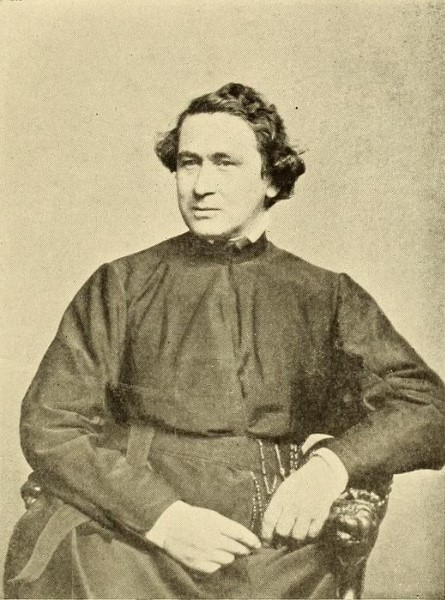
Portrait of Ciampi

=== First presidency ===
Ciampi was appointed the president of the College of the Holy Cross on 28 August 1851, at the age of 35. When he took office, Ciampi's main objectives were to decrease the college's high debt and to increase discipline among the Jesuits. He became a mentor to the school's 10 Jesuit brothers, and kept a daily journal of the college, which drew the praise of Jan Roothaan, the Jesuit Superior General. The college struggled to reduce its $8,500 debt because it lacked a charter that would have legally allowed it to collect on its debts. Nonetheless, Ciampi managed to reduce the debt, and was widely praised by both the Maryland provincial superior, Joseph Aschwanden, and the Holy Cross Jesuits for his financial acumen and piety.

On 14 July 1852, less than a year after Ciampi's appointment, a serious fire struck the college building, Fenwick Hall. Despite the efforts of the fire department and local citizens of Worcester to haul water nearly a quarter of a mile up the hill from the river, the entire building was destroyed, except for the east wing and the contents of the library, which were rescued from the fire. Student dormitories, including all their possessions, were lost, and the uninsured college, which had no savings, faced a cost of $50,000 (equivalent to approximately $1.48 million in 2024). The fire may have begun on the third floor by a professor who was burning old examination papers. Neighbors offered lodging for the night to the faculty and students, who were left with nowhere to live. The following day, all the students were sent home.

Within three days, Ciampi began planning to rebuild the college. However, Aschwanden, in a letter to Roothaan, vowed never to rebuild it due to the school's debt, its location outside of a major city, its competition for resources with the newly opened Loyola College in Baltimore, and the susceptibility of the surviving wing to another fire. He urged Ciampi to accept a new position in Philadelphia. Ciampi wrote to Roothaan directly, requesting not to be reassigned and in support of rebuilding the college. After a new provincial superior, Charles Stonestreet, was appointed, Roothaan decided to allow Holy Cross to be rebuilt.

Bishop John Bernard Fitzpatrick of Boston called for Catholics to donate to the reconstruction. Ciampi raised money, increased tuition, and cut expenses, declining to heat the building into autumn, but faced hesitation from Stonestreet. A new and larger building was opened on 3 October 1853. Enrollment was slow to rebound after reopening. Ciampi is credited with the college's survival after being destroyed. On 13 August 1854, he was succeeded as president by Peter J. Blenkinsop.

=== Second presidency ===
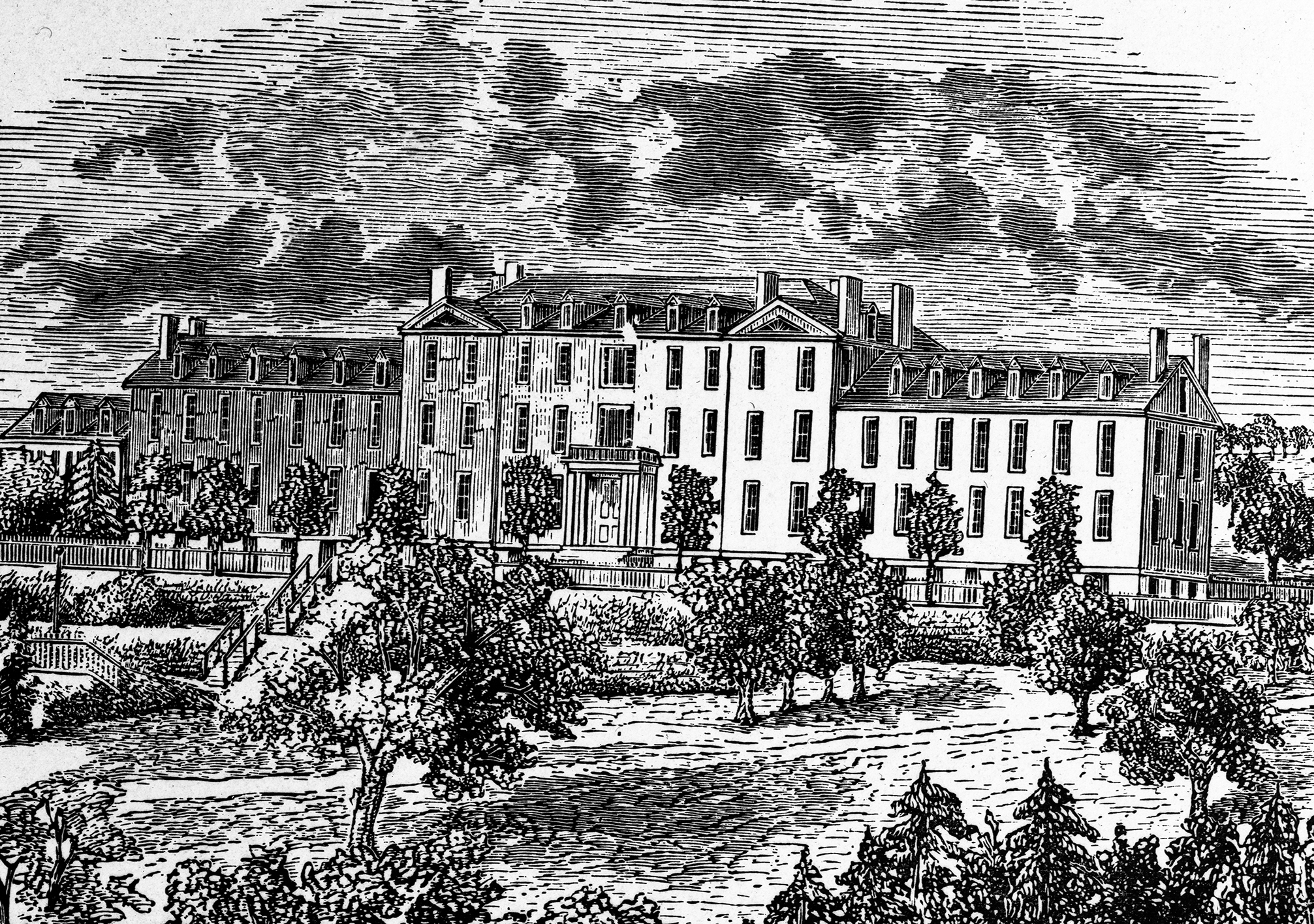
Ciampi rebuilt Fenwick Hall (pictured 1861) after its destruction.

Ciampi was selected to resume the presidency after Blenkinsop, taking office on 15 August 1857. Nine days after taking office, the Panic of 1857 occurred, straining the college's finances. The school also lacked funds to hire a sufficient number of teachers, and besides Patrick Healy, those it had were of poor quality. Ciampi was unable to restrain several Jesuit scholastics who corporally punished and injured students, against Ciampi's orders and the Jesuit's rules. In December 1857, Ciampi had to send the students home early to avoid the cost of housing them.

Nonetheless, by the end of Ciampi's tenure, the financial condition of the college improved. With the economic recovery of 1858, Ciampi raised significant funds and reduced the college's debt from $9,300 to $3,100 by 1861. As a result, Ciampi was regarded as a good manager. By 1859, he and Bishop Fitzpatrick ultimately persuaded the new superior general Peter Jan Beckx not to close the college.

Meanwhile, some at Holy Cross disliked Ciampi's "Roman manners" and criticized his pedagogy as overbearing. They also criticized his frequent absences from campus and his friendly relations with a woman whom he converted to Catholicism. Beckx wrote to Ciampi that while his absences were for good causes, he had to be present on campus. By 1858, even though Ciampi had ceased his extended departures from campus, the new provincial superior, Burchard Villiger, wanted Beckx to remove Ciampi. However, Beckx declined to do so because many viewed Ciampi as essential to the continued improvement of Holy Cross. Beckx appointed a visitor to the entire Jesuit province in 1859, who praised Ciampi's work.

Ciampi reformed the curriculum to instruct students in the liberal arts, patterned on the Ratio Studiorum. He also eliminated the student uniform due to the inability of some families to afford them. On 15 August 1861, Ciampi was succeeded by James Clark.

=== Third presidency ===
Ciampi was appointed the president of the College of the Holy Cross for a third time on 28 August 1869, to succeed Robert W. Brady. During his term, he oversaw the expansion and completion of Fenwick Hall, which afforded a greater number of classrooms, student residences, and scientific spaces. Ciampi also expanded the campus by purchasing land along the Blackstone River, constructed a new barn, stable, and carriage house, and improved the campus farm. At the same time, he again significantly reduced the college's debt. Ciampi again slightly revised the curriculum.

While Ciampi was considered a successful administrator, he disliked delegating authority, and some complained about him to the Jesuit superiors. By 1872, the superiors had decided they would replace him. On 31 July 1873, Ciampi's term ended, and he was succeeded by Joseph B. O'Hagan.

== Loyola College in Maryland ==
Ciampi was appointed the president of Loyola College in Maryland in September 1863, succeeding Joseph O'Callaghan. At the same time, Ciampi became the pastor of St. Ignatius Church in Baltimore. In October of that year, the parish raised money and purchased a former Universalist church in the city, for the use of black Catholics. Later known as St. Francis Xavier Church, the parish was dedicated the following year.

At Loyola College, Ciampi introduced new practices, such as teaching the waltz, and abandoned others that he found unsuited to American students, such as a mandatory daily prayer of the rosary.

During this time, Ciampi garnered a reputation as an effective preacher, and was described as having just a slight Italian accent. He was described by his contemporaries as "one of the brilliant and most popular" Italian missionaries in the United States. As pastor, he emphasized the importance of church music. In 1866, he was a member of the council of the Archbishop of Baltimore, Martin John Spalding. Ciampi held these positions until July 1866, and he was succeeded by John Early.

== Pastoral ministry ==
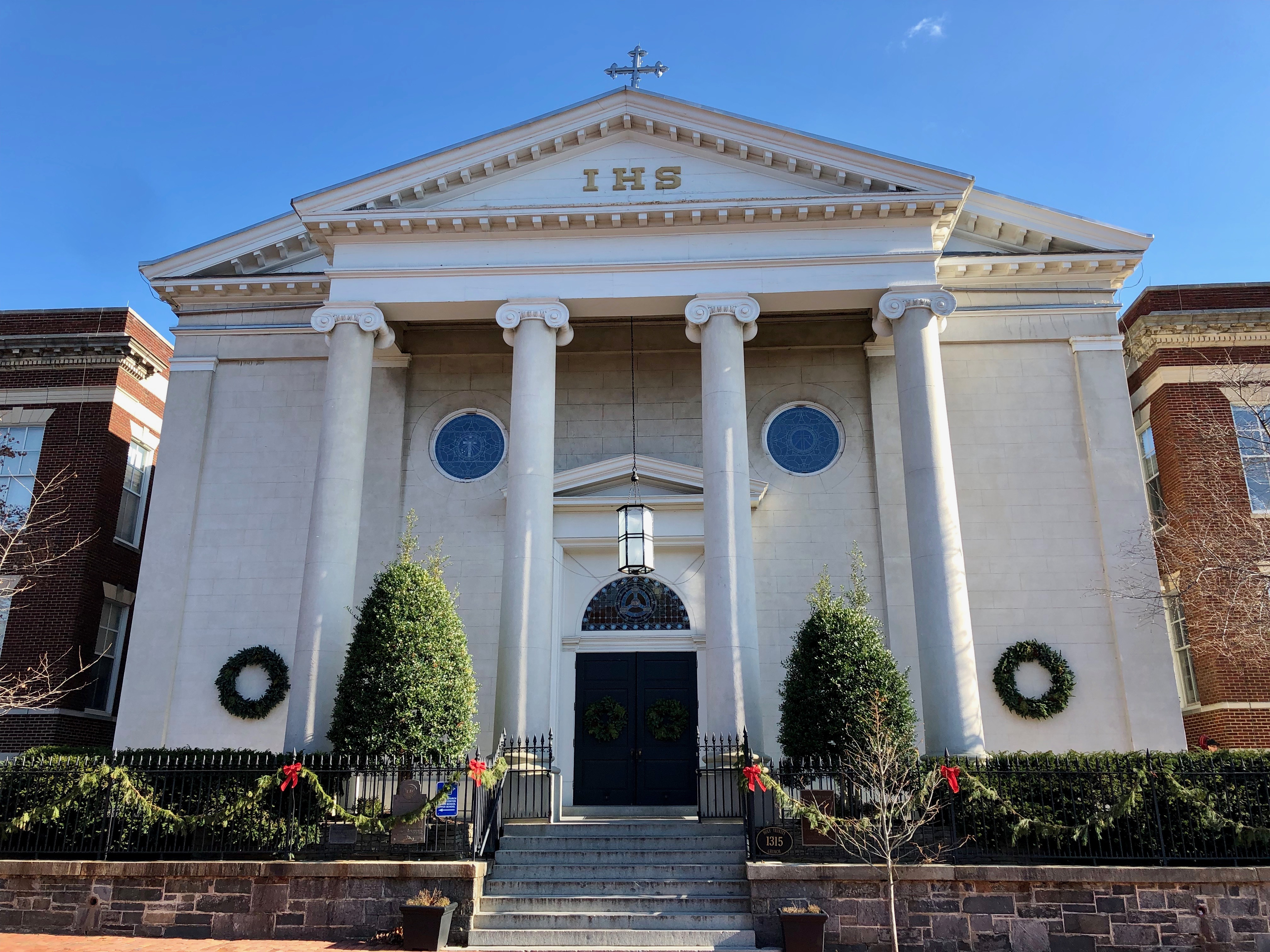
Ciampi was the pastor of Holy Trinity Church in Washington, D.C. three times.

After the end of his first presidency of the College of the Holy Cross, Ciampi engaged in missionary work. He first went to Chicopee, Massachusetts, where he ministered to cholera patients, and contradicted the disease himself. He also worked for some time in Rhode Island. In February 1854, Archbishop Gaetano Bedini submitted Ciampi's name to the Vatican for consideration as the bishop of the newly created Diocese of Portland in Maine. Ciampi asked Stonestreet to help oppose his elevation to the episcopate.

Ciampi eventually requested to be assigned to the Jesuits' Maine mission, and in November 1854, was sent to Bangor, where he engaged in pastoral work for two years, ministering to American Indians and poor Irish Catholics. In the view of John Bapst, the superior of the Maine mission, Ciampi added prestige to the mission. The number of Catholics in Maine was quickly growing, and Ciampi delivered sermons in fluent English, with few people knowing he was a foreigner.

In 1856, Ciampi succeeded Aschwanden as the pastor of Holy Trinity Church in Georgetown in the District of Columbia. He held that office until the following year, when he was succeeded by Thomas F. Mulledy. While pastor of Holy Trinity, Ciampi was also one of many Italian Jesuits to teach at Georgetown University, where he was also the vice president and treasurer. In 1856, the superior of the Jesuits' California Mission, Nicholas Congiato, requested that the provincial superior, Stonestreet, appoint Ciampi as the president of the newly established Santa Clara University, in exchange for a different Jesuit being reassigned from California to Maryland. Stonestreet refused, saying that was not an even trade and accusing Congiato of "Italian trickery".

After his presidency of Loyola College, Ciampi returned to the Holy Trinity Church in Georgetown as pastor in 1866, replacing Alphonse Charlier. He remained there as pastor until 1868, when he was succeeded by Louis Hippolyte Gache. He then traveled throughout the eastern United States, teaching and leading retreats and conferences. From 1872 to 1873, Ciampi was again a member of Georgetown University's board of directors. In 1876, Ciampi succeeded Bernard A. Maguire as the pastor of St. Aloysius Church in Washington, D.C., where his reputation as a capable preacher continued. He held this position until 1878.

Ciampi returned as pastor to Holy Trinity Church for a third time in 1878, succeeding John J. Murphy. He held this post until he was replaced by Stephen A. Kelly in 1881. Ciampi became the rector of the Jesuits' St. Stanislaus novitiate in Frederick, Maryland, in 1883, succeeding Archibald J. Tisdall. He held this office until 26 August 1887, when he was succeeded by Michael O'Kane. In 1890, Ciampi was the chaplain at Gonzaga College in Washington, D.C. For a time, Ciampi was also the pastor of St. John the Evangelist Church in Frederick, Maryland. At the end of his life, Ciampi was a priest at St. Aloysius Church.

== Death and legacy ==
Ciampi died on 24 November 1893, aged 77, at Providence Hospital in Washington, D.C. He was buried at the Jesuit Community Cemetery at Georgetown University. Ciampi Hall at the College of the Holy Cross opened on 25 March 1991, as the school's Jesuit residence. In 2024, it was converted into a student residence and renamed Ciampi–Condon Hall.

== Notes ==
Academic offices
Preceded by John Early	4th President of the College of the Holy Cross; 1851–1854	Succeeded by Peter J. Blenkinsop
Preceded by Peter J. Blenkinsop	6th President of the College of the Holy Cross; 1857–1861	Succeeded by James Clark
Preceded by Joseph O'Callaghan	4th President of Loyola College in Maryland; 1863–1866	Succeeded by John Early
Preceded by Robert W. Brady	8th President of the College of the Holy Cross; 1869–1873	Succeeded by Joseph B. O'Hagan
Preceded by Archibald J. Tisdall	8th Rector of St. Stanislaus Novitiate; 1883–1887	Succeeded by Michael O'Kane
Catholic Church titles
Preceded by Joseph Aschwanden	16th Pastor of Holy Trinity Catholic Church; 1856–1857	Succeeded by Thomas F. Mulledy
Preceded by Joseph O'Callaghan	4th Pastor of St. Ignatius Church; 1863–1866	Succeeded by John Early
Preceded by Alphonse Charlier	20th Pastor of Holy Trinity Catholic Church; 1866–1868	Succeeded by Louis Hippolyte Gache
Preceded by Bernard A. Maguire	Pastor of St. Aloysius Church; 1876–1878	Succeeded by —
Preceded by John J. Murphy	25th Pastor of Holy Trinity Catholic Church; 1878–1881	Succeeded by Stephen A. Kelly
