= Robert W. Brady =

American Jesuit educator (1825–1891)

The Reverend Robert W. Brady SJ
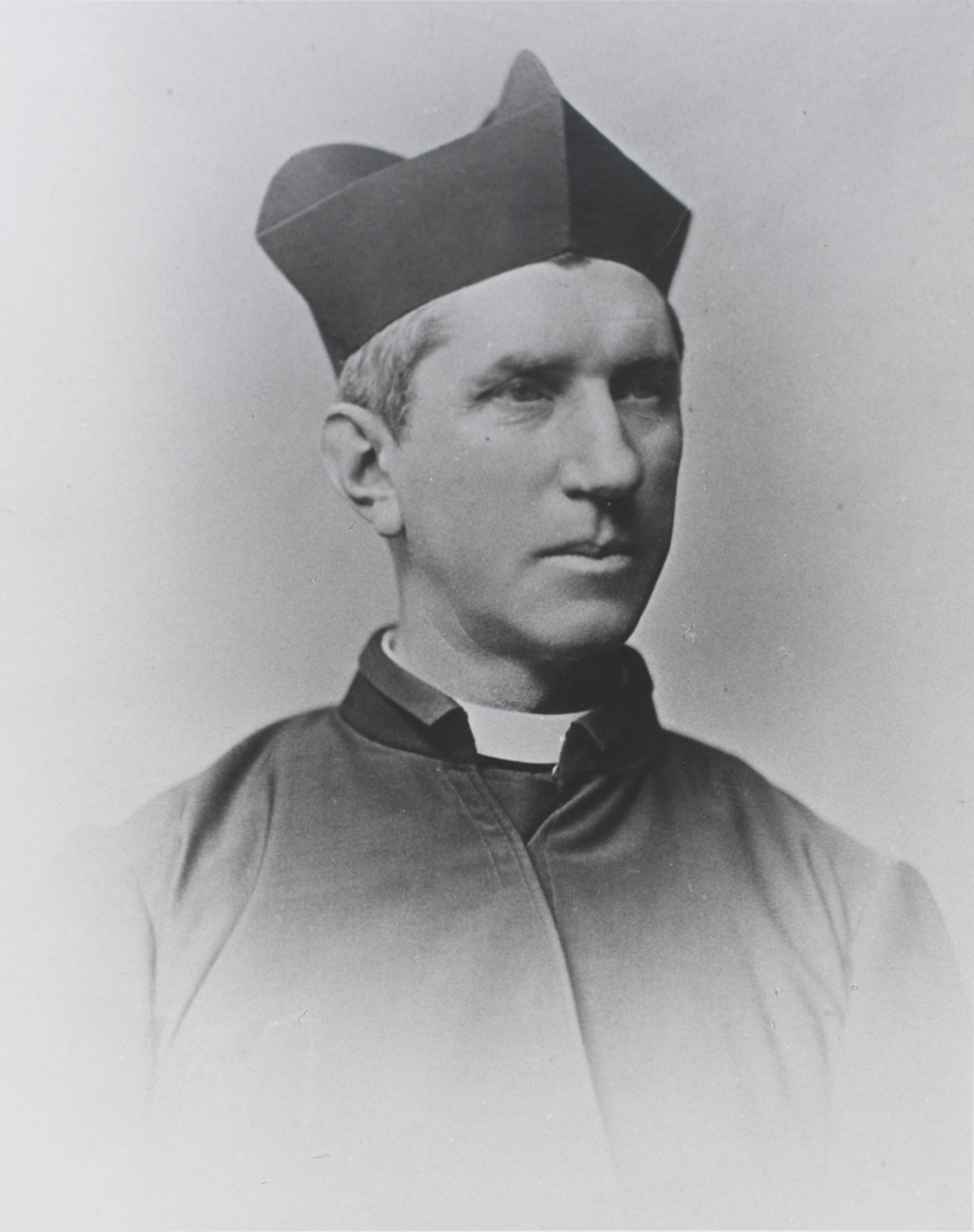
- Photograph of Brady around 1870

8th & 12th President of the College of the Holy Cross
- In office 1883–1887
- Preceded by: Edward D. Boone
- Succeeded by: Samuel Cahill
- In office 1867–1869
- Preceded by: James Clark
- Succeeded by: Anthony F. Ciampi

2nd President of Boston College
- In office 1869–1870
- Preceded by: John Bapst
- Succeeded by: Robert J. Fulton

Personal details
- Born: October 6, 1825 Hancock, Maryland, U.S.
- Died: March 26, 1891 (aged 65) Washington, D.C., U.S.
- Resting place: Jesuit Community Cemetery

Orders
- Ordination: July 25, 1857 by Peter Richard Kenrick

Robert Wasson Brady SJ (October 6, 1825 – March 26, 1891) was an American Catholic priest who led several Jesuit institutions in the United States. He served twice as the president of the College of the Holy Cross from 1867 to 1869 and from 1883 to 1887. He was also the second president of Boston College from 1869 to 1870 and the provincial superior of the Jesuits' Maryland Province from 1877 to 1882.

== Early life ==
Robert Wasson Brady was born on October 6, 1825, in Hancock, Maryland. In his youth, Brady's father died and his mother moved the family to Frederick, Maryland, so that Brady could study at Saint John's College. He then decided to enter religious life, and proceeded to the Jesuit novitiate in Frederick, where he entered the Society of Jesus on August 31, 1843.

In 1845, Brady became a professor of rudiments at Georgetown College. However, he began experiencing health problems and his superiors transferred him in 1847 to the newly founded College of the Holy Cross in Worcester, Massachusetts, where they thought the climate would be more advantageous to his health. Brady's health did improve, and he was made the prefect of the school as well as a professor of grammar and poetry.

=== Formative years in Maryland ===
While continuing in his roles as prefect and professor, Brady began his next stage of Jesuit formation, the study of philosophy and theology, in September 1853. Four years later, he completed his studies and was ordained a priest by Archbishop Peter Richard Kenrick of St. Louis on July 25, 1857, in the students' chapel at Holy Cross. Brady was then promoted to vice president and first prefect of discipline of the school.

In 1859, Brady returned to Frederick in 1859 to complete his third year of probation (a part of his Jesuit formation). He professed his third vow on August 15, 1860. That year, he was sent to Loyola College in Baltimore, where he became a minister and teacher of algebra. In 1861, he was assigned to teach juniors at the college, and the following year, he left the college to become a priest at St. Aloysius Church in Washington, D.C. His time in Washington coincided with the Civil War, and Brady ministered to soldiers in military hospitals.

== Academic career in New England ==
At the end of 1863, Brady moved to Boston, where he became the superior of St. Mary's Church in the North End. On July 10 of that year, he was elected to a three-year term as the treasurer and a member of the board of directors of Boston College. As superior of St. Mary's, Brady refused to continue paying the $3,000 per year (equivalent to approximately $78,000 in 2025) to Boston College that had been paid by his predecessors. The college's president, John Bapst, unsuccessfully protested Brady's decision, and Bishop John Bernard Fitzpatrick of Boston stated that St. Mary's had been placed under the direction of the Society of Jesus so that its revenue could support the newly founded Boston College.

On February 27, 1867, Brady was named the president of the College of the Holy Cross, replacing James Clark. The college's board of trustees authorized Brady to take out $46,000 in loans to expand the school physical facilities. Brady oversaw the addition of a west wing and spires to Fenwick Hall, the college's original building. The new wing included a library, meeting rooms for the debating society, and dormitories for students and the Jesuits; it also saw the addition of steam heating to the building. The project cost a total of $50,000. Brady left to become the second president of Boston College on August 27, 1869, succeeding John Bapst. At Holy Cross, he was succeeded by Anthony F. Ciampi. Instead of taking the typical title of president and rector, Brady and his successor, Robert J. Fulton, took the title of vice rector, because the school was still in the process of being established. At the same time that he was president, Brady was the pastor of the Church of the Immaculate conception in Boston's South End. On August 2, 1870, Brady left Boston College to once again resume the position of superior of St. Mary's Church. At St. Mary's, he oversaw the construction of a new church building and rectory.

== Provincial leadership ==
Brady succeeded Joseph E. Keller as the provincial superior of the Jesuits' Maryland Province on May 8, 1877, and professed his final vows that day. With the unification of the Maryland and New York provinces on August 7, 1879, Brady assumed the position of provincial of the New York Province. The province was renamed the Maryland–New York Province on August 19, 1880. Brady was succeeded as provincial by Robert J. Fulton on May 28, 1882.

Following his term as provincial, Brady became an operarius (a Jesuit ministering away from his home community) in Jersey City, New Jersey. On June 28, 1883, he again returned to the College of the Holy Cross to replace Edward D. Boone as president. In 1883, while president, Brady was sent to the Jesuits' 23rd general congregation as an elector. Despite experiencing poor health, he was sent to Italy in 1886 to temporarily become the procurator of the Jesuit Province of Fiesole. Upon his return in November 1886, he became the vice provincial superior and acting superior of the Maryland–New York Province while Fulton was appointed a visitor in Ireland; Brady held this position until May 1887. Brady's second term as president of Holy Cross ended on August 2, 1887, and he was succeeded by Samuel Cahill.

== Later years ==
Around this time, Brady became ill and was assigned to various posts in Maryland and Washington, D.C. that would be less taxing than his previous roles. He first became an operarius at Bohemia Manor in Cecil County, Maryland. He then was made the superior of St. Thomas Manor in Charles County and then spiritual father at Georgetown College.

In 1890, Brady succeeded Stephen A. Kelly as the pastor of Holy Trinity Church in Georgetown, where he would spend the remainder of his life. On March 16, 1891, he became ill with pneumonia and was taken to nearby Georgetown College. He was administered last rites on March 26, and he died that day. John J. Murphy replaced Brady as pastor of Holy Trinity. His funeral was held at Holy Trinity Church on March 30, and he was buried that day in the Jesuit Community Cemetery.

== Sources ==
- Dunigan, David R. (1947). Crowley, Francis M. (ed.). A History of Boston College. The Catholic Education Series. Milwaukee: Bruce Publishing Co. OCLC 855266992 – via Internet Archive.
- "Father Robert Wasson Brady: A Sketch" (PDF). Woodstock Letters. 20 (2): 250–255. June 1891. Archived (PDF) from the original on March 6, 2021 – via Jesuit Archives.
- Gramatowski, Wiktor (2013). Jesuit Glossary: Guide to understanding the documents (PDF). Translated by Russell, Camilla. Rome: Archivum Romanum Societatis Iesu. Archived (PDF) from the original on July 4, 2019.
- Kuzniewski, Anthony J. (1999). Thy Honored Name: A History of the College of the Holy Cross, 1843–1994. Washington, D.C.: Catholic University of America Press. ISBN 978-0-81320-911-1. Archived from the original on March 25, 2020 – via Google Books.
- Lapomarda, Vincent A. (1977). The Jesuit Heritage in New England. Worcester, Massachusetts: The Jesuits of Holy Cross College, Inc. ISBN 978-0960629404. Archived from the original on March 22, 2021 – via CrossWorks.
- Ramspacher, Joseph H. (July 1962). "Major Superiors in the Northern United States" (PDF). Woodstock Letters. 91 (3): 300–303. Archived (PDF) from the original on February 11, 2020 – via Jesuit Archives.

Academic offices
Preceded by James Clark	8th President of the College of the Holy Cross; 1867–1869	Succeeded by Anthony F. Ciampi
Preceded by John Bapst	2nd President of Boston College; 1869–1870	Succeeded by Robert J. Fulton
Preceded by Edward D. Boone	12th President of the College of the Holy Cross; 1883–1887	Succeeded by Samuel Cahill
Catholic Church titles
Preceded by Francis diMaria	5th Superior of St. Mary's Church; 1863–1867	Succeeded by Denis O'Kane
Preceded by John Bapst	3rd Pastor of the Church of the Immaculate Conception; 1869–1870	Succeeded by Robert J. Fulton
Preceded by Denis O'Kane	7th Superior of St. Mary's Church; 1870–1877	Succeeded by William H. Duncan
Preceded by Joseph E. Keller	11th Provincial Superior of the Jesuit Maryland Province; 1877–1879	Succeeded by Himself as Provincial of the New York Province
Preceded by Himself as Provincial of the Maryland Province	Provincial Superior of the Jesuit New York Province; 1879–1880	Succeeded by Himself as Provincial of the Maryland–New York Province
Preceded by Himself as Provincial of the New York Province	Provincial Superior of the Jesuit Maryland–New York Province; 1880–1882	Succeeded by Robert J. Fulton
Preceded by Stephen A. Kelly	27th Pastor of Holy Trinity Church; 1890–1891	Succeeded by John J. Murphy
