= Edward A. McGurk =

American Jesuit educator (1841–1896)

The Reverend Edward A. McGurk SJ
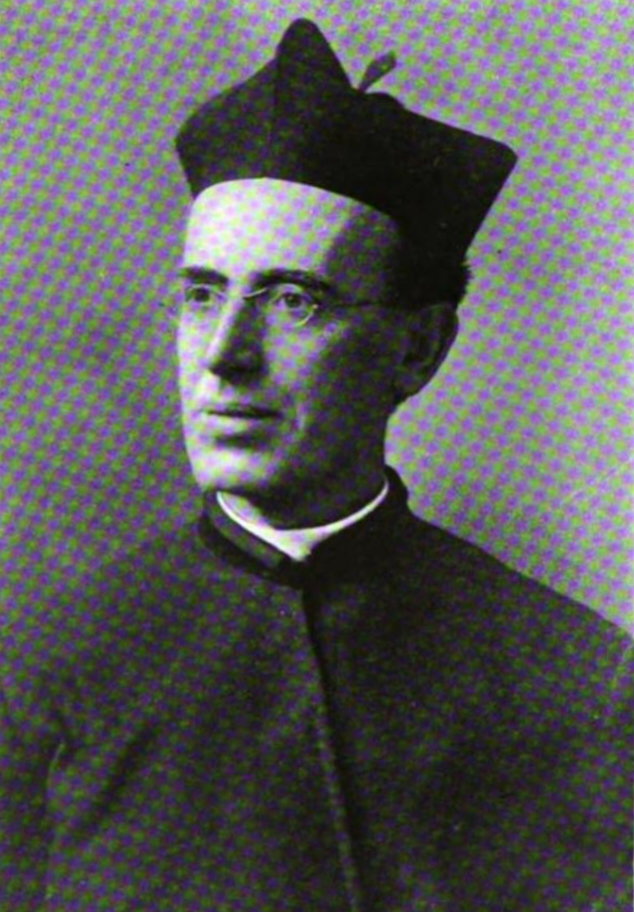

15th President of the College of the Holy Cross
- In office 1893–1895
- Preceded by: Michael O'Kane
- Succeeded by: John F. Lehy

8th President of Loyola College in Maryland
- In office 1877–1885
- Preceded by: Stephen A. Kelly
- Succeeded by: Francis Smith

Personal details
- Born: October 6, 1841 Philadelphia, Pennsylvania, U.S.
- Died: July 3, 1896 (aged 54) Fairhaven, Massachusetts, U.S.
- Resting place: College of the Holy Cross Cemetery
- Education: Georgetown University; Woodstock College

Orders
- Ordination: 1872

Edward A. McGurk SJ (1841 – July 3, 1896) was an American Catholic priest and Jesuit who was the president of Loyola College in Maryland from 1877 to 1885 and the president of the College of the Holy Cross from 1893 to 1895. Born in Philadelphia, he entered the Society of Jesus in 1857. He taught at Holy Cross before becoming the president of Loyola College, where he liquidated some of the school's debt, which had accrued during the Civil War. In 1885, McGurk became the president of Gonzaga College (later a high school) in Washington, D.C. During his tenure, he constructed a new residence for the Jesuits and scholastics.

In 1893, McGurk became the president of Holy Cross. He took office during a dispute over the construction of a new building. He oversaw the completion of the building, which required fundraising and the assumption of significant debt. The new building, O'Kane Hall, opened in 1895. McGurk died in office in 1896.

== Early life ==
McGurk was born in Philadelphia, Pennsylvania, on October 6, 1841. (Note: While the majority of sources say McGurk was born in Philadelphia, one says that he was born in New York City.) He studied at St. Joseph's Preparatory School before entering the Society of Jesus on July 20, 1857, proceeding to the novitiate in Frederick, Maryland. While there, the Civil War broke out. The novitiate was converted into a hospital for Union soldiers, and McGurk tended to some of the soldiers. He pronounced his Jesuit perpetual vows in 1859 and then spent two more years studying at Frederick. In September 1861, McGurk was sent to the College of the Holy Cross in Worcester, Massachusetts, for his regency, where he served as a teacher. He was the prefect of studies there from 1874 to 1876.

In 1866, McGurk went to Washington, D.C., to begin his philosophical studies at Georgetown University. When the new Jesuit house of studies, Woodstock College, opened in September 1869 in Maryland, he continued his education there as a member of its first cohort. In the summer of 1872, McGurk was ordained a priest at Woodstock.

McGurk was then sent to Boston College for two years. For some of this time, he was vice president of the college. Afterwards, he became the chair of rhetoric at the College of the Holy Cross. In 1876, McGurk went to the Frederick novitiate to complete his tertianship. He then professed his fourth vow on August 15, 1877.

== Loyola College ==
In 1877, McGurk succeeded Stephen A. Kelly as the president of Loyola College in Maryland. At the same time, he became the pastor of St. Ignatius Church, which was attached to the college. When he assumed office, the school was burdened by significant debt, which had accrued during the Civil War. McGurk successfully liquidated some of this debt, which his predecessor had begun to do. He also raised the academic standards of the school and renovated St. Ignatius Church. McGurk remained president and pastor until 1885, when he was succeeded by Francis Smith.

== Gonzaga College ==
On July 31, 1885, McGurk succeeded John J. Murphy as the president of Gonzaga College in Washington, D.C. (later known as Gonzaga College High School). At the same time, he became the pastor of St. Aloysius Church. In 1886, he began raising money from parishioners to construct a new residence for the priests and Jesuit scholastics of the church and school. On May 26 of that year, construction began on the new building, which opened on August 1, 1887. Enrollment remained low during his presidency, numbering 87 students during the academic year of 1886 and 1887. That number declined again to just 57 students at the start of the academic year of 1887 and 1888. Eventually, at the start of the 1889 academic year, the school discontinued its upper-level classes. McGurk's tenure as president and pastor came to an end on November 18, 1890, and he was succeeded by Cornelius Gillespie.

From 1890 to 1893, McGurk engaged in pastoral work in Boston.

== College of the Holy Cross ==
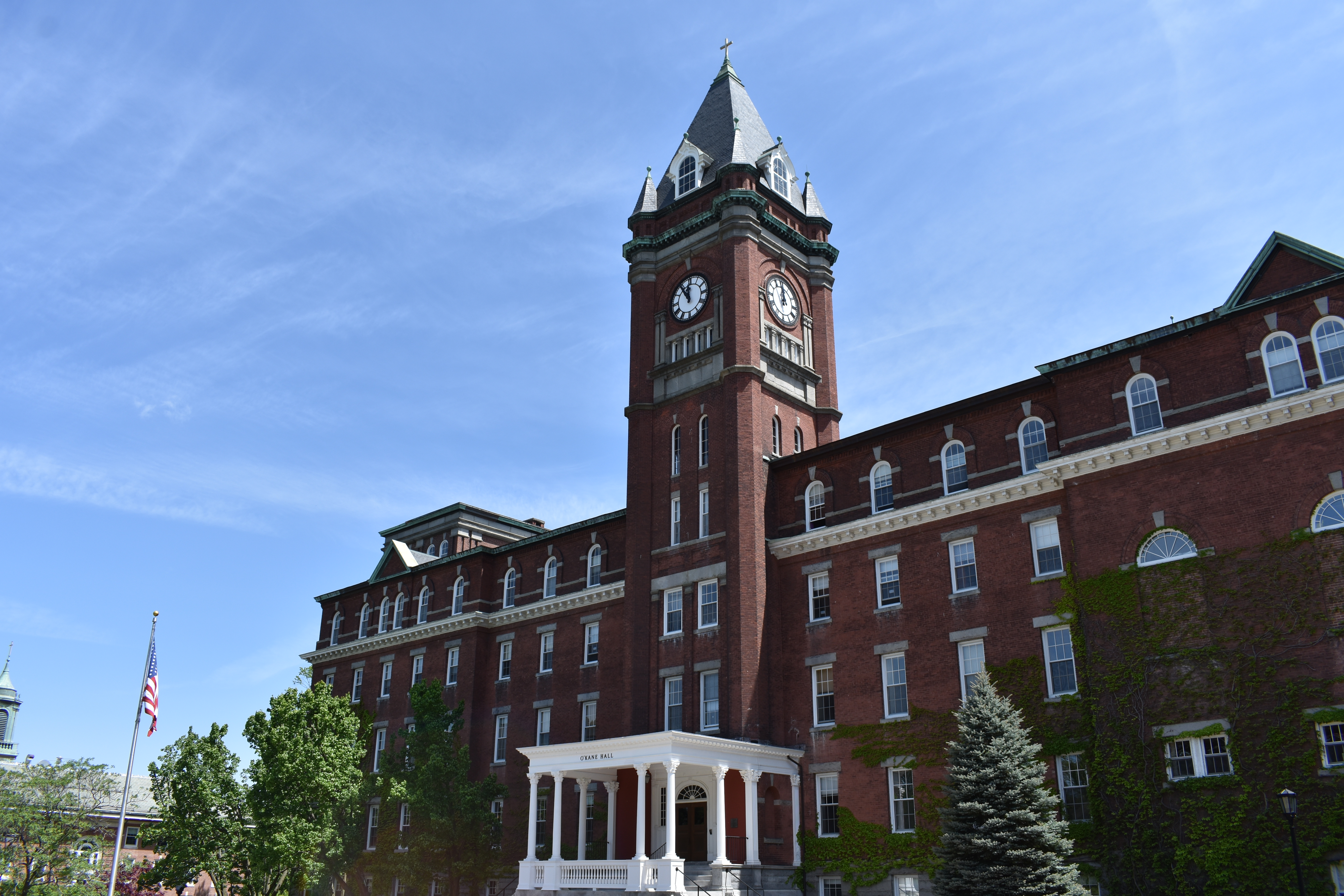
McGurk oversaw the construction of O'Kane Hall.

Dissatisfied with Michael O'Kane's performance as the president of the College of the Holy Cross, the Jesuit provincial superior, Thomas J. Campbell, appointed McGurk in 1893 to replace him, given McGurk's experience as an administrator. During his tenure, he disbanded the college's varsity football team in 1894 because he did not want it to play outside of Worcester.

In 1890, O'Kane had begun construction on a new building, without permission from the Jesuit superiors, to accommodate the school's growing student body. When they discovered this, the superiors ordered that work be paused. During McGurk's presidency, the consultors (Note: A consultor is an important advisor to the provincial superior.) of the Jesuit province determined that the school would have to take on $150,000 of debt to complete construction. The superiors eventually approved the completion of the exterior only, and work on the building resumed in 1894. McGurk attempted to raise funds for its completion.

Around this time, McGurk's health began to deteriorate, and he took several leaves of absence to recuperate. He spent some time at Keyser Island in Connecticut and then three months in Europe. He continued to petition the Jesuit Superior General for permission to take on additional debt to complete the building, which stood unfinished for two years. McGurk eventually received permission and was directed to borrow from other Jesuit institutions, rather than from banks. In January 1895, he established a fundraising committee and had students raise funds for gymnasium equipment. In April 1895, the new building was officially dedicated and was named O'Kane Hall. Measuring 220 feet (67 m) long, 110 feet (34 m) wide, and 95 feet (29 m) tall, it substantially relieved overcrowding at the college. It contained a swimming pool, gymnasium, running track, the president's office, laboratories, classrooms, a museum, a library, dormitories, and an 800-seat theater. In total, the building cost $182,000, and brought the college's total debt to a high of $187,000 in 1894, equivalent to approximately $6.05 million in 2024.

During the graduation ceremony of 1895, while trying to resume the exercises indoors after it had begun to rain, McGurk suffered a stroke. He survived the event but remained in very poor health. On July 3, 1896, at approximately 5:50 p.m., McGurk died at St. Theresa's, the Jesuit retreat house and villa in Fairhaven, Massachusetts, on what is now Pope Beach on Sconticut Neck. He was the first Jesuit to die at that institution. He was buried at the College of the Holy Cross cemetery. John F. Lehy was appointed vice rector of the college until a new president could be chosen.

== Notes ==
Academic offices
| Preceded by Stephen A. Kelly | 8th President of Loyola College in Maryland; 1877–1885 | Succeeded by Franics Smith |
| Preceded by John J. Murphy | 16th President of Gonzaga College; 1885–1890 | Succeeded by Cornelius Gillespie |
| Preceded by Michael O'Kane | 15th President of the College of the Holy Cross; 1893–1895 | Succeeded by John F. Lehy |
Catholic Church titles
| Preceded by Stephen A. Kelly | 7th Pastor of St. Ignatius Church; 1877–1885 | Succeeded by Franics Smith |
| Preceded by John J. Murphy | 15th Pastor of St. Aloysius Church; 1885–1890 | Succeeded by Cornelius Gillespie |
