= Georgetown Center for Liturgy =

The Georgetown Center for Liturgy, founded in 1981 by Georgetown University and Holy Trinity Catholic Church, was an education, research, and consultation center dedicated to transforming American Catholic parishes through the liturgical renewal initiated by the Second Vatican Council. The Center for Liturgy offered a range of quality national and regional programs and conducted parish liturgical missions, training days and consultations. The center is no longer in operation.

== History ==
In 1981 Fr. Timothy Healy, S.J., then president of Georgetown University, and Fr. Al Panuska, S.J., the Provincial of the Maryland Province, recognized the need for specialized centers to assist the American Catholic Church with the implementation of the liturgical reforms initiated by the Second Vatican Council. This prompted Fathers Healy and Panuska to establish The Georgetown Center for Liturgy, Spirituality and the Arts (later known as The Georgetown Center for Liturgy), a unique joint project of Georgetown University and its neighbor, Holy Trinity Catholic Church. Being rooted in both a university and a parish assured that the center's work would be supported by the strength of the university's resources and educational expertise and informed by the actual pastoral experiences of a parish.

Fr. Lawrence J. Madden, S.J., who held a doctorate in liturgical studies from the University of Trier, Germany, was selected to head up the project. Father Madden had been Director of Campus Ministry and a member of the Theology Faculty at Georgetown University for the preceding ten years. Upon becoming Director of the new Center for Liturgy, Father Madden also became an associate pastor of Holy Trinity parish; later he served as pastor. His participation in the life of the parish helped to shape the overall mission of the center as one concerned not only with the theoretical dimension of liturgy but also with congregational praxis.

Under Madden's direction, the Center for Liturgy became a nationally known and widely respected education, research, and consultation center whose primary focus was to ensure the quality of Roman Catholic worship in the United States. Madden was also on the governing board of the Catholic Coalition on Preaching. Paul F. X. Corvino served as associate director.

Since the Second Vatican Council, remarkable strides have been made in the renewal of Catholic liturgy, including the use of the vernacular in the liturgy, the involvement of the laity, the greater role of Scripture in Catholic worship, and the composition of new music to enhance the celebration of the reformed rites. On the other hand, the shortage of priests has led to the creation of larger and larger churches, which can house more people for fewer Masses. Madden noted, “It takes a tremendous amount of skill for somebody to lead 1,200 people as opposed to 700 and the feel is very different to the assembly.”

Madden devoted much of his priestly ministry to helping parishes celebrate the liturgy well. His calming influence as Holy Trinity's pastor in the 1990s is credited with defusing tension (much of it involving liturgical issues) between the Jesuit-run parish and the Washington archdiocese. Father Madden died of a heart attack May 29, 2011 at Georgetown University.

== Programs ==
The staff undertook research projects, published regularly in liturgical and pastoral journals, and offered courses at Georgetown University. Among the programs offers by the Center for Liturgy were:

- "Leading from the Heart", a long-distance learning program for presiders and preachers that integrated ritual studies, theology and spirituality, and developed performance capacity; the distance learning program included "coaches" to assist the learner in building practical competency in their role.
- Study Tours Abroad: The Center conducted annual liturgical study tours led by GCL staff, which explored the intersection between liturgy, art, and architecture. Tour locations included Rome in 2007 and 2008, and Amsterdam and Brussels in 2008.
- Conferences
  - Northeast Liturgical Conference (2003)
  - Liturgy-Justice Colloquium (2003)
  - The Joseph Campbell Phenomenon (1991)
  - Twenty-Five Years Since the Constitution on the Sacred Liturgy (1988)
  - Form/Reform (1986–2006)
  - Talks and Retreats on liturgy, spirituality, and parish life.
- Advent Celebration: Each December the Georgetown Center for Liturgy hosted an Advent Celebration which included a Eucharistic Celebration and Reception, and the presentation of an annual Award for Outstanding Contributions Made to the Liturgical Life of the American Church.

== EnVision Church ==
EnVisionChurch was the center's interactive online resource for liturgy and spirituality. It offered articles on sacred art and architecture, seasonal worship environments, places of spirit, and liturgy. These articles, written by professionals in each field, provide insight and advice for those interested in the intersections between liturgy, theology, spirituality, sacred art and architecture.

In addition to its information resources, EnVisionChurch was also a forum for learning, sharing, networking, and conversation among professionals who assist faith communities with building and/or renovating places of worship and with commissioning artwork; parish leaders, building/renovation committees, parishioners engaged in liturgical ministries (including art and environment committees), and facility/maintenance staff; and diocesan building/renovation and facilities commissions and offices.

It hosted a gallery of images, a library of resources, and a catalog of professionals. Although the Center for Liturgy no longer operates, the Georgetown University Library continues to provide the platform for hosting the "Rev. Paul Cioffi, S.J Images Collection" of approximately 3,000 photographs of early Christian sites and places of worship in Europe and North America.

== Georgetown Center for Liturgy staff publications ==
- Sunday Mass: Our Role and Why it Matters - Anne Y. Koester
- Liturgy and Justice: To Worship God in Spirit and Truth - Anne Y. Koester, editor
- Called To Participate: Theological, Ritual, And Social Perspectives - by Mark Searle, edited by Barbara Searle and Anne Y. Koester
- Vision: The Scholarly Contributions of Mark Searle to Liturgical Renewal - Anne Y. Koester and Barbara Searle, editors
- Celebrating Marriage: Preparing the Wedding Liturgy -- Workbook for Engaged Couples, Third Edition - Paul Covino, John Buscemi, Dr. Elaine Rendler, Lawrence Madden, S.J.
- The Joseph Campbell Phenomenon - Lawrence Madden, S.J.
- The Awakening Church - Lawrence J. Madden, S.J., editor
