= John E. Brooks =

American theologian and Jesuit priest (1923–2012)

John E. Brooks SJ
- Brooks in 1971

29th President of the College of the Holy Cross
- In office May 1970 – April 1994
- Preceded by: Raymond J. Swords
- Succeeded by: Gerard Reedy

Personal details
- Born: July 13, 1923 Dorchester, Massachusetts, U.S.
- Died: July 2, 2012 (aged 88) Worcester, Massachusetts, U.S.
- Education: College of the Holy Cross (BS); Boston College (MA, MS); Pontifical Gregorian University (STD)

Military service
- Branch/service: United States Army Signal Corps
- Years of service: 1943–1946
- Battles/wars: World War II; Western Front; Battle of the Bulge

John Edward Brooks SJ (July 13, 1923 – July 2, 2012) was an American theologian and Jesuit priest who served as the 29th president of the College of the Holy Cross from 1970 to 1994. His tenure of 24 years remains the longest in the college's history.

After serving in the U.S. Army in the Western Front during World War II, Brooks graduated with a bachelor's degree in physics from Holy Cross in 1949. He joined the Society of Jesus in 1950, studied philosophy and geophysics at Boston College, and earned his doctorate in sacred theology from Pontifical Gregorian University in 1963. After receiving his doctorate, he returned to teach as a professor at Holy Cross. He became the chairman of its theology department in 1964 and was named the college's dean in 1968.

Brooks was elected the president of the College of the Holy Cross in 1970. He played a prominent role in efforts to diversify the college, helping to recruit African-American students to the college in the late 1960s, including Clarence Thomas and Theodore Wells. As president, he oversaw a transition to coeducation, substantial growth in the college's endowment and physical campus, and the expansion of its academic programs. He also supported reforms intended to place greater emphasis on academics in intercollegiate athletics, including Holy Cross's participation in the Patriot League.

== Early life and education ==
Brooks was born on July 13, 1923, in Dorchester, Massachusetts, to John E. Brooks Sr. and Mildred (McCoy) Brooks, and was the oldest of four children. He was raised in the West Roxbury neighborhood of Boston. His father was a divisional manager for the New England Telephone Company.

Brooks attended Boston Latin School, after which he enrolled at the College of the Holy Cross in the fall of 1942. In 1943, during World War II, he volunteered for service in the United States Army and trained in the Signal Corps, taking a leave from college after his first semester. He subsequently served in the campaigns in Northern France, the Rhineland, the Ardennes, and Central Europe before being discharged from the Army in January 1946. During his service in Europe, he spent several months operating a communications repeater station in rural France that helped maintain communications for George S. Patton, and was present at the Battle of the Bulge.

Following his military service, Brooks returned to Holy Cross, where he studied geophysics with the intention of pursuing a career in oil exploration. He graduated from Holy Cross with a Bachelor of Science in physics in 1949. As an undergraduate, he was a member of the Knights of Columbus and wrote a senior thesis titled, "The Microwave Repeater." After graduating, Brooks pursued graduate studies in geophysics at Pennsylvania State University. As a graduate student, he applied to join the Society of Jesus; Brooks later recalled that the Jesuits initially instructed him to finish graduate school, but unexpectedly called him to enter the order early in 1950. He entered the Jesuits' New England Province that year. As part of his Jesuit formation, Brooks studied philosophy at Boston College, where he earned a Master of Arts in philosophy in 1954. He then returned to Holy Cross, where he began teaching mathematics and physics.

In 1956, Brooks began studying theology at the Weston School of Theology and was ordained to the priesthood on June 13, 1959, by Richard Cardinal Cushing, the archbishop of Boston. He subsequently completed a year of ascetical theology at the Jesuit tertianship in Pomfret, Connecticut, and earned a second master's degree, a Master of Science in geophysics, from Boston College. He was then assigned to graduate study in theology at the Pontifical Gregorian University in Rome, where he earned a Doctor of Sacred Theology in 1963 during the early years of the Second Vatican Council. His doctoral dissertation was titled, The Concept of Sin as an "Offensa Dei" in the Writings of St. Thomas Aquinas.

== Theology professor, 1963–1970 ==
After completing his doctoral studies in Rome, Brooks joined the faculty of the College of the Holy Cross, where he taught theology. As a professor, he often used the Bible as a starting point for classroom discussions of contemporary issues, including war and popular culture, and expected students to challenge themselves intellectually even when they struggled with the material. He was named chair of the theology department in 1964. He made his final vows as a Jesuit in August 1966.

As department chair, Brooks became involved in a dispute over the hiring of non-Catholic scholars to teach theology at Holy Cross. He defended the appointments and argued that the theology department's role within the college was to study religion as an academic component of a liberal arts education rather than to provide confessional instruction in Catholic doctrine, which he regarded as primarily the responsibility of chaplains and other pastoral personnel.

Brooks also became involved in efforts to increase African-American enrollment at Holy Cross. In the fall of 1967, he and another Jesuit, John Gallagher, traveled to Catholic high schools in Philadelphia in search of prospective Black students. Following the assassination of Martin Luther King Jr. in April 1968, Brooks pressed college president Raymond J. Swords for permission to undertake another recruitment effort and to offer admission and financial aid to qualified students despite the lateness of the admissions cycle. Initially, Brooks personally paid recruitment expenses out-of-pocket. Nineteen new African-American students enrolled at Holy Cross in the fall of 1968, receiving approximately $35,000 in financial aid. Among those recruited by Brooks were U.S. Supreme Court justice Clarence Thomas, novelist Edward P. Jones, trial lawyer Theodore V. Wells Jr., and professional football player Ed Jenkins.

In the summer of 1968, Brooks was appointed vice president for academic affairs and dean of the college. During the 1968–69 academic year, Brooks, Swords, dean of students John Shay, and psychology professor Paul Rosenkrantz met regularly with Black students to discuss their experiences and concerns. As dean, Brooks also remained involved in teaching and religious affairs while advising student leaders and students experiencing academic or personal difficulties. He was also an advocate of recruiting Black faculty members and diversifying the curriculum as a response to racial inequality.

== President of Holy Cross, 1970–1994 ==
=== Early presidency and coeducation, 1970–1972 ===
On May 25, 1970, the board of trustees of Holy Cross selected Brooks to succeed Swords as president after a search in which the final candidates were Brooks and Raymond Baumhart, the executive vice president of Loyola University Chicago. He assumed the presidency at age 46.

At the beginning of his presidency, Holy Cross faced unresolved disputes over coeducation and athletic scholarships, continuing activism associated with the civil rights movement and the Vietnam War, and a financial crisis that had produced five consecutive deficit budgets. Brooks declined a proposal to divide presidential responsibilities between a president and chancellor, preferring to retain responsibility for both the college's internal and external affairs, although he appointed Joseph Donahue, S.J., executive vice president to share the administrative workload. Cost reductions and increased revenues produced a balanced budget during Brooks's first year as president, and the college again balanced its budget the following year.

On January 11, 1971, Brooks announced the college's transition to coeducation and the trustees' decision to admit full-time resident women students beginning in the fall of 1972 without increasing the total size of the student body. The first women matriculated in September 1972 as members of the Class of 1976 and as second- and third-year transfer students. Coeducation doubled the college's applicant pool and was accompanied by an increase in the academic qualifications of entering students: 50 percent of the Class of 1974 had ranked in the top fifth of their high-school classes, compared with 71.5 percent of the Class of 1976.

Under Brooks, the theology department was renamed the Department of Religious Studies in 1972.

=== Institutional development, 1973–1981 ===
In 1973, Brooks appointed Francis X. Miller, S.J., vice president for development and college relations; during Miller's first year, alumni participation in annual giving reached 33 percent and the Holy Cross Fund exceeded $1 million for the first time.

Amid racial tensions on campus in 1977, Brooks wrote to the college community that the tensions were "deeply rooted in racism", which he characterized as "the most destructive sin", and his administration took steps to recruit Black faculty, hire a Black admissions counselor, and increase funding for the Black Student Union.

After the Holy Cross Fund passed $2 million in 1979, the college launched a capital campaign seeking $20 million, including $14.5 million for the endowment. The campaign ultimately raised nearly $23 million, while the endowment increased from $7.9 million in 1979 to $27.7 million in 1983. Alumni participation in annual giving surpassed 50 percent in 1981 and remained above 55 percent between 1983 and 1994.

=== College expansion and athletic reform, 1982–1989 ===
Beginning in the early 1980s, Brooks and the trustees had explored a closer athletic relationship with the Ivy League. By 1983, Holy Cross was participating in plans for a new athletic conference with institutions whose academic standards and approach to athletics were intended to be compatible with those of the Ivy schools. Brooks defended the emerging Colonial League on the grounds that athletes should be academically representative of the wider student body and that academic considerations should take precedence over commercialized intercollegiate athletics.

Brooks also oversaw efforts to expand and renovate large parts of the campus. An addition to the Hart Recreation Center opened in 1983 with facilities including a swimming pool, rowing tank, locker and physical-therapy areas, and squash and handball courts. The Iris and B. Gerald Cantor Art Gallery also opened in 1983. The college completed the $10.5 million Swords Hall science building in 1985, providing classrooms, laboratories, a greenhouse, a science library, and expanded facilities for mathematics and biology.

The first Colonial League football game at Fitton Field was played against Lehigh in September 1986. The college introduced a theatre major in 1987. Edith Stein Hall, an $8 million classroom and office building housing economics, modern languages and literature, and religious studies, opened in 1988. Holy Cross agreed that incoming football players would receive need-based rather than athletic aid beginning in 1989. By that year, the college's endowment had reached $79.9 million.

=== Final years, 1990–1994 ===
After a racist threat against two Black students in 1992, Brooks established a Task Force on Race and Gender to advise him on diversity, campus violence, and responses to racist and sexist acts. During the same period, the college expanded institutional support for Hispanic and Asian students and created an administrative position devoted to multicultural affairs, minority recruitment, retention, and adjustment to college life.

The final major fundraising campaign of Brooks's presidency was organized in conjunction with the college's 1993–94 sesquicentennial. The campaign raised $76.6 million against a $60 million goal, and by its conclusion the endowment exceeded $150 million. Other late projects included the Millard Art Center and the conversion of the former Fenwick chapel into a concert and convocation hall, completed in 1994 and named in Brooks's honor.

Brooks announced his intention to leave the presidency on June 21, 1993, during Holy Cross's sesquicentennial year. He made his final appearance as president before the Faculty-Student Assembly in April 1994, and Gerard Reedy was selected as his successor. Brooks thereafter remained at Holy Cross as president emeritus and Loyola Professor of Humanities. He continued teaching after his presidency, including a seminar in Christology.

== Death ==
After being treated for lymphoma at the University of Massachusetts Memorial Medical Center-University Worcester Campus, Brooks died on July 2, 2012, at age 88.
