= Michael O'Kane =

Irish Jesuit priest (1849–1917)

The Reverend Michael O'Kane SJ

14th President of the College of the Holy Cross
- In office 1889–1893
- Preceded by: Samuel Cahill
- Succeeded by: Edward A. McGurk

Personal details
- Born: July 12, 1849 Ennis, County Clare, Ireland
- Died: December 26, 1917 (aged 68) Worcester, Massachusetts, U.S.
- Resting place: College of the Holy Cross Cemetery
- Education: College of the Holy Cross; Woodstock College

Orders
- Ordination: 1882 by James Gibbons

Michael A. O'Kane SJ (July 12, 1849 – December 26, 1917) was an American Catholic priest and Jesuit who was the president of the College of the Holy Cross from 1889 to 1893. Born in Ireland, he emigrated to the United States as an infant and was raised in Massachusetts. He attended the College of the Holy Cross before entering the Society of Jesus in 1867. He then studied and later taught philosophy at Jesuit institutions.

As president of the college, he oversaw construction of Fenwick Hall and an athletic field. After four years, he left and spent the rest of his life engaged in missionary and pastoral work, including as the rector of St. Joseph's Church in Philadelphia from 1910 to 1912.

== Early life ==
O'Kane was born on July 12, 1849, in Ennis, County Clare, Ireland. He emigrated to the United States at the age of three months with his parents, where they settled in Spencer, Massachusetts. O'Kane was educated in Spencer, before enrolling at the College of the Holy Cross in Worcester in 1865. After two years, he decided to enter the Society of Jesus, and proceeded to the novitiate in Frederick, Maryland, on July 31, 1867.

== Jesuit formation ==
O'Kane spent two years at the novitiate studying the classics before beginning his philosophical studies at Woodstock College. After three years, in 1874, he became a teacher at Georgetown University in Washington, D.C. Four years later, he left and taught at Loyola College in Maryland for one year.

In 1879, O'Kane returned to Woodstock for his theological studies, where he was ordained a priest by the Archbishop of Baltimore, James Gibbons, in 1882. Afterwards, he returned to Georgetown for three years, where he held the positions of minister, prefect of studies, and professor of philosophy. In 1886, he completed his tertianship year at the Frederick novitiate. On August 26, 1887, he was appointed to succeed Archibald J. Tisdall as the master of novices and the rector of St. Stanislaus novitiate in Frederick, a position he held for two years until he was succeeded by James A. Ward as vice (acting) rector. O'Kane professed his fourth vow in the Jesuit order on August 15, 1888.

== College of the Holy Cross ==
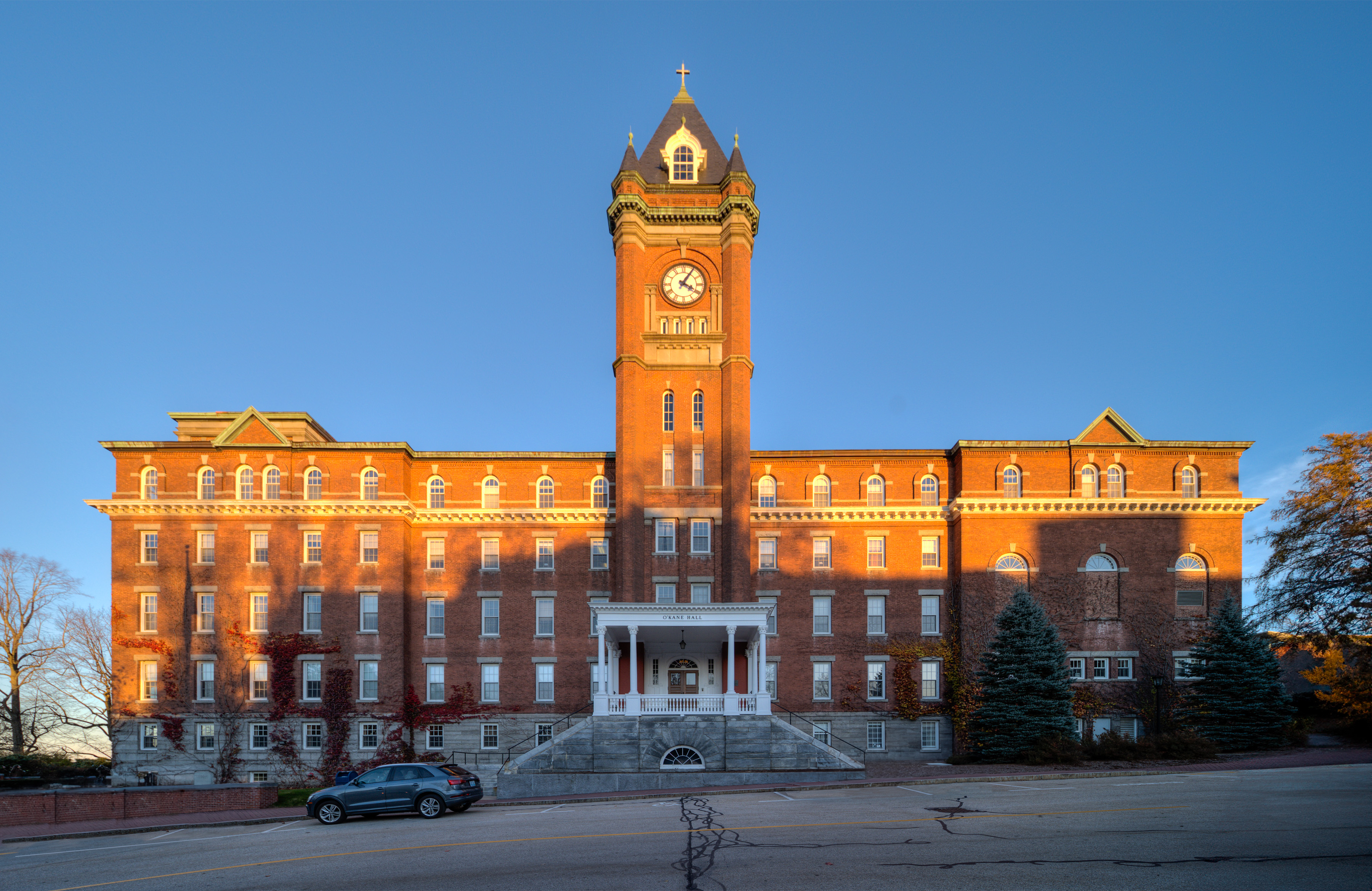
O'Kane oversaw the start of construction on what would become known as O'Kane Hall.

In 1889, O'Kane succeeded Samuel Cahill as the president of the College of the Holy Cross. From 1887 to 1892, including during O'Kane's presidency, student enrollment increased significantly from less than 200 to more than 300. This left the college overcrowded, requiring O'Kane to turn away some prospective students, divide classes, and hold some classes at night. As a result, revenues increased. In January 1890, O'Kane revived plans begun under Edward D. Boone to construct a new building. By 1891, construction was underway. The new building was built as an extension of Fenwick Hall.

O'Kane, however, had not yet obtained formal approval for construction from the Jesuit Superior General, who had been forced out of Rome, to Fiesole. In March 1892, the Jesuit provincial superior, Thomas J. Campbell, ordered O'Kane to halt all work until the Superior General approved the project. In 1893, the college constructed an athletic field using the earth excavated during the construction of the new building.

By this time, the Jesuit superiors had begun to view O'Kane's leadership unfavorably. In addition to the building controversy, others had complained that O'Kane had not responded to or was late in responding to matters. Campbell decided that O'Kane should be replaced and selected Edward A. McGurk, who became president in 1893. Partial completion of the building was approved that same year, and full completion was approved in 1894.

O'Kane's successor, McGurk resumed work on the new building, which opened on April 25, 1895, and became known as O'Kane Hall. It measured 139 feet (42 m) by 50 feet (15 m). The building contained the school library until the construction of Dinand Library. The basement contained a recreation room and gymnasium, including an elevated track and a swimming pool. The upper floors contained the rector's office, laboratories, a museum, classrooms, dormitories, and an 800-person theater. In total, the building cost $182,000 (equivalent to approximately $5.95 million in 2024), which put the college in significant debt.

== Later years ==
In 1893, O'Kane joined the Jesuits' missionary band. From then until 1906, he led parish missions and retreats. In 1906, O'Kane's health deteriorated, and he ceased his missionary work. He worked for three years at the Church of the Immaculate Conception in Boston.

In 1909, O'Kane began work at St. Joseph's Church in Philadelphia, and from 1910 to 1912, he was rector of the church. In 1912, he transferred to the Church of the Gesú in Philadelphia, where he remained until 1917. While in Philadelphia, he ministered to the prisoners at Eastern State Penitentiary. In 1917, he baptized fifteen prisoners who converted to Catholicism. That year, O'Kane traveled to Worcester for two weeks to celebrate his 50th anniversary in the Society of Jesus. While there, he became ill and died on December 26 at Saint Vincent Hospital.

O'Kane's funeral was held on December 28 at the College of the Holy Cross, and he was buried at the college's cemetery.

Academic offices
Preceded by Archibald J. Tisdall	8th Rector of St. Stanislaus Novitiate; 1887–1889	Succeeded by James A. Ward as Vice Rector
Preceded by Samuel Cahill	14th President of the College of the Holy Cross; 1889–1893	Succeeded by Edward A. McGurk
Catholic Church titles
Preceded by Archibald J. Tisdall	19th Master of Novices of the Jesuit Maryland-New York Province; 1889–1893	Succeeded by James A. Ward
Preceded by –	Pastor of St. Joseph's Church; 1910–1912	Succeeded by –
