= List of presidents of the College of the Holy Cross =

The following is a chronological list of presidents of the College of the Holy Cross:

No.	Image	Name	Position(s)	Joined College	Ascended presidency	Left/retired	Reference
1		Thomas F. Mulledy SJ	President	1843	1843	1845	
2		James A. Ryder SJ	President		1845	1848	
3		John Early SJ	President		1848	1851	
4		Anthony F. Ciampi SJ	President		1851	1854	
5		Peter J. Blenkinsop SJ	President		1854	1857	
6		Anthony F. Ciampi SJ	President		1857	1861	
7		James Clark SJ	President		1861	1867	
8		Robert W. Brady SJ	President		1867	1869	
9		Anthony F. Ciampi SJ	President		1869	1873	
10		Joseph B. O'Hagan SJ	President		1873	1878	
11		Edward D. Boone SJ	President		1878	1883	
12		Robert W. Brady SJ	President		1883	1887	
13		Samuel Cahill SJ	President		1887	1889	
14		Michael O'Kane SJ	President		1889	1893	
15		Edward A. McGurk SJ	President		1893	1895	
16		John F. Lehy SJ	President		1895	1901	
17		Joseph F. Hanselman SJ	President		1901	1906	
18		Thomas E. Murphy SJ	President		1906	1911	
19		Joseph N. Dinand SJ	President		1911	1918	
20		James J. Carlin SJ	President		1918	1924	
21		Joseph N. Dinand SJ	President		1924	1927	
22		John M. Fox SJ	President		1927	1933	
23		Francis J. Dolan SJ	President		1933	1939	
24		Joseph R. N. Maxwell SJ	President		1939	1945	
25		William J. Healy SJ	President		1945	1948	
26		John A. O'Brien SJ	President		1948	1954	
27		William A. Donaghy SJ	President		1954	1960	
28		Raymond J. Swords SJ	President		1960	1970	
29		John E. Brooks SJ	President		1970	1994	
30		Gerard Reedy SJ	President		1994	1998	
—		Frank Vellaccio	Acting President		1998	2000	
31		Michael C. McFarland SJ	President		2000	2012	
32		Philip Boroughs SJ	President		2012	2021	
33		Vincent Rougeau	President		2021		
