= Samuel Cahill =

The Reverend Samuel Cahill
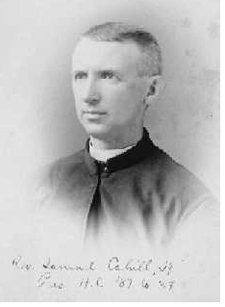

Vice President of Georgetown University
- In office 1905–1906

10th President of the College of the Holy Cross
- In office 1887–1889
- Preceded by: Robert W. Brady
- Succeeded by: Michael O'Kane

Personal details
- Born: 24 July 1844 Ireland
- Died: 25 October 1910 (age 66) Philadelphia, Pennsylvania, United States
- Education: Woodstock College
- Occupation: Jesuit priest; academic

Samuel Cahill (24 July 1844 – 25 October 1910) was an American Roman Catholic Jesuit priest and academic. He served as President of the College of the Holy Cross from 1887 to 1889.

== Biography ==
=== Early life and education ===
Cahill was born in Ireland on 24 July 1844 but moved to the United States with his parents as a young child. He entered the Society of Jesus in 1868 at Frederick, Maryland. He studied philosophy and theology at Woodstock College and was ordained to the priesthood by Archbishop James Gibbons in 1880.

=== Career and later life ===
Cahill spent his early priesthood serving in parishes, including St. Ignatius Church in Baltimore.

Cahill held a series of administrative posts at Loyola College (now Loyola University Maryland), Saint Joseph's College (now Saint Joseph's University), Fordham University, and Boston College. In 1887, he was appointed President of the College of the Holy Cross, but resigned only two years later due to ill health. He went for health purposes to Colorado and New Mexico, where he worked as a laborer until 1897.

In 1905, he was appointed Vice President of Georgetown University, while at the same time working at Holy Trinity Church in Washington, D.C. His last appointment was Pastor of St. Joseph's Church in Philadelphia, Pennsylvania, where he died on 25 October 1910.
