= Stephen A. Kelly =

Irish-American Jesuit teacher (1833–1910)

The Reverend Stephen A. Kelly S.J.
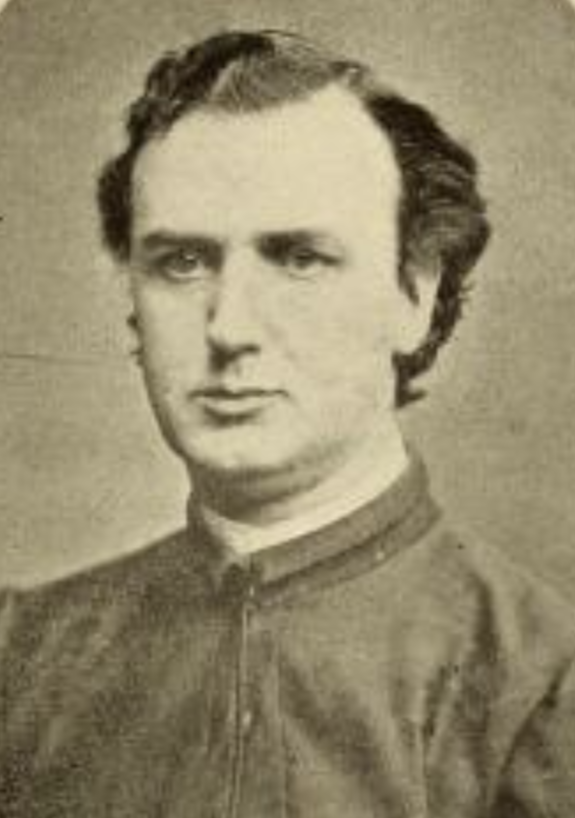

7th President of Loyola College in Maryland
- In office 1871–1877
- Preceded by: Edward Henchy
- Succeeded by: Edward A. McGurk

Personal details
- Born: December 26, 1833 Dublin, Ireland
- Died: February 13, 1910 (aged 76) Philadelphia, Pennsylvania, U.S.

Stephen A. Kelly, S.J. (December 26, 1833 – February 13, 1910) was an Irish-American Catholic priest and Jesuit.

== Early life ==
Stephen A. Kelly was born on December 26, 1833, in Dublin, in the United Kingdom of Great Britain and Ireland. He entered the Society of Jesus and proceeded to the Jesuit novitiate in Frederick, Maryland, US.

== Academic career ==
Kelly became a professor at Georgetown University and Gonzaga College in Washington, D.C. He then became the assistant superior of Woodstock College, before being appointed the President of Loyola College in Maryland and ex officio pastor of St. Ignatius Church in January 1871, succeeding Edward Henchy.

== Later years ==
In 1881, Kelly became the pastor of Holy Trinity Church in Washington, D.C. He died on February 13, 1910, at the rectory of Old St. Joseph's Church in Philadelphia, Pennsylvania.

Academic offices
Preceded by Edward Henchy	7th President of Loyola College in Maryland; 1871–1877	Succeeded by Edward A. McGurk
Catholic Church titles
Preceded by Edward Henchy	Pastor of St. Ignatius Church; 1871–1877	Succeeded by Edward A. McGurk
Preceded by Anthony F. Ciampi	26th Pastor of Holy Trinity Church; 1881–1890	Succeeded by Robert W. Brady
