= Edward Henchy =

American Catholic priest

The Reverend Edward Henchy

6th President of Loyola College in Maryland
- In office 1870–1871
- Preceded by: John Early
- Succeeded by: Stephen A. Kelly

Personal details
- Died: c. 1895 Eastern Shore of Maryland, U.S.
- Resting place: St. Peter's Church, Queenstown, Maryland

Edward Henchy (died c. 1895) was an American Catholic priest. For most of his career, he was a Jesuit, and ministered to mission parishes on the Eastern Shore of Maryland. In 1870, he became the president of Loyola College in Maryland, but resigned just six months later due to illness. He returned to his ministry work in eastern Maryland, but resigned from the Jesuit order, becoming a diocesan priest, because the eastern part of Maryland had been transferred from the Archdiocese of Baltimore, where the Jesuits operated, to the Diocese of Wilmington. He died there around 1895.

== Early life ==
Edward Henchy received his tonsure and minor orders from Michael Portier, the Bishop of Mobile, on June 21, 1855. He eventually became a Catholic priest and a member of the Society of Jesus.

He became the Jesuit mission priest at St. Joseph's Church in Cordova, Maryland, which served the rural Maryland counties of Talbot, Queen Anne's, Kent, Caroline, and Dorchester, as well as Kent and Sussex counties in Delaware as a priest from 1867 to 1870. While there, he organized the first St. Joseph's Jousting Tournament on August 26, 1868.

Henchy was appointed to succeed John Early in 1870 as president of Loyola College in Maryland and pastor of St. Ignatius Church. His presidency lasted only six months, however, as he became ill and retired in January 1871, and was succeeded by Stephen A. Kelly.

== Later ministry ==
He again returned to the areas of the Eastern Shore of Maryland, where he previously was a Jesuit missionary. However, in 1868, ecclesiastical jurisdiction over the part of Maryland east of the Chesapeake Bay region had been transferred from the Archdiocese of Baltimore, in which the Jesuits operated, to the newly erected Diocese of Wilmington. Therefore, in order to continue ministering to the Catholics there, he left the Society of Jesus, and became a diocesan priest. In this capacity, he ministered to the area again from 1874 to 1878, as the pastor of the Church of Saints Peter & Paul in Easton, Maryland.

He also served briefly as pastor of St. Joseph's on the Brandywine in Greenville, Delaware. Henchy died on the Eastern Shore around 1895. He was buried in St. Peter's Church in Queenstown, Maryland.

Academic offices
Preceded by John Early	6th President of Loyola College in Maryland; 1870—1871	Succeeded by Stephen A. Kelly
Catholic Church titles
Preceded by John Early	Pastor of St. Ignatius Church; 1870—1871	Succeeded by Stephen A. Kelly
