= Holy Trinity School (Washington, D.C.) =

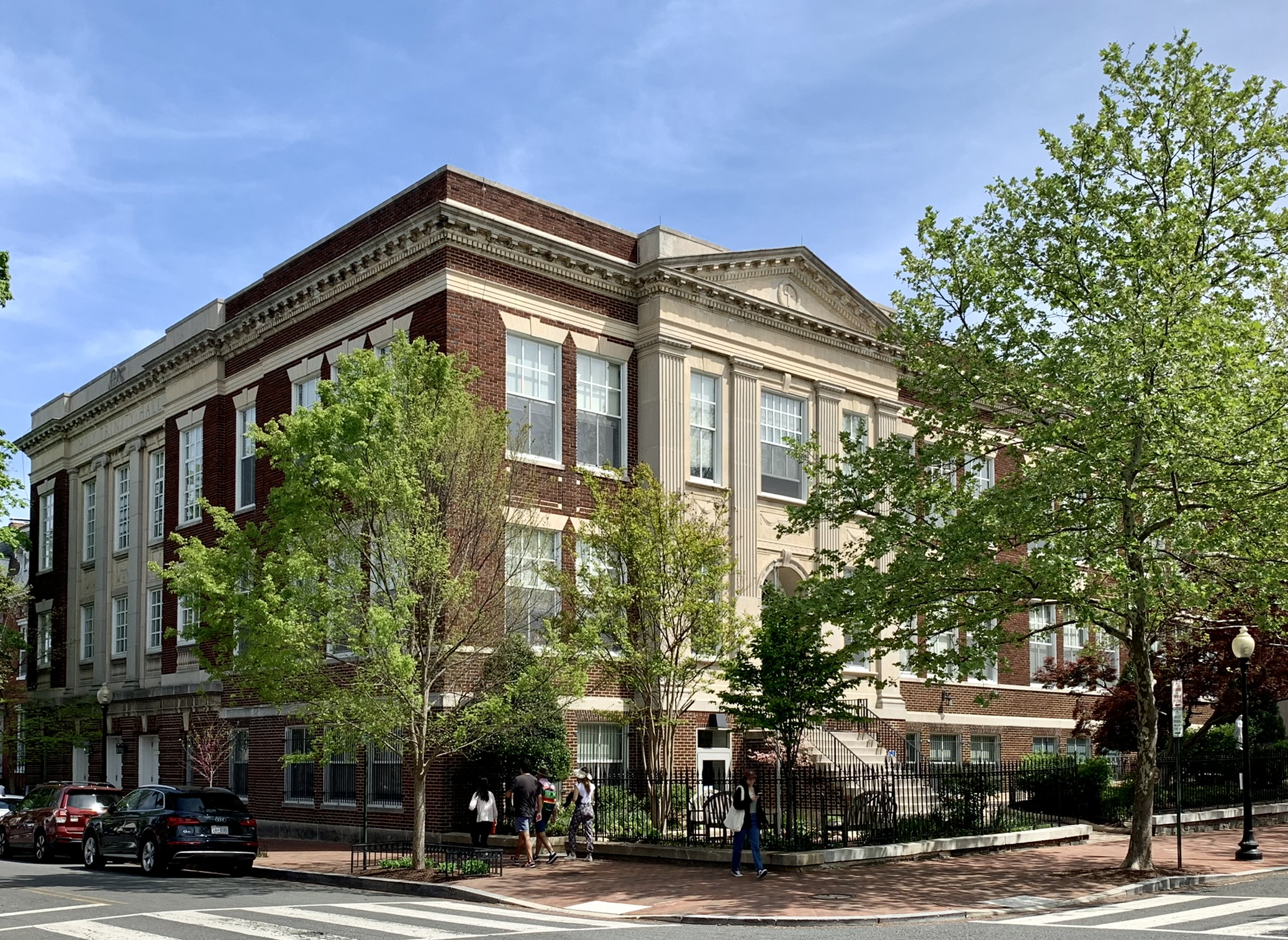
- Holy Trinity School in 2022

Location
- 1325 36th Street, NW; Washington, DC; United States
- Coordinates: 38.907567°N 77.069970°W

Information
- Motto: People for Others
- Religious affiliation: Catholic
- Established: 1818; 208 years ago
- Head of school: Katy Williams
- Faculty: 50
- Grades: PK-8
- Enrollment: 345
- Student to teacher ratio: 8:1
- Colors: Blue & White
- Website: htsdc.org

Holy Trinity School is a Jesuit-run Catholic elementary school located in the Georgetown neighborhood of Washington, DC. It is a ministry of Holy Trinity Catholic Church.

It is overseen by the Archdiocese of Washington.

== History ==
Holy Trinity was established as the first Catholic school in the District of Columbia in 1818 by Father John Ralphio lII. At the time, it served only boys. The school closed in 1829, but reopened in 1831. The high school division, opened in 1922, was closed in 1974 due to high operating costs.

In 2016, Holy Trinity was named a Blue Ribbon School by the U.S. Department of Education.

== Program ==
Pre-K through fourth grade students are housed in the lower school and fifth through eighth grade students are housed in the upper school. Holy Trinity School also added a house system that rewards students for good deeds and activities in House Meetings every other Friday. Spanish is offered in all grades.

Holy Trinity fields cross-country, softball, basketball, and track and field teams that play in the Archdiocese of Washington's Catholic Youth Organization. Students compete against teachers in an annual basketball game.

== Demographics ==
During the 2018-19 school year, Holy Trinity's 343 students were 78% white, 11% multiracial, 10% African American, 10% Hispanic, and 2% Asian. 89% were Catholic.
