= St. John's Catholic Church (Bangor, Maine) =

Historic church in Maine, United States

- U.S. National Register of Historic Places
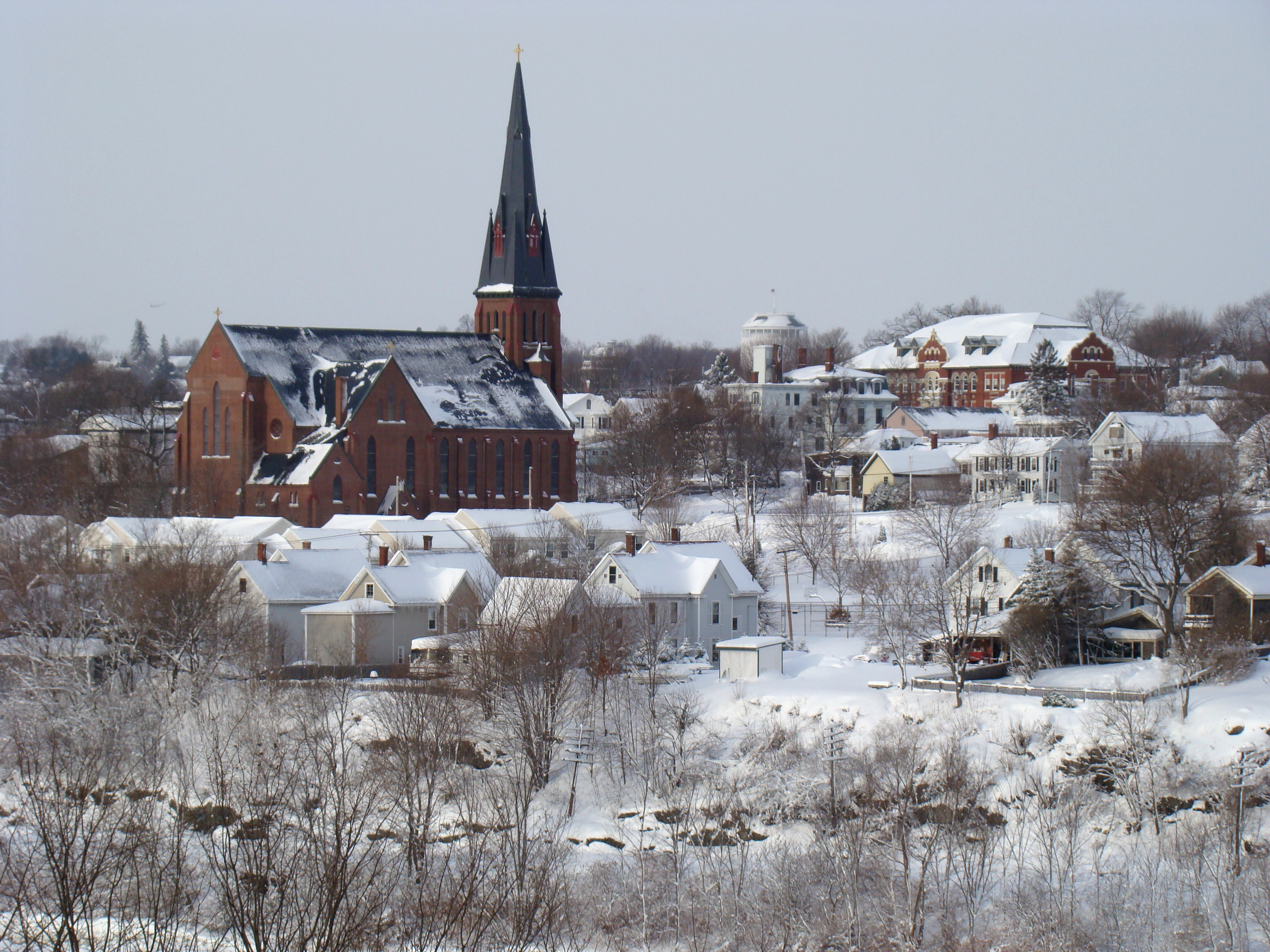

- Location within Maine Location within the United States
- Location: 217 York St., Bangor, Maine
- Coordinates: 44°48′13″N 68°45′40″W
- Area: less than one acre
- Built: 1855
- Architect: Patrick Charles Keely
- Architectural style: Gothic
- NRHP reference No.: 73000142
- Added to NRHP: April 02, 1973

St. John's Catholic Church is a historic church at 217 York Street in Bangor, Maine. Built in 1855 at the height of the anti-immigrant Know Nothing movement, it stands as a major symbol of the city's Irish-American heritage, and a high quality local example of Gothic Revival architecture. It was listed on the National Register of Historic Places in 1973.

== Description ==
The church is located on the south side of York Street, between Boyd and Newbury Streets, east of Bangor's central business district. It is a brick building with a cruciform plan, with a slate roof and a stone foundation. A tower 180 feet (55 m) in height projects slightly from the front (north) facade, with entrances at the tower's center and in the flanking walls, set in Gothic-arched openings. Buttresses reinforce the side walls and building corners.

The church interior is divided into a long nave, with transepts housing chapels at the sides. The supporting columns have capitals decorated with cherubim and foliage. The organ is an 1860 E. and G. G. Hook Opus 288 instrument, which was restored in 1981; there are fewer than 55 known three-manual E. & G. G. Hook organs remaining in existence today.

== History ==
The church was designed by New York City architect Patrick Charles Keely, and was built in 1855-56, during the tenure of Fr. Johannes Bapst. Its construction was done by primarily local Irish laborers during the anti-Irish anti-immigrant Know Nothing movement, which was then at its height. Security had to be posted at the construction site to guard against threats to destroy it.

The building today also houses the parish offices of St. Paul the Apostle Parish, which includes the church of St. John, as well as St. Mary's in Bangor, St. Joseph and St. Theresa of Avila in Brewer, St. Matthew in Hampden, and St. Gabriel in Winterport.

Former three-term Bangor Mayor Dennis Soucy founded his credit union, St. John's Credit Union, in the basement of the church in 1956 to serve its parishioners. Now known as Bangor Federal Credit Union, the credit union currently has more than 14,000 members, as of 2013.

== See also ==
- National Register of Historic Places listings in Penobscot County, Maine
