= Cornelius Gillespie =

American Jesuit educator

The Reverend Cornelius Gillespie
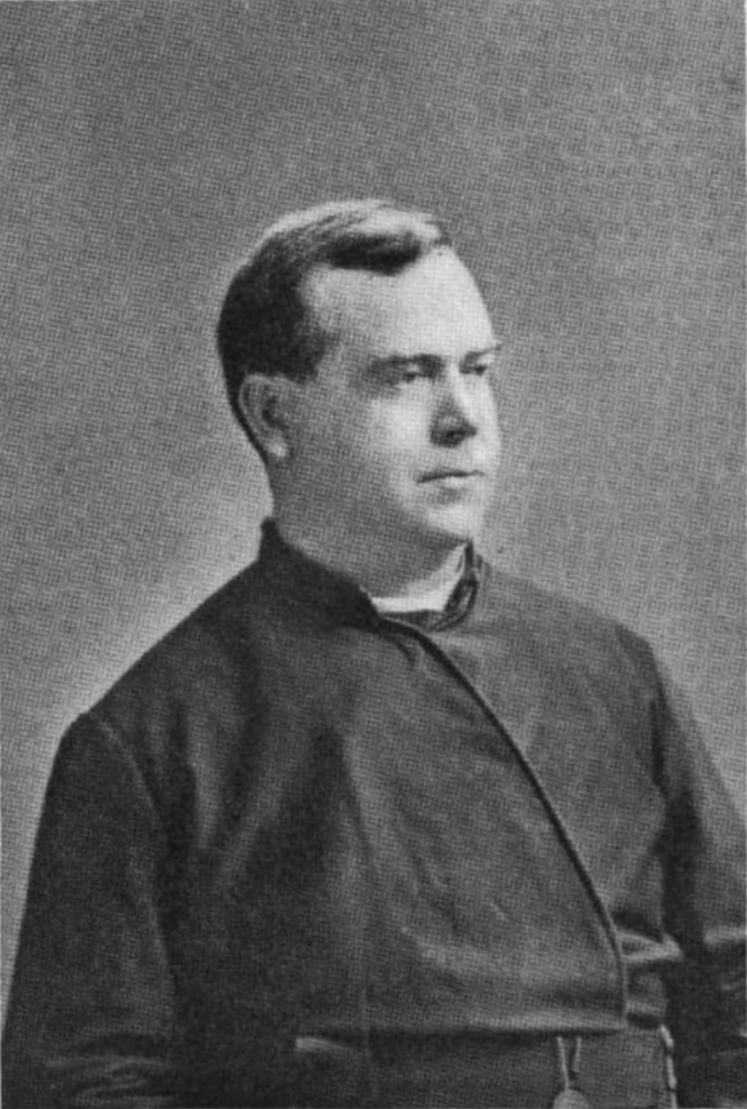
- Cornelius Gillespie

8th & 10th President of Saint Joseph's College
- In office 1908–1909
- Preceded by: Denis T. O'Sullivan
- Succeeded by: Charles W. Lyons
- In office 1900–1907
- Preceded by: William F. Clark
- Succeeded by: Denis T. O'Sullivan

Personal details
- Born: September 12, 1851 County Donegal, United Kingdom of Great Britain and Ireland
- Died: January 28, 1912 (aged 60) Baltimore, Maryland, U.S.
- Education: Saint Joseph's College

Orders
- Ordination: 1887

Cornelius Gillespie (September 12, 1851 – January 28, 1912) was an American Catholic priest and Jesuit who served as the president of Gonzaga College in Washington, D.C., and twice as president of Saint Joseph's College in Philadelphia. He was the first head of Saint Joseph's College to have been an alumnus of the school.

== Early life ==
Cornelius Gillespie was born on September 12, 1851, in County Donegal, located in what was then the United Kingdom of Great Britain and Ireland. He immigrated to the United States at the age of sixteen, and was accepted to Saint Joseph's College in Philadelphia; the school was officially closed while a new campus was being constructed, however, and he studied under one of the school's Jesuit professors. He entered the Society of Jesus, proceeding to its novitiate in Frederick, Maryland, in 1873. He then spent time as a missionary throughout the Eastern United States, and was ordained a priest in 1887. He then served for two years as the vice president of Georgetown University in Washington, D.C.

== Ministry and leadership ==
=== Gonzaga College ===
Gillespie was appointed the seventeenth president of Gonzaga College and pastor of St. Aloysius Church in Washington, D.C., succeeding Edward A. McGurk. He took office on November 18, 1890. As president, he announced on January 29, 1893, that a new building for the college would be built; three years later, the new hall was complete. A second building was erected, with the cornerstone being laid on May 24, 1896. The building was complete by October 1896. That year being the school's golden jubilee, Gillespie created the school's first alumni society. The first school musical band was organized that year as well. Gillespie's term as president and pastor came to an end in 1898, and he was succeeded by John F. Galligan.

=== Saint Joseph's College ===
Gillespie twice served as president of Saint Joseph's College in Philadelphia. He became the eighth president of the college on August 20, 1900, succeeding William F. Clark. He was the college's first president to have been an alumnus of the school, and served until September 1907, when he was replaced by Denis T. O'Sullivan. O'Sullivan died soon thereafter, and Gillespie again became the tenth president on June 16, 1908, serving until his health deteriorated. Charles W. Lyons was succeeded him on July 9, 1909, following year. In his two terms, Gillespie separated St. Joseph's Preparatory School from the rest of the university in 1904, and the first varsity athletics programs were begun in 1909.

Gillespie died on January 28, 1912, in St. Agnes Hospital in Baltimore. He was distantly related to Saint Joseph's University's future president, Kevin Gillespie.

Academic offices
Preceded by Denis T. O'Sullivan	10th President of Saint Joseph's College; 1908–1909	Succeeded by Charles W. Lyons
Preceded by William F. Clark	8th President of Saint Joseph's College; 1900–1907	Succeeded by Denis T. O'Sullivan
Preceded by Edward A. McGurk	17th President of Gonzaga College; 1890–1898	Succeeded by John F. Galligan
Catholic Church titles
Preceded by Edward A. McGurk	9th Pastor of St. Aloysius Church; 1890–1898	Succeeded by John F. Galligan
