= Peter J. Blenkinsop =

Irish-American Jesuit

The Reverend Peter J. Blenkinsop S.J.
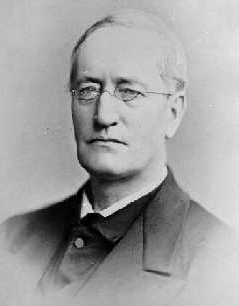

5th President of the College of the Holy Cross
- In office 1854–1857
- Preceded by: Anthony F. Ciampi
- Succeeded by: Anthony F. Ciampi

Personal details
- Born: April 19, 1818 Dublin, Ireland
- Died: November 5, 1896 (aged 78) Philadelphia, Pennsylvania, U.S.
- Relations: Euphemia Blenkinsop (sister)
- Education: St. Mary's College; Georgetown College

Orders
- Ordination: July 26, 1846 by Samuel Eccleston

Peter J. Blenkinsop, S.J. (April 19, 1818 – November 5, 1896) was an Irish American Catholic priest and Jesuit who was the president of the College of the Holy Cross from 1854 to 1857. After emigrating to the United States in 1826, he entered the Society of Jesus and studied for the priesthood. After the end of his presidency, he engaged in pastoral work in the Northeastern United States.

== Early life ==
Peter J. Blenkinsop was born on April 19, 1818, in Dublin, Ireland. He emigrated with his family to the United States in 1826 and enrolled at the preparatory division of St. Mary's College in Baltimore, Maryland, in 1830. In 1834, he entered the Society of Jesus and began his study of philosophy and theology at Georgetown College in 1838. His sister, Euphemia, would become the superior of the Sisters of Charity in Emmitsburg, Maryland.

At Georgetown, Blenkinsop also taught ethics. He was ordained a priest by Archbishop Samuel Eccleston of Baltimore on July 26, 1846.

== Holy Cross ==
Blenkinsop became the treasurer of the College of the Holy Cross in 1847. He remained in this position until his appointment as the president of the College of the Holy Cross on August 13, 1854, succeeding Anthony F. Ciampi. The college had been nearly completely destroyed by a fire on July 14, 1852, and continued the work of Ciampi to offset the significant financial costs of the rebuilding that occurred during his predecessor. During his tenure, the college also struggled to increase enrollment. His term as president came to an end in 1857, and Ciampi once again became president of the school.

== Later years ==
After leaving Holy Cross, Blenkinsop spent the rest of career engaged in pastoral work. He was stationed at Jesuit churches in Massachusetts, Pennsylvania, and Maryland, including for a time as pastor of St. John the Evangelist Church in Frederick, Maryland, and Old St. Joseph's Church in Philadelphia, Pennsylvania. He also spent time at the College of the Holy Cross, Georgetown College, and Saint Joseph's College.

Blenkinsop died on November 5, 1896, at the Church of the Gesú in Philadelphia.

Academic offices
Preceded by Anthony F. Ciampi	5th President of the College of the Holy Cross; 1854–1857	Succeeded by Anthony F. Ciampi
