= Edward D. Boone =

American Jesuit educator (1833–1916)

The Reverend Edward D. Boone SJ

11th President of the College of the Holy Cross
- In office 1878–1883
- Preceded by: Joseph B. O'Hagan
- Succeeded by: Robert W. Brady

Personal details
- Born: February 27, 1833 City of Washington, D.C., (Note: The District of Columbia was not consolidated into a single entity, Washington, D.C., until the passage of the Organic Act of 1871.) U.S.
- Died: January 16, 1916 (aged 82) Baltimore, Maryland, U.S.
- Resting place: Woodstock College cemetery
- Education: College of the Holy Cross (AB)

Orders
- Ordination: July 2, 1866 by Martin John Spalding

Edward D. Boone SJ (February 27, 1833 – January 16, 1916) was an American Catholic priest and Jesuit who was the president of the College of the Holy Cross from 1878 to 1883. Born in Washington, D.C., he graduated from Holy Cross in 1851 and entered the Society of Jesus the following year. Before becoming president, he taught at various Jesuit colleges. He spent the last twenty-five years of his life at Loyola College in Maryland and as a prison chaplain.

== Early life ==
Boone was born on February 27, 1833, in the City of Washington, in the District of Columbia, to an old Maryland family. His father, John, was a graduate of Gonzaga College in Washington, D.C. Boone was educated at private schools in the city before enrolling at the College of the Holy Cross in Worcester, Massachusetts, where he graduated in 1851. The following year, Boone entered the Society of Jesus, proceeding to the Jesuit novitiate in Frederick, Maryland, on September 8, 1852.

After completing his novitiate, Boone was assigned to work at Georgetown University. He later taught at the novitiate in Frederick and then at Saint Joseph's College in Philadelphia, Pennsylvania. In 1860, Boone began his philosophical studies at Boston College, followed by theological studies at Georgetown. On July 2, 1866, he was ordained a priest by Martin John Spalding, the Archbishop of Baltimore, at the chapel of St. Mary's Seminary in Baltimore, Maryland.

== Ministry and teaching ==
After his ordination, Boone became a parish priest at St. Francis Xavier Church in Leonardtown, Maryland. From 1867 to 1870, he served as the vice president of Loyola College in Maryland. Afterward, he worked as a professor at various Jesuit colleges.

=== College of the Holy Cross ===
Following the death of Joseph B. O'Hagan, Boone became the president of the College of the Holy Cross on April 9, 1879. He was the first alumnus of the college to become its president. He oversaw the renovation of the interiors of several college buildings, creating a new dormitory, adding a billiard and reading room, and creating an outdoor handball alley. In 1880, Boone had plans drafted for a new building that would contain a gymnasium, laboratory, lecture hall, library, and billiard rooms. However, work on this project did not begin until 1890. In the 1880s, fundraising, for the first time, began to play a significant role for the college. The college catalogue of 1879–1880 solicited donations of up to $50,000 (equivalent to approximately $1.42 million in 2024) and offered naming privileges in exchange for such donations. In 1883, due to poor health, Boone asked the Jesuit Superior General, Peter Jan Beckx, to appoint a replacement. In June of that year, Boone was succeeded by Robert W. Brady.

== Later years ==
In 1884, Boone became the vice president of Gonzaga College in Washington, D.C. In 1890, he returned to Loyola College, where he spent the remainder of his life. During this time, he served as a confessor and from 1890 to 1904, he was the head chaplain at the Baltimore City Jail and the Maryland House of Correction. He spent his later years engaged in literature and was interested in the history of the state of Maryland.

In December 1915, after several months of declining health, he was taken to Mercy Hospital in Baltimore. On January 16, 1916, he died there. He was the last surviving member of his Holy Cross graduating class. His funeral was held the following day at St. Ignatius Church, and later that day, his body was taken by train to Woodstock, Maryland, and was buried at the Woodstock College cemetery.

Academic offices
| Preceded by Joseph B. O'Hagan | 11th President of the College of the Holy Cross; 1878–1883 | Succeeded by Robert W. Brady |
