= Holy Trinity Catholic Church (Washington, D.C.) =

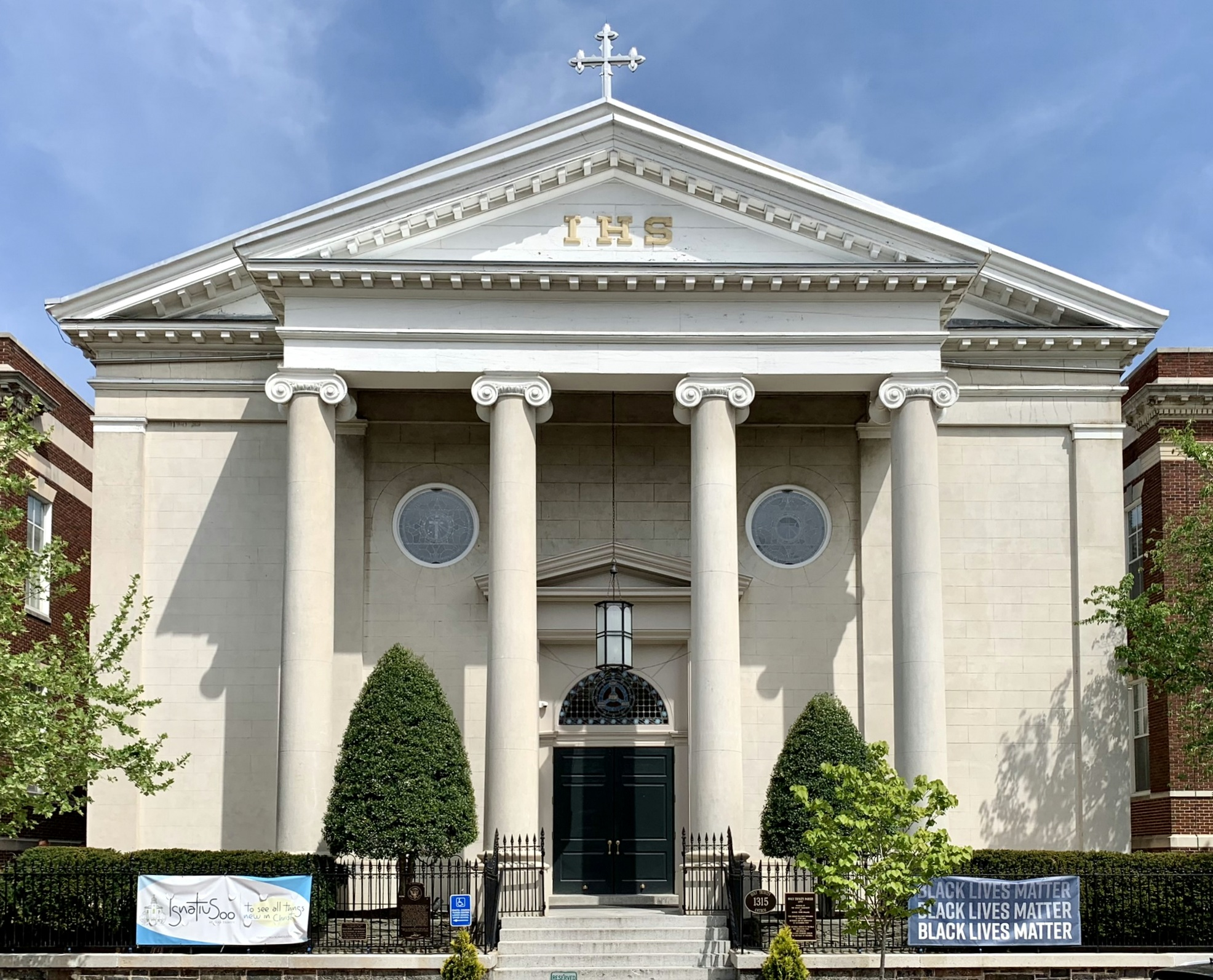
- Holy Trinity Catholic Church in 2022
- Holy Trinity Catholic Church
- 38°54′26″N 77°04′12″W
- Location: 3513 N Street NW; Washington, D.C.
- Country: U.S.
- Denomination: Roman Catholic
- Religious institute: Society of Jesus
- Website: www.trinity.org

History
- Status: Active
- Founded: 1787
- Founder: Francis Neale

Architecture
- Functional status: Parish church
- Years built: 1787 (renamed Chapel of St. Ignatius); 1851 (present building)

Administration
- Archdiocese: Washington

Clergy
- Pastor(s): Rev. C. Kevin Gillespie, SJ

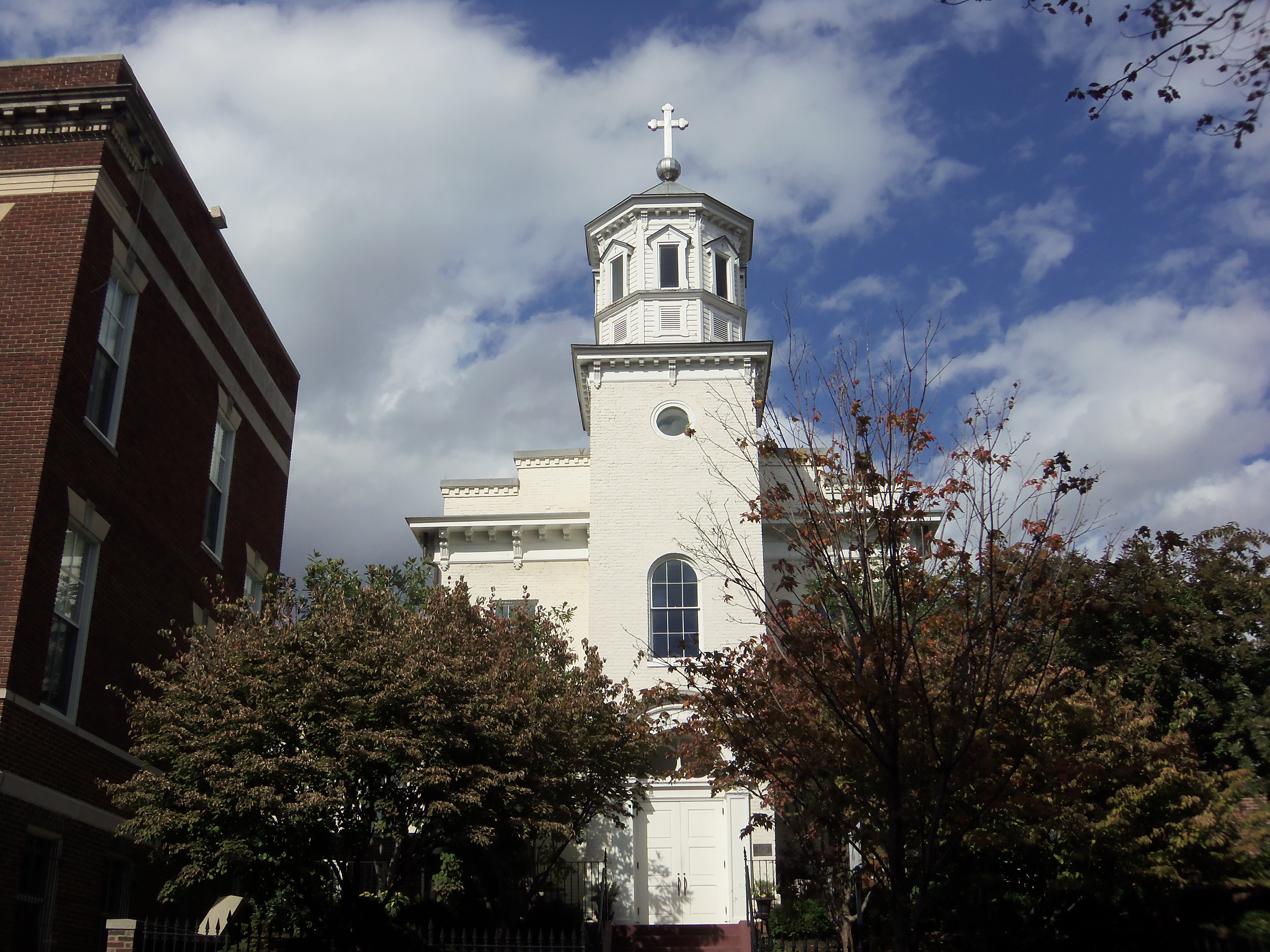
Chapel of St. Ignatius

Holy Trinity Catholic Church is a Catholic church run by the Jesuit order that is located in the Georgetown neighborhood of Washington, D.C., in the United States. Holy Trinity Parish was founded in 1787 and is the oldest Roman Catholic community and house of worship in continuous operation both in Georgetown and in the larger city of Washington, D.C. The original church building was completed in 1794. It is now called the Chapel of St. Ignatius, and is used for smaller ecclesiastical celebrations and as an auxiliary space for parish activities. A larger church building, necessitated by the growing community, was dedicated in 1851, and still serves as the parish church today.

== History ==
Holy Trinity Parish was established in 1787 at what is now 3513 N Street NW. The original building was originally called "Georgetown Chapel" because of the uncertainty of the laws against erecting Catholic churches. It was founded at the direction of Archbishop John Carroll, the founder of Georgetown College and, later, first Catholic bishop in America. (He was also a cousin of Charles Carroll, a signer of the Declaration of Independence.) In addition to Carroll, the church had four lay trustees: Adam King, George King, George Fenwick, and James Simpson. This church faced south and included a bell tower. During the early years it primarily served the growing Catholic population of Georgetown and the students of Georgetown College (now University). The first pastor was Rev. Francis Neale, S.J.

The congregation soon outgrew its original building, and in 1851 a larger structure was dedicated at 1301 36th Street NW. This structure faced west, and did not include a tower. The first church was retained and later renamed the Chapel of St. Ignatius. During the American Civil War, the federal government used the church as a hospital to treat more than 200 injured soldiers after the Second Battle of Bull Run in 1862. The government returned the building to the congregation in 1863 and later reimbursed it $350 for use of the building.

Holy Trinity parish established a parochial school for boys, Holy Trinity School, in 1818. It originally occupied a house on N Street east of the original church, but in 1818 the parish built a schoolhouse at the northwest corner of N and 35th Streets NW. Holy Trinity School served grades one through eight. The school closed in 1829, but reopened in 1831. Holy Trinity Church remodeled its original church structure into a school in 1871, and moved classes into the structure. The parish built two school buildings in 1918: The "Lower School" at the northeast corner of N and 36th Streets NW, and the "Upper School" at the southeast corner of O and 36th Streets NW. Students were delayed in using the Lower School, however, when the federal government requisitioned the building for use during World War I. The building was finally occupied as a schoolhouse in 1919.

President John F. Kennedy, a Roman Catholic, and his family frequently worshiped at Holy Trinity. Kennedy's attendance is commemorated by a plaque in front of the church building. The church is also the place Joe Biden worshiped when he was Vice-President and again as President as well as Speaker of the House Nancy Pelosi while she was in Washington.

== Cemetery ==
=== Holy Trinity Church cemetery of 1787 ===
A cemetery originally occupied what is now the site of the 1851 church and the Lower School. This informal burying ground was established long before Holy Trinity Church bought its land. In June 1796, an additional 20 feet (6.1 m) of land west of the church was purchased, and by 1798 the church owned all the ground west to 36th Street. Many of the graves were relocated in 1817 when the burying ground closed, but by as late as 1917 (when Lower School was built) hundreds of them still remained. Over time, nearly all the markers have been removed.

In 1998, Holy Trinity Church began construction on an addition in what was believed to be open space on its land. On October 21, a skull and some small bones were unearthed. District of Columbia law required a forensic anthropological investigation, and one began immediately. The investigation turned up the remains of 44 individuals (men, women, and children). Evidence indicated that some of them had been buried as early as 1837 while others dated to 1865, and at least one was an African American; these were reinterred in another cemetery. Archeologists believed, however, that additional remains still existed. But with each day of delay adding $10,000 to the cost of construction, Church officials decided graves that would be undisturbed by the project – such as those beneath the basement – should remain where they were.

=== College Ground ===
In 1818, Holy Trinity Church established a new burying ground on the north side of P Street NW at its intersection with 37th Street NW, adjacent to what is now Georgetown University's Maguire Hall. This cemetery was known as Trinity Burial Ground and the Old Burying Ground, but it was most commonly called College Ground. The first burial occurred there on December 8, 1818. At some point, a small chapel dedicated to St. Francis Xavier was also built there. One of the most famous burials at College Ground was that of Susan Decatur, wife of United States Navy hero Stephen Decatur. In 1837, Susan Decatur donated $7,000 to Georgetown University (equivalent to more than $3 million today), which saved the university from financial collapse and closure. A large number of African slaves, many of them owned by institutions (such as the university), were also buried in College Ground.

Based on parish records, the number of graves at College Ground numbered more than a thousand by 1833, when burials there ceased. The cemetery fell into disrepair, with many tombstones and memorials destroyed, removed, or dislocated and placed off to one side. There was so little evidence College Ground once existed that by the early 1930s the land was thought to be vacant. In 1931, Georgetown University began construction on a new dormitory, Copley Hall. When workers began clearing a "vacant lot" 100 feet (30 m) north of the Copley Hall excavation site, they rediscovered College Ground. Embarrassed by its sub-par stewardship of the graveyard, the university agreed to restore and care for the burying ground. But within 20 years, the college's need for land proved greater than its commitment to the cemetery.

In 1953, Georgetown University began preparing College Ground for new buildings. The university publicly said that only 189 sets of remains existed there. Fifty were transferred to Mount Olivet Cemetery, while most of the others were transferred to Holy Trinity Church's Holy Rood Cemetery. (A few were claimed by families, while a handful of others were reinterred in other cemeteries.) Historian Carlton Fletcher believes the 850 or so remaining bodies in College Ground either are still buried there, or were dug up and scattered when the Reiss Science Building (1962) and Edward B. Bunn S.J. Intercultural Center (1982) were excavated.

=== Holy Rood Cemetery ===
Holy Rood Cemetery with the Washington Monument in the background

The College Ground closed to new burials when Holy Trinity Church acquired a new, larger burying ground, about a mile north of the church, in 1832. Originally called the Upper Grave Yard, this cemetery is located on High St., now Wisconsin Ave., NW, and the southern terminus of Tunlaw Rd., NW. It was enlarged in 1853, and a sexton's house was constructed at the entrance, which originally was on Tunlaw Rd., NW. The grounds were enlarged again in 1866 and 1867 to their present size of 6.5 acres (26,000 m^{2}), a new sexton's house and a holding crypt were constructed, and a stone retaining wall and main gate were erected on Wisconsin Ave., NW, which became the entrance to the cemetery. At this time the Upper Grave Yard received the name Holy Rood, a name derived from the Scottish, meaning "Holy Cross." Under a 1942 agreement with the Roman Catholic Archdiocese of Washington, in which Holy Trinity Church's deeds were consolidated and transferred to the Archdiocese, Georgetown University continues to hold title to Holy Rood Cemetery. The University closed the cemetery to new burials in 1984.

There are 7,312 known burials at Holy Rood, as well as an unknown number of unidentified pauper's graves located in the northwest corner of the cemetery. In 1984, the university attempted to move all the remains to other cemeteries and use the Holy Rood land for real estate development, but was stopped after a successful lawsuit by descendants of those buried there. The university subsequently agreed to keep the cemetery open to visitors. While not providing "perpetual care" (the highest degree of cemetery maintenance), it agreed to continue keeping the grass mowed.

In 2018, at the initiative of a group of Holy Trinity parishioners, Holy Trinity and Georgetown University developed a plan to restore Holy Rood Cemetery. The plan included repairs to the existing infrastructure, resetting fallen headstones, enhancements to landscaping, and improvements to the cemetery entrance. As part of the plan, the University gave Holy Trinity an easement, allowing it to construct a 645-niche columbarium at Holy Rood for the remains of parishioners and others. The columbarium niches are located in a new granite wall and within the restored holding crypt. A portion of the proceeds from niche sales is invested in a perpetual care trust to ensure the future maintenance of the cemetery. The Holy Rood restoration and columbarium project was completed in November 2019.

== Notable pastors ==
Pastors have included:

- Francis Neale (1790–1817)
- Benedict Joseph Fenwick (1817–1818)
- Stephen Larigaudelle Dubuisson (1825–1826, 1831–1833))
- Anthony Rey (1845)
- John McElroy (1845–1846)
- Anthony F. Ciampi (1856–1857)
- Thomas F. Mulledy (1857–1858)
- Anthony F. Ciampi (1866–1868, 1878–1881)
- Charles H. Stonestreet (1870–1874)
- Stephen A. Kelly (1881–1890)
- Robert W. Brady (1890–1891)
- Arthur A. O'Leary (1947–1953)
- William J. Byron (2000–2003)
- C. Kevin Gillespie (from 2015)

== See also ==
- List of Jesuit sites

== Bibliography ==
- Curran, Robert Emmett (1993). From Academy to University, 1789–1889. Washington, D.C.: Georgetown University Press. ISBN 9780878404858.
- Kelly, Laurence J. (1945). The History of Holy Trinity Parish, Washington D.C., 1795–1945. Baltimore, Md.: John D. Lucas Printing Company.
- Warner, William W. (1994). At Peace With All Their Neighbors: Catholics and Catholicism in the National Capital, 1787–1960. Washington, D.C.: Georgetown University Press. ISBN 1589012437.
