= St. Aloysius Church (Washington, D.C.) =

Historic church in Washington, D.C., United States

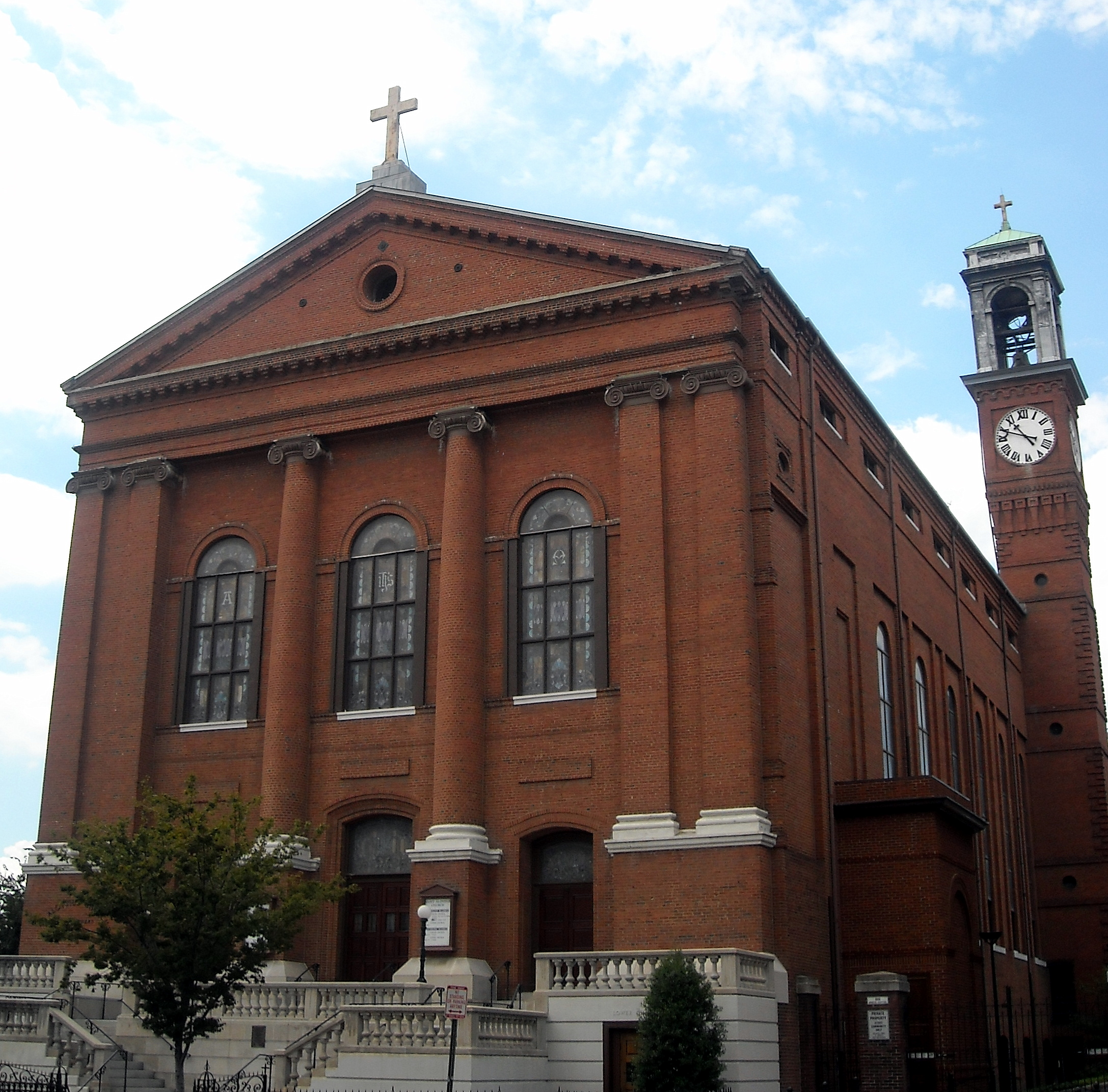
- St. Aloysius Church
- Location: 19 Eye Street, NW; Washington, D.C.
- Country: United States
- Denomination: Roman Catholic

History
- Status: Active
- Dedicated: October 16, 1859; 166 years ago

Architecture
- Functional status: Chapel of Ease and High School chapel. Former Parish church
- Architect(s): Benedict Sestini, SJ
- Architectural type: Church
- Style: Renaissance
- Completed: 1859; 167 years ago

Administration
- Province: Province of Washington; Jesuit Maryland Province
- Archdiocese: Washington
- St. Aloysius Catholic Church
- U.S. National Register of Historic Places
- D.C. Inventory of Historic Sites
- Location within Central Washington, D.C. Location within the District of Columbia Location within the United States
- Location: 19 I St., NW. (at N. Capitol St.), Washington, District of Columbia
- Coordinates: 38°54′5″N 77°0′36″W
- Area: 0.4 acres (0.16 ha)
- Built: 1857
- Architect: Sestini, Benedict
- Architectural style: Renaissance
- NRHP reference No.: 73002116

Significant dates
- Added to NRHP: July 26, 1973
- Designated DCIHS: March 7, 1968

St. Aloysius Catholic Church was a Roman Catholic parish church constructed in 1859 at 19 I Street in the Near Northeast neighborhood of Washington, D. C. It was administered by the Jesuits since its founding and is physically connected to Gonzaga College High School, to which it is physically connected. The church building is listed on the National Register of Historic Places. In 2012 the parish was closed and merged with Holy Redeemer church.

On April 6, 2017, a tornado hit the church, destroying part of the roof and causing damage to the interior.

== Notable pastors ==
- Anthony Kohlmann (1821–1824)
- Burchard Villiger (1857–1858)
- Charles H. Stonestreet (1858–1860)
- William Francis Clarke (1860–1861)
- James Clark (1868–1874)
- Robert J. Fulton (1881–1882)
- Edward A. McGurk (1885–1890)
- Cornelius Gillespie (1890–1898)
- Joseph J. Himmel (1907)
- Charles W. Lyons (1907–1909)

== See also ==
- List of Jesuit sites
