= Gerard Reedy =

American academic and priest (1939–2016)

Gerard C. Reedy, S.J., (October 25, 1939 – March 11, 2016) was an American Jesuit priest, academic and academic administrator. Reedy served as the 30th President of the College of the Holy Cross from 1994 until 1998. He also served as a professor of English and academic dean at Fordham University for almost forty years.

== Life and career ==
Reedy was born to Charles and Margaret (Deasy) Reedy on October 25, 1939, in Bellerose, New York. He graduated from Regis High School, a Jesuit school in New York City, and entered the Society of Jesus in 1957. He studied philosophy at Loyola Seminary and completed his degree in theology from the former Woodstock College in Maryland. Reedy received a Ph.D. in English from the University of Pennsylvania in Philadelphia.

His writings include two books: The Bible and Reason: Anglicans and Scripture in Late Seventeenth-Century England and Robert South (1634-1716): An Introduction to His Life and Sermons.

Reedy died on March 11, 2016, at the age of 76.
