= Jesuit formation =

Training program for Jesuits

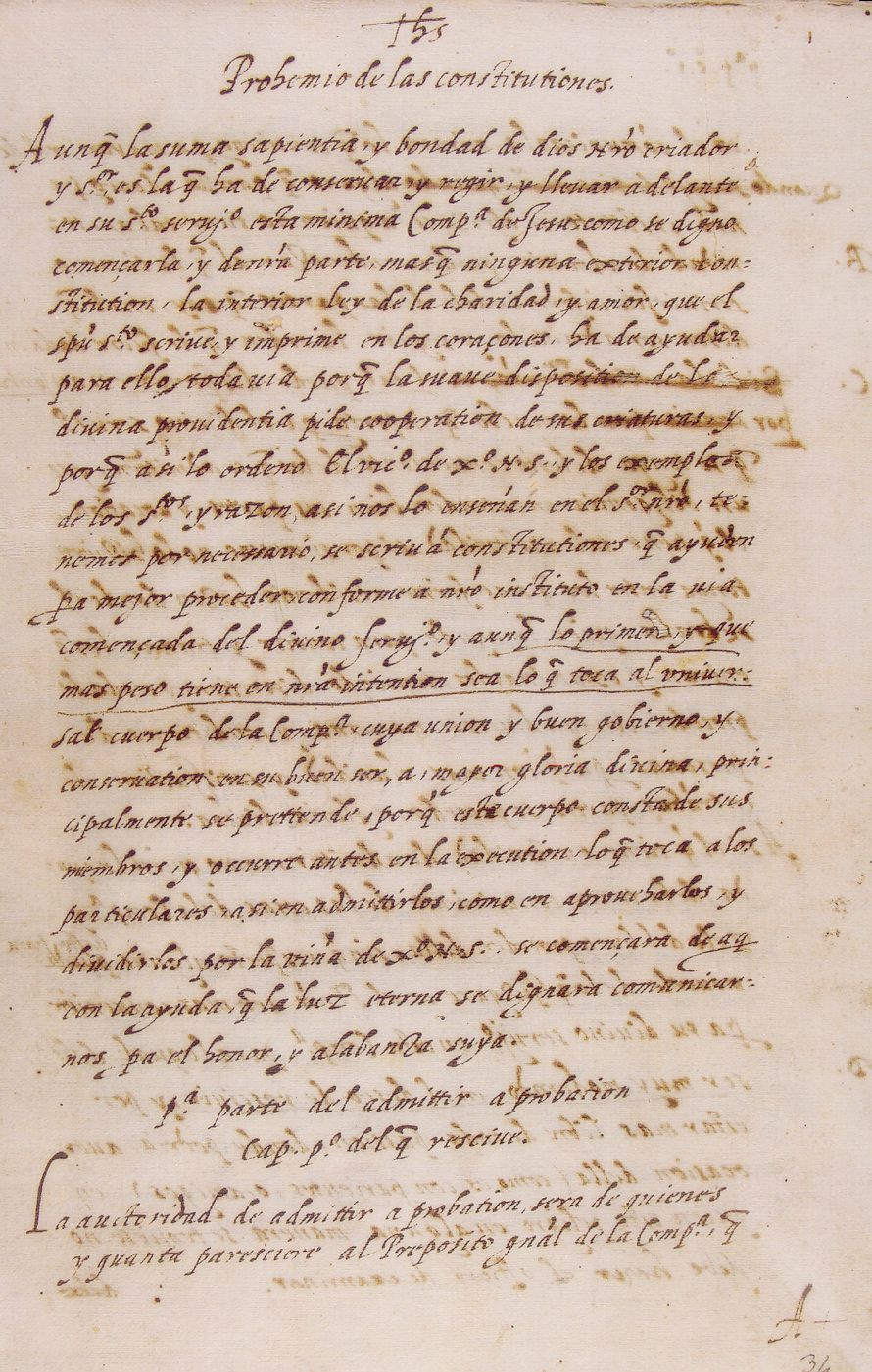
The original handwritten preamble of the Constitutions of the Society of Jesus, by Ignatius of Loyola, laying out Jesuit formation

Jesuit formation, or the training of Jesuits, is the process by which candidates are prepared for ordination or brotherly service in the Society of Jesus, the world's largest male Catholic religious order. The process is based on the Constitution of the Society of Jesus written by Ignatius of Loyola and approved in 1550. There are various stages, from a novice, to studying, to full-time work and a return to studies before ordination as a priest or final profession as a brother. They are formed spiritually, academically and practically for the ministries they offer the Church and world.

== Stages ==
St. Ignatius was strongly influenced by the Renaissance and wanted Jesuits to be able to offer whatever ministries were most needed at any given moment, and especially, to be ready to respond to missions (assignments) from the Pope. Formation for priesthood normally takes between 8 and 17 years, depending on the man's background and previous education, and final vows are taken several years after that, making Jesuit formation among the longest of any of the religious orders.

After two years as a novice, the Jesuit pronounces his First Vows (perpetual simple vows of poverty, chastity and obedience and a vow to persevere to final profession and ordination) and becomes either a Scholastic (entering onto the path of priesthood) or a Jesuit brother. The scholastics (who may be addressed by the secular title "Mister") and the Brothers (addressed by the title "Brother") of the Society of Jesus have different courses of study, although they often overlap.

== Jesuit scholastics ==
For scholastics, the usual course of studies is as follows:

- First Studies is the period when the scholastic begins his academic formation. Depending on his prior education it will last 2–4 years, guaranteeing a grounding in philosophy and the attainment of at least a first university level degree thus, in the United States, a four-year bachelor's degree (unless this has already been earned). It may also introduce the study of theology or some other specialized area.
- As Jesuits, particularly in the United States, serve on the faculties of high schools and universities, and in a wide variety of other positions, the Jesuit scholastic or Jesuit priest often earns a master or doctoral degree on some area—it may be, for instance, Theology or it may be History, English, Chemistry, Educational Administration, Law or any other subject. Hence, a Jesuit may spend another few years earning a graduate degree beyond the bachelor's.
- Regency is the next stage, wherein the scholastic lives and works in a typical Jesuit community (as opposed to the "formation communities" he has lived in so far). He is engaged full-time in ministry (an Apostolate), which is traditionally teaching in a secondary school, but it may be any ministry Jesuits are engaged in. Regency lasts for 2–3 years.
- Theology is the stage for Jesuits immediately preceding ordination. By universal canon law, every candidate for priestly ordination must complete four years in the study of theology, though part of this requirement may have been met in the first period studies. This will include the attainment of a first degree in theology (such as the Bachelor of Sacred Theology), and usually a second (masters level) degree in a specialized area related to theology. (As such, it is not uncommon for a Jesuit to hold a master's level degree in Theology, and a second master's degree or a doctorate in a completely different field.) At the end of theology studies, candidates for the Catholic priesthood are ordained to the transitional diaconate, and serve as a deacon for six months to a year.
- Ordination to the priesthood follows, and the new priest may receive a ministerial assignment or be sent back for further studies in any academic field.

== Vows ==
The ordained Jesuit priest will either be chosen for profession as a "spiritual coadjutor", taking the usual perpetual vows of poverty, chastity and obedience, or for profession as a "professed of the four vows".

- A few years after ordination to priesthood, or for brothers after a number of years' work, a Jesuit will undertake Tertianship, so named because it is something like a third year of novitiate. After his first few years of experience of ministry as a priest or brother, the Jesuit completes the final stage of formal formation by revisiting the essentials of Jesuit life which he learned as a novice: once again, he studies the history and Constitutions of the Jesuits, he makes the Spiritual Exercises and participates in experimentism, most often by serving in ministries to the sick, terminally ill or poor.
- Final Vows for the fully professed follow upon tertianship, wherein the Jesuit pronounces perpetual solemn vows of poverty, chastity, obedience, and the Fourth vow, unique to Jesuits, of special obedience to the pope in matters regarding mission, promising to undertake any mission laid out in the Formula of the Institute the pope may choose.
- Only the professed of the Four Vows are eligible for posts like novice master, provincial superior or assistant to the general of the society.
- The professed of the four solemn perpetual vows take five additional Simple Vows:
  - not to consent to any mitigation of the Society's observance of poverty;
  - not to "ambition" or seek any prelacies (ecclesiastical offices) outside the Society;
  - not to "ambition" to any office within the Society;
  - a commitment to report any Jesuit who does so ambition; and
  - a promise that if a Jesuit does become a bishop, to permit the general to continue to advise him, although the vow of obedience to Jesuit superiors is not operative over activities he undertakes as a bishop.

Under these vows, no Jesuit may "campaign" or even offer his name for appointment or election to any office, and if chosen for one must remind the appointing authority (even the Pope) of these vows.

== Jesuit brothers ==
The formation of Jesuit brothers has a much less structured form. Before the Second Vatican Council, Jesuit brothers worked almost exclusively within Jesuit communities as cooks, tailors, farmers, secretaries, accountants, librarians and maintenance support—they were thus technically known as "temporal coadjutors", as they assisted the professed priests by undertaking the more "worldly" jobs, freeing the professed of the four vows and the "spiritual coadjutors" to undertake the sacramental and spiritual missions of the Society. Following the Second Vatican Council, which recognized the mission of all the Christian faithful, not just those who are ordained, to share in the ministries of the Church, Jesuit brothers began to engage in ministries outside of their communities. Today, the formation of a Jesuit brother may take many forms, depending on his aptitude for ministry. He may pursue a highly academic formation which mirrors that of the scholastics (there are, for instance, some Jesuit brothers who serve as university professors), or he may pursue more practical training in areas such as pastoral counseling or spiritual direction (some assist in giving retreats, for instance), or he may continue in the traditional "supporting" roles in which so many Jesuit brothers have attained notable achievements (as administrative aides, for example). Since Vatican II, the Society has officially adopted the term "brother", which was always the unofficial form of address for the temporal coadjutors.

== Language studies ==
Today, all Jesuits are expected to learn English, and American Jesuits who speak English as a first language are expected to learn Spanish.

== See also ==
- Seminary
