= Tertianship =

Final stage of Jesuit formation

Tertianship is the final period of formation for members of the Society of Jesus. Upon invitation of the Provincial, it usually begins three to five years after completion of graduate studies. It is a time when the candidate for final vows steps back to assess his experience of living and working in the Society of Jesus and to discern whether this is the life to which he is being called by Christ. The Constitutions of the Society indicate that

after completing his studies (which were concerned with the cultivation of the intellect), the scholastic should apply himself to the schola affectus (which deals with matters of the heart), by turning now to "spiritual and corporal" works, which will help him to make progress in humility and in the denial of selfishness and self-will or self-opinionatedness.

Tertianship characteristically takes place either through the course of an academic year or through two consecutive summers. During this time, the Jesuit in formation, called a "tertian", will undertake an apostolic placement of teaching or service. The tertian will also return to study the history and foundational documents of the Society, study of ascetical theology, and undergo a thirty-day silent retreat based on the Spiritual Exercises of Ignatius of Loyola.
