= List of presidents of Boston College =

Head of Boston College

President of Boston College
- Incumbent; John T. Butler, SJ since 2026
- Appointer: Boston College Board of Governors
- Formation: 1863
- First holder: John Bapst (1863 - 1869)
- Website: Office of the President

Boston College is a private Jesuit research university in Chestnut Hill, Massachusetts, that was founded in 1863. The president of Boston College is the head of the university.

== Presidents ==
Presidents
No.	Image	Name	Years	Ref.
1		John Bapst SJ	1863–1869	
2		Robert W. Brady SJ	1869–1870	
3		Robert J. Fulton SJ	1870–1880	
4		Jeremiah O'Connor SJ	1880–1884	
5		Edward V. Boursaud SJ	1884–1887	
6		Thomas H. Stack SJ	1887	
7		Nicholas Russo SJ	1887–1888	
8		Robert J. Fulton SJ	1888–1891	
9		Edward I. Devitt SJ	1891–1894	
10		Timothy Brosnahan SJ	1894–1898	
11		W. G. Read Mullan SJ	1898–1903	
12		William F. Gannon SJ	1903–1907	
13		Thomas I. Gasson SJ	1907–1914	
14		Charles W. Lyons SJ	1914–1919	
15		William Devlin SJ	1919–1925	
16		James H. Dolan SJ	1925–1932	
17		Louis J. Gallagher SJ	1932–1937	
18		William J. McGarry SJ	1937–1939	
19		William J. Murphy SJ	1939–1945	
20		William L. Keleher SJ	1945–1951	
21		Joseph R. N. Maxwell SJ	1951–1958	
22		Michael P. Walsh SJ	1958–1968	
23		W. Seavey Joyce SJ	1968–1972	
24		J. Donald Monan SJ	1972–1996	
25		William P. Leahy SJ	1996–2026	
26		John T. Butler SJ	2026–present	

== See also ==
- List of Boston College people
- Jesuits in the United States
