= The Heights (newspaper) =

Independent student newspaper at Boston College

- Front page of The Heights on April 18, 2013
- Type: Student newspaper
- Format: Digital
- School: Boston College
- Owner: The Heights Inc.
- Founder: John Ring
- President: Genevieve Morrison
- Managing editor: Aidan Gravina
- General Manager: Charlie Phillips
- Founded: 1919; 107 years ago
- Headquarters: 113 McElroy Commons; Chestnut Hill, Massachusetts 02467
- ISSN: 2473-6554
- OCLC number: 244126535
- Website: www.bcheights.com

The Heights is the independent student newspaper of Boston College. It is editorially and financially independent from the university. The newspaper's editorial board consists of 52 editors and managers who are responsible for the operations of the newspaper.

On May 3, 2021, The Heights suspended regular printing and moved to a digital-only online publication, with occasional special print editions.

== Founding and early years ==
Led by John Ring, class of 1920, the first Heights debuted as a weekly newspaper on November 19, 1919 at a mere four pages, becoming the smallest college newspaper at the time. The Heights received funding from the school and ran stories about student clubs, sporting events, and lectures on campus. The first board declared The Heights a “news organ” that would live up to the “purity and ruggedness” of its name. Notably, in 1920, an editorial ran suggesting that the mascot of BC be an eagle; the Eagle remains the mascot of Boston College.

Through the early years of the 1930s and 1940s, The Heights remained focused on campus issues. During World War II, The Heights began to include editorials of greater international focus, including pieces about the draft and the war, though Boston College remained the focal point. Among other issues, The Heights wrote heavily about the need for an active student council; The Heights first petitioned in 1947, predating the current undergraduate government (UGBC) by a number of years. Before the ’50s, the buildings in the Quad had no official names. What is now Gasson was simply “the tower building,” and what are now Lyons, Devlin, and Fulton were also nameless. The Heights suggested naming the buildings after influential figures in the university's history.

Eventually, the focus of The Heights was not limited to University issues, but also included national issues. In the 1950s, The Heights reprinted a Martin Luther King Jr. article, and in 1960, accusing the university of not honoring the rights of its black students. The Heights also became more vocal about the Vietnam War, encouraging discussion of the war and calling for an end to it through support of protest groups.

These more liberal attitudes at the time were a shift from Boston College's more conservative, Catholic values, and became the beginnings of a strained relationship between the paper and the university administrators.

== Loss of school funding ==
By the mid-1960s, the paper began to come into conflict with the school's administration. At one point, the paper wanted to sponsor a lecture by birth control activist William Baird, but the university wouldn’t allow it, as birth control opposes stated Jesuit and Catholic values; The Heights still held the lecture in its office in McElroy. The university placed sanctions on five Heights editors for their actions. Thus began University president Fr. Joyce's somewhat tense relationship with The Heights.

Soon, though, the paper would be forced to divorce itself from university funding in order to maintain editorial independence. In 1971, The Heights had a source bug a board of trustees meeting and printed a transcript of the meeting in the next issue, publicizing the university’s plans to fire Executive Vice President Fr. F. X. Shea. The administration pressed charges and had a restraining order put on the information. The paper's editors, Tom Sheehan and Michael Berkey, were arrested on charges of conspiring to obtain information by illegal means. They pleaded no contest and were assessed a small fine. Sheehan and Berkey believed they were acting in the best interest of the student body; one BC professor, Richard Hughes, described Sheehan as “a genuine crusader, passionately dedicated to his beliefs.” The administration evicted The Heights, and cut off all funding after the incident. In the meantime, the newspaper operated out of the office of the Undergraduate Government of Boston College (UGBC) with borrowed money. Eventually, editors cut a deal with the administration to rent out McElroy 113, its current location. From 1971 onwards, The Heights would be an independent college newspaper, but would occasionally still clash with the values of the Jesuit University; in 1978, the university threatened not to renew lease after the paper published ads for an abortion clinic.

== 1981 lawsuit over campus police logs ==
In October 1981, The Heights filed a lawsuit against Boston College in Middlesex County Superior Court, seeking access to the campus police daily log. The suit argued that the University’s refusal to release the records violated the Massachusetts Freedom of Information Act and the state’s Daily Logs/Public Records Act.

Because the statutes had not previously been applied to police departments at private universities, the case raised novel legal questions. The challenge was broadened later that month when similar access efforts at Boston University led to the arrest of four staff members from the student newspaper Daily Free Press.

Boston College administrators responded that the campus police log was treated as confidential to protect the privacy of students and other involved parties, while noting that summarized incident information was shared with the student press and that crime data was reported to the state for inclusion in public Uniform Crime Reports. The University maintained that it did not suppress information about serious crimes and stated that the legal issues raised by the lawsuit would be addressed through the courts.

A judge ruled in The Heights' favor and ordered the Boston College Police Department to turn over the daily logs to the newspaper.

== Modern-day paper ==
In recent years, the board has editorialized in favor of the creation of an LGBTQ resource center and university divestment from fossil fuels. As an independent student newspaper, The Heights may print what the editorial board chooses, but must retain a relationship with the university to retain campus distribution rights and the newspaper office's lease agreement in McElroy Commons. In 2003, this lease was called into question following publication of a sexually explicit column called “Sex and the Univer-city.” In 2021, The Heights faced similar pressure from the BC administration after reporting on University President William P. Leahy's inaction over early warning signs of sexual abuse conducted by former BC chaplain Ted Dziak, S.J.

In 2004, the paper began printing twice weekly, Mondays and Thursdays. In 2017, The Heights returned to a once-a-week print cycle, and in 2021, The Heights ceased printing regular editions and began publishing a weekly "E-Edition" online instead. Since then, The Heights has continued to print its annual commencement edition, as well as occasional special print editions for events such as Black History Month.

== Notable writers ==
- Mark Mulvoy (1964), sports journalist and writer for The Boston Globe and Sports Illustrated
- Lesley Visser (1975), sportscaster and the first woman to serve as an NFL analyst on network television
- Mike Lupica (1974), longtime sports columnist for the New York Daily News and member of the National Sports Media Association Hall of Fame
- Martin F. Nolan (1961), Boston Globe Washington bureau chief and editorial page editor, part of the paper's staff that won the 1966 Pulitzer Prize for Public Service
- Jim Doyle (1956), Boston Globe reporter, part of the paper's staff that won the 1966 Pulitzer Prize for Public Service
- Will Hobson (2006), investigative reporter for The Washington Post and recipient of the 2014 Pulitzer Prize for Local Reporting
- Matt Hamilton (2009), Los Angeles Times reporter and two-time Pulitzer Prize winner, in 2016 and 2019
- Reeves Wiedeman (2008), contributing editor at New York magazine and author of Billion Dollar Loser
- Marina Lopes (2011), correspondent for The Washington Post
- Brennan Carley (2013), associate editor at GQ
- Zak Jason (2011), executive editor at Business Insider, formerly a features editor and director of standards at Wired
