= Edward V. Boursaud =

American Jesuit priest (1840–1902)

The Reverend Edward V. Boursaud SJ
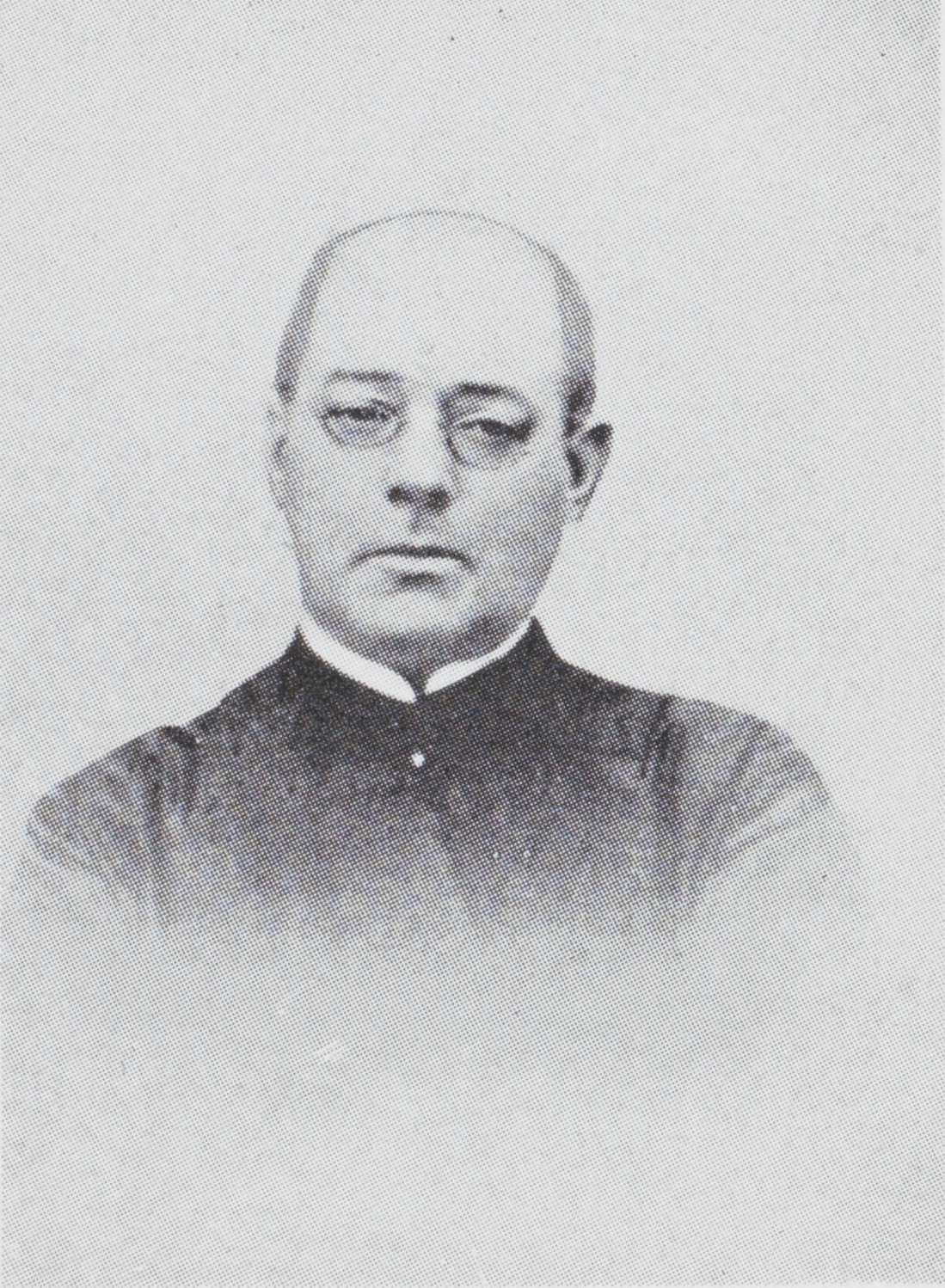
- Boursaud c. 1884

5th Rector of Woodstock College
- In office 1890–1893
- Preceded by: Pierre O. Racicot
- Succeeded by: Joseph Jerge

5th President of Boston College
- In office 1884–1887
- Preceded by: Jeremiah O'Connor
- Succeeded by: Thomas H. Stack

Personal details
- Born: September 1, 1840 New York City, U.S.
- Died: March 19, 1902 (aged 61) Frederick, Maryland, U.S.
- Resting place: Woodstock College cemetery

Orders
- Ordination: April 6, 1877

Edward Victor Boursaud SJ (September 1, 1840 – March 19, 1902) was an American Catholic priest and Jesuit who was the president of Boston College from 1884 to 1887. Raised in New York City and France, he studied at Mount St. Mary's College in Maryland before entering the Society of Jesus in 1863. For the next 18 years, he studied and taught at Jesuit institutions, including Boston College, Georgetown College, and Woodstock College, as well as the novitiate in Frederick, Maryland. In 1881 and 1887, he served three-year terms in Italy as the assistant secretary to the Jesuit Superior General for the English-speaking world.

In 1884, Boursaud became the president of Boston College, where he would remain for three years. He then served three years as the rector of Woodstock College from 1890 to 1893. In his later years, he spent time teaching and as a spiritual father at Jesuit institutions throughout the eastern United States.

== Early life ==
Edward Victor Boursaud was born on September 1, 1840, in New York City. Boursaud's father, Augustin, was born in Bourdeaux, France, and emigrated to New York at the age of thirty. Boursaud's mother, Elizabeth née Perret, was born in New York City and was of French and Swiss descent. After marrying in New York City, Boursaud's parents moved to Baltimore, Maryland, where Boursaud's father ran a large, private, boarding school and day school for 10 years. While Boursaud's mother was visiting New York City (Brooklyn was then a separate city), she gave birth to Boursaud. The family then moved to Brooklyn in 1850, where Boursaud's father would operate a school for another 18 years.

Boursaud was educated by his father in his school. While a child, he moved with his parents to France. Boursaud studied there before returning to the United States. He worked for a time as a clerk in an import house in New York City. Boursaud then enrolled at Mount St. Mary's College in Emmitsburg, Maryland, and graduated in June 1863. He became familiar with the Jesuits during a retreat, and entered the Society of Jesus on August 14 of that year, proceeding to the Jesuit novitiate in Frederick, Maryland.

== Jesuit formation ==
After two years as a novice, Boursaud became a professor of classics at the Jesuit juniorate in Frederick. In his first year, he also taught grammar, and in his second year, he taught poetry. While at the novitiate, he translated Joseph-Epiphane Darras's A General History of the Catholic Church from French to English, at Archbishop Martin John Spalding's request. Boursaud then taught poetry at Georgetown College in Washington, D.C., from 1867 to 1870. While there, he served as the president of the Philodemic Society at Georgetown. Boursaud began his philosophical and theological studies at Woodstock College in Woodstock, Maryland, in September 1871. During this time, he was also a writer and effectively an editor for the Messenger of the Sacred Heart.

Boursaud was ordained a priest on April 6, 1877, and completed his theological studies the next year. In 1878, he went to Boston College in Massachusetts, teaching sophomores as a professor of poetry and rhetoric, for a year each. In 1880, he taught juniors at the Frederick scholasticate as a professor of rhetoric. Boursaud then returned to Woodstock College for a year of asceticism.

He became the first American appointed to be the assistant secretary of the Jesuit Superior General's assistancy for the English-speaking world in 1881. Boursaud was fluent in English, French, Italian, Spanish, and Latin, which was useful in this position. He remained in this position for three years, and resided in Fiesole, Italy, where the Superior General was then based. While there, he completed his third year of probation and professed his final vows on August 15, 1882, which were accepted by Superior General Peter Jan Beckx.

== Boston College ==
Boursaud returned to the United States, and on July 31, 1884, he succeeded Jeremiah O'Conor as the fifth president of Boston College. During his presidency, Boursaud was also the pastor of Immaculate Conception Church in the South End of Boston, which was Boston College's chapel. Enrollment at the college increased from 250 in 1883 to 297 in 1886. His first project was to remodel and expand the basement of Immaculate Conception Church, adding marble altars, statues, and stained glass windows. During a strike by streetcar workers, in support of the strikers, Boursaud refused to ride the streetcars.

The requirements for the degree of Master of Arts were first established during Boursaud's term, but the first master's degree was not awarded until after the end of his presidency. When approached by an alumnus about creating a Boston College alumni organization, Boursaud was reluctant to endorse it because he believed there was insufficient interest by alumni. However, after interest was shown, he gave his approval for alumni to create the organization in 1886. Boursaud's presidency ended on August 5, 1887, and he was succeeded by Thomas H. Stack.

== Later years ==
After the end of his presidency at Boston College, Boursaud returned to Italy and resumed the position of assistant secretary of the English-speaking assistancy for three years. Around this time, his health began to decline, and he returned to the United States in 1890, initially going to Georgetown. On October 9, 1890, Boursaud became the rector of Woodstock College. He held this position until November 29, 1893, when his health began to significantly deteriorate. He also became the socius to the provincial superior of the Jesuit Maryland-New York Province. (Note: A socius is an assistant to a Jesuit provincial superior.)

In 1894, Boursaud was stationed at Saint Joseph's College in Philadelphia, Pennsylvania, as an assistant to the central director of the Apostleship of Prayer and as a staff member of the Messenger of the Sacred Heart, that organization's publication. When the apostleship moved to New York City, he moved with it. In 1895, Boursaud returned to Boston College served as the treasurer. The following year, he became a teacher of the lower classes and spiritual father at the school.

Due to his failing health, Boursaud was sent by his superiors to Spring Hill College in Mobile, Alabama. When his health improved, he went to Frederick for a year as the instructor of the third year of probation. He was then stationed at the College of St. Francis Xavier in New York City and Saint Joseph's College in Philadelphia for a year each as spiritual father. After a time at Woodstock College, where he edited a new edition of the Raccolta, he retired to the Frederick novitiate. In Frederick, he suffered several strokes and kidney disease. Boursaud died on March 19, 1902, at the Jesuit novitiate in Frederick, Maryland. His body was buried in the cemetery at Woodstock College.

== Works ==
- Darras, M. L'abbe J. E. (1866). A General History of the Catholic Church: From the Commencement of the Christian Era Until the Present Time. Translated by Boursaud, Edward V. (1st American ed.). New York: P. O'Shea. OCLC 70837258 – via Google Books.

== Notes ==
Academic offices
Preceded by Jeremiah O'Connor	5th President of Boston College; 1884–1887	Succeeded by Thomas H. Stack
Preceded by Pierre O. Racicot	5th Rector of Woodstock College; 1890–1893	Succeeded by Joseph Jerge
Catholic Church titles
Preceded by Jeremiah O'Connor	6th Pastor of Immaculate Conception Church; 1884–1887	Succeeded by Thomas H. Stack
