= The Retreat (Rambaud novel) =

2000 novel by Patrick Rambaud

- First edition
- Author: Patrick Rambaud
- Original title: Il neigeait
- Translator: Will Hobson
- Language: French
- Genre: Historic novel
- Publisher: Edition Grasset et Fasquelle (France), Grove Press (US translation)
- Publication date: 2000 (English translation 2004)
- Publication place: France
- Media type: Print (Hardback & Paperback)
- Pages: 307 p.
- ISBN: 0-87113-877-8

The Retreat (French: Il neigeait) is a historic novel by the French author Patrick Rambaud that was first published in 2000. The English translation by Will Hobson appeared in 2004.

The Retreat describes the occupation of Moscow by the French Army in 1812 and its disastrous retreat. The action in the novel follows closely historical observations and descriptions as seen from the French perspective. The main characters are Napoleon, Sebastian Roque who becomes his scribe during the campaign, and Captain D'Herbigny of the Guard. The defeat of the French army is relived through their experiences. The Retreat is the second book of a trilogy by Rambaud about the decline of Napoleon, describing his first major setback; the other two books cover Napoleon’s earlier defeat at Aspern-Essling in The Battle and his later banishment at Elba in Napoleon’s Exile (published as The Exile in the United Kingdom).

As explained by Rambaud in the attached Historical Notes, the French title Il neigeait (meaning "it snowed") refers to a poem by Victor Hugo that is entitled Expiation (atonement) part of Les Châtiments (The Punishments) and describes the retreat from Russia.
