= Mission of Our Lady of Loreto =

Jesuit establishment in New York City

The Mission of Our Lady of Loreto was established by the Jesuit fathers on Elizabeth Street on the Lower East Side to serve the large population of Italian immigrants. It sponsored a number of programs. The parish closed in 2011, but its cultural center became The Sheen Center, the Archdiocese of New York's venue for arts and culture.

== History ==
In 1891 Archbishop Michael Corrigan asked the Jesuits to undertake the pastoral care of Italian immigrants on the Lower East Side. Provincial superior, Thomas J. Campbell chose Italian-born Rev. Nicholas Russo of the parish of St. Lawrence O'Toole to lead the effort. Russo had been a professor and president pro tem at Boston College.

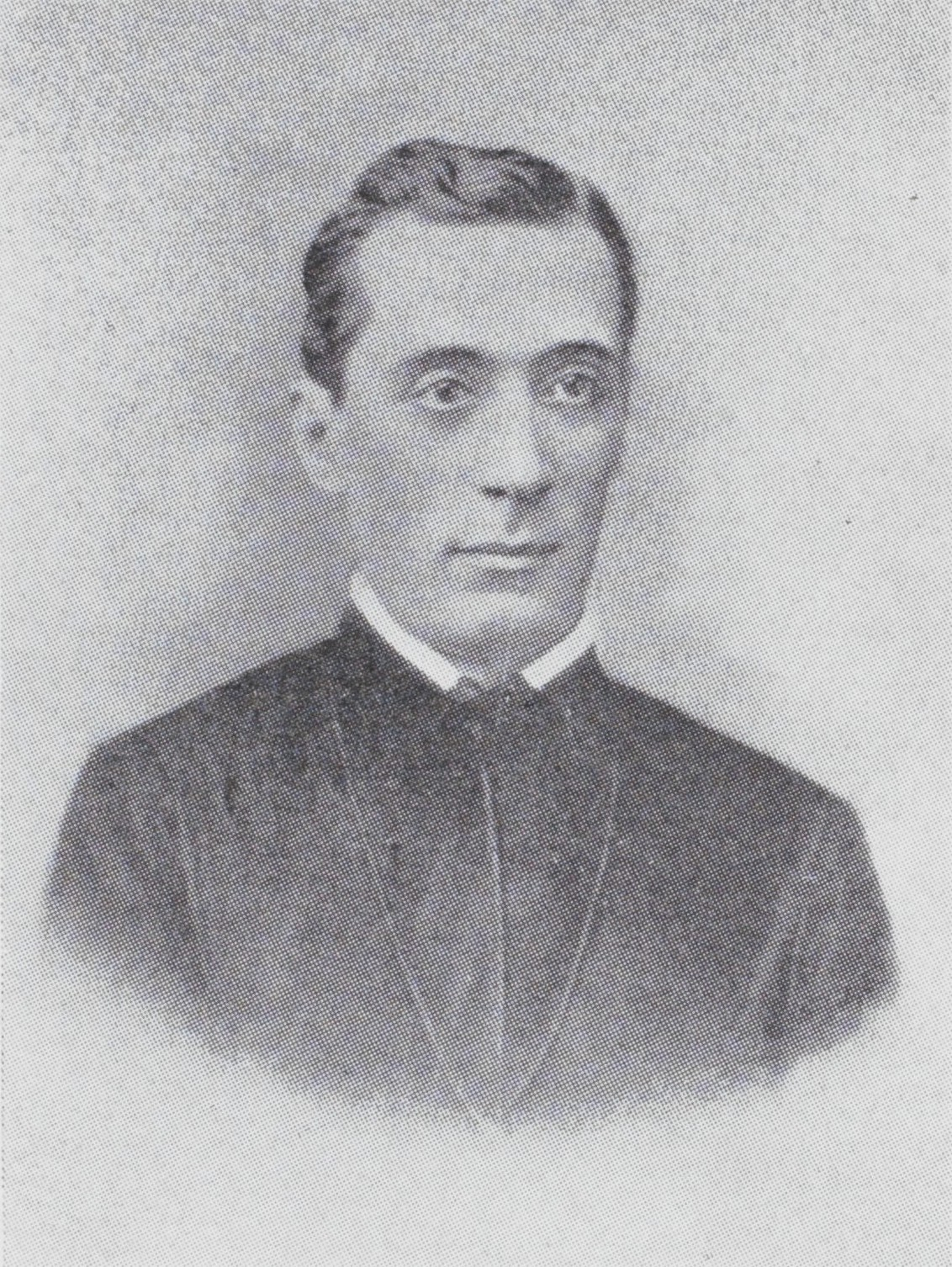
Nicholas Russo SJ

Russo, assisted by Rev. Aloysius Romano, converted a rented saloon on Elizabeth Street into a small chapel. In the late 19th century Elizabeth Street was filled with tenement buildings, largely populated by Italian immigrants, making the street part of Little Italy of lower Manhattan.

They named the chapel Missione Italiana della Madonna di Loreto. The first Mass was held on August 16, 1891, the Feast of San Rocco. Campbell was the main celebrant, with Russo delivering the sermon in Italian. The parishioners were mainly Neapolitans, Sicilians, and Calabrians, each speaking their own dialect.

In 1892, Russo purchased two tenements across the street, and after renovations, the new church, located at 303 and 305 Elizabeth Street, was dedicated by Corrigan on September 27 under the title Our Lady of Loreto.

A parochial school for girls opened in October 1895 and one for boys in 1898. To involve the young men in the parish he started the St. Aloysius Club; he also began devotions to the Sacred Heart, a traditional Jesuit devotion that proved very popular.

Russo died on April 1, 1902, at the age of fifty-six at St. Vincent's Hospital of complications of pneumonia. He was buried from Our Lady of Loreto. Russo was succeeded by Aloysius Romano, who, in turn, was followed by William H. Walsh. Through the Barat Settlement House, Walsh and the Jesuit priests and brothers worked in close collaboration with diocesan priests of Nativity parish.

By 1926, the parish was staffed by diocesan clergy and religious and a brand new school and cultural center were built which included an auditorium with a professional stage on which some half-dozen full-scale operas were presented annually. In 1938, following the ravages of the Great Depression, the parish was forced to foreclose on the cultural center. Catholic Charities bought this property at 18 Bleecker Street and created the Holy Name Centre - a residence and employment center for homeless men. The theater remained a part of the property and in the 1950s and 1960s, was host to a number of Golden Glove tournaments. Daily Mass took place in a small chapel inside the building.

By the mid-1980s, the church building of Our Lady of Loreto fell into disrepair and the congregation had significantly diminished. The property where the church stood (just south of 18 Bleecker Street), was sold, and the parish was moved into the chapel of the Holy Name Centre.

== The Sheen Center ==
In 2011, the Holy Name Centre and Our Lady of Loreto parish were closed. Nearby Catholic parishes welcomed the few remaining parishioners, and services for the homeless continued at other Catholic Charities locations throughout New York City. The sacramental records of the former Loreto Mission are kept at the parish office of Most Holy Redeemer - Nativity.

Following extensive planning and renovations, The Sheen Center was opened in 2015 as the official Arts Center of the Archdiocese of New York and named for the Venerable Archbishop Fulton J. Sheen. The Sheen Center is one of New York City's popular venues for live performance rentals, having housed performances by local and international musicians, dance companies, and off-Broadway theater productions. The center features a proscenium theater, an 80-seat black box theater (Frank Shiner Theater); a multi-track recording studio; four rehearsal studios; and the Janet Hennessey Dilenschneider Gallery for art exhibitions.

== Barat Settlement House ==
In 1905, the Barat Settlement House was established on Elizabeth Street as a branch of the Mission of Our Lady of Loretto. Initially it was founded to provide girls of the Mission with a way to earn a living other than by working in factories. Members of the Children of Mary from the Academy of Convent of the Sacred Heart in Manhattanville rented space on East Houston Street, and assisted by teachers, taught the children after school hours. In 1911, the Settlement acquired new headquarters at 221 Chrystie Street. A children's daycare was soon established, as well as the St. Martha's Society which taught all manner of domestic skills such as housekeeping, cooking, sewing, and home economics.

The Settlement House strove to meet the religious and social needs of the people by providing Sunday Mass, catechetical instruction, clubs for boys, sodalities for girls, the Barat men's club for young business men, and the St. Madeleine Sophie Barat Club for young business women. In 1934 social worker Dorothy Farrell Gormley was a director of the Barat Settlement House on Chrystie Street. She was from a family of wealthy socialites heavily involved in charitable causes.
