= The Battle (Rambaud novel) =

1997 novel by Patrick Rambaud

- First edition
- Author: Patrick Rambaud
- Original title: La Bataille
- Translator: Will Hobson
- Cover artist: Édouard Detaille, Lasalle's last charge at Wagram - 1912
- Language: French
- Genre: Historical novel
- Publisher: Edition Grasset et Fassquelle (France), Grove Press (US translation)
- Publication date: 1997 (English translation 2000)
- Publication place: France
- Media type: Print (Hardback & Paperback)
- Pages: 313 p.
- ISBN: 0-8021-1662-0

The Battle (French: La Bataille) is a historical novel by French author Patrick Rambaud which was first published in 1997. The English translation by Will Hobson appeared in 2000. The book describes the 1809 Battle of Aspern-Essling between the French Empire under Napoleon and the Austrian Empire. The action in the novel follows closely historical observations and descriptions as seen from the French perspective. La Bataille is the first book of a trilogy by Rambaud about the decline of Napoleon, describing his first personal defeat in a European battle. The other two books cover Napoleon’s defeat in Russia in The Retreat and his banishment at Elba in Napoleon’s Exile (published as The Exile in the United Kingdom).

== Historical background ==
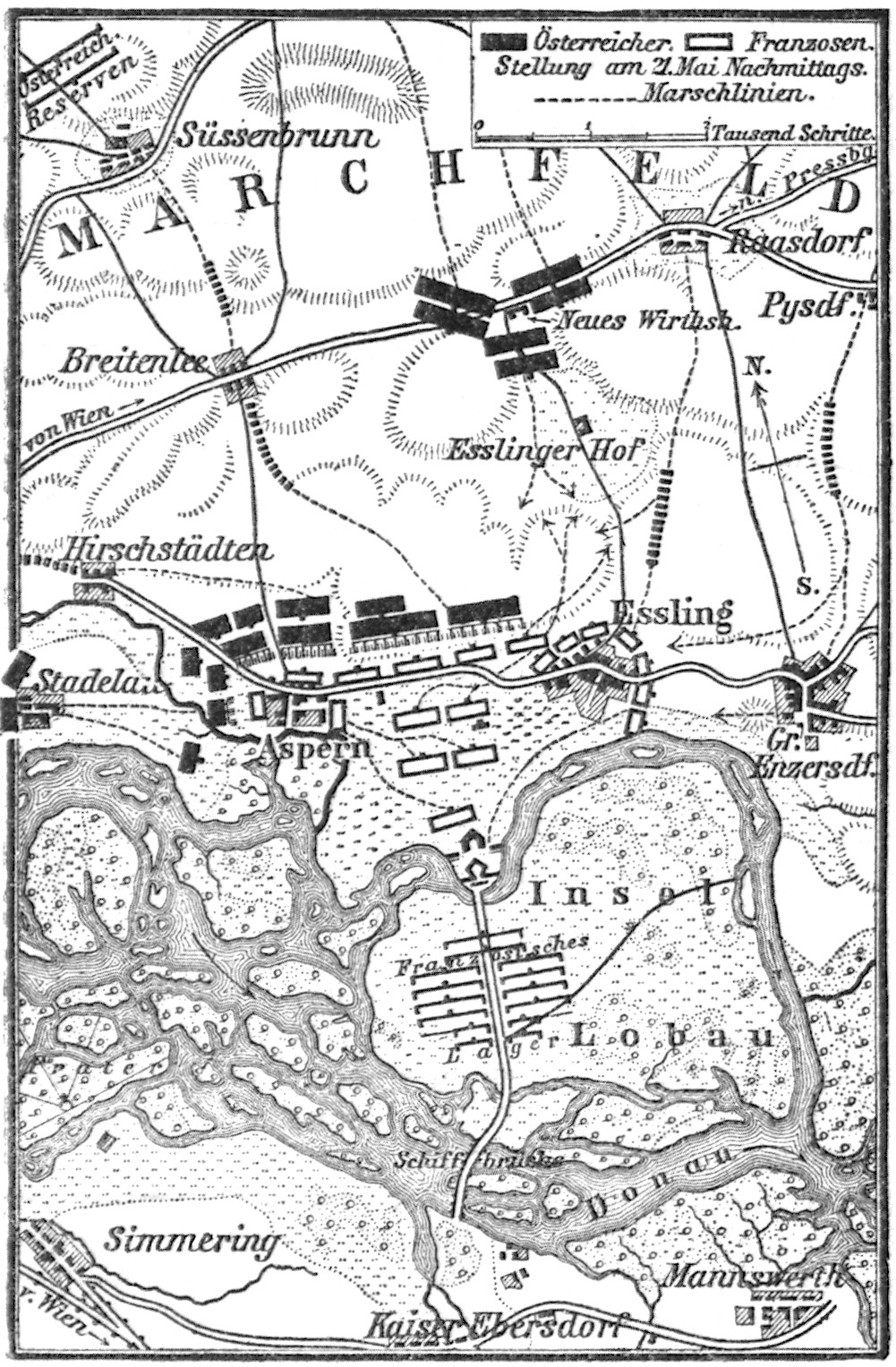
Diagram of the battle of Aspern-Essling, 1809

In the War of the Fifth Coalition Austria and Great Britain sought to reduce French dominance on the continent. Napoleon, however, succeeded militarily in Southern Germany and entered Vienna on May 13, 1809. The main Austrian army under Archduke Charles retreated to the eastern shore of the Danube. Napoleon chose to cross the Danube south of Vienna at Lobau island. He directed the construction of a pontoon bridge to cross to the eastern side where he occupied the villages of Aspern and Essling (today part of Vienna).

On May 21–22, 1809 Austrian forces attacked the French foothold and beat them back. Their success was in part due to their ability to break the bridge and disrupt Napoleon’s attempts to bring reinforcements across the river. The two-day battle was very costly, with over 40,000 fatalities. It was Napoleon's first personal defeat in a European battlefield. He recovered, however, and was able to beat the Austrian army at Wagram in July, and subsequently dictated his conditions at Treaty of Schönbrunn.

== The book ==
The book has seven chapters. The first two cover the days prior to the battle, the middle four chapters deal with the day and night of each of the two days of battle, and the last one with the immediate aftermath of the "hecatomb". Historical notes are attached.

The narration picks up the action in Vienna on May 16, 1809 and introduces colonel Louis-François Lejeune, a professional soldier and officer of the General Staff; he and Napoleon are the pivotal characters of the novel. As a liaison officer, Lejeune has access to Napoleon and his entourage. Napoleon is shown "as a foul-mouthed, callous bully, driven by vanity and detested even by his closest comrades." The book describes Napoleon's preparations for the battle, his hasty and ultimately disastrous decision to build a pontoon bridge across the raging Danube, and his often tense relationship with his subordinates, among them André Masséna, Pierre Daru, Jean-Baptiste Bessières, Louis-Alexandre Berthier, Jean Boudet, Jean-Baptiste Marbot, and the fatally wounded Jean Lannes. The two-day battle is described in gory detail, including the mass murder of hundreds of prisoners. Lejeune’s friend is Henry Beyle, later known as Stendhal, who, afflicted with syphilis, remains in Vienna as an observer; they both have a common love interest in Anna Krauss, an Austrian woman.

== Balzac's "La Bataille" ==
The novel is based on a concept by Honoré de Balzac, who in the 1830s made notes and preparations for a novel to be titled La Bataille, in which he intended to describe the Battle of Aspern-Essling. Upon visiting the battlefield in 1835, Balzac wrote to his future wife that he wanted to depict the battle with "all the horrors and all the beauties" so that the reader felt himself to be present in it. The work was never completed. Rambaud suggests that Balzac was interested in this particular battle as here the "nature of war" changed. Not only did the battle damage Napoleon's prestige, but afterwards nationalistic movements started to develop all over Europe. The Battle of Aspern-Essling gives a glimpse of the senseless horrors and slaughters of wars to come.

== Historical accuracy ==
Rambaud studied French sources closely and follows the battle with accuracy. The main characters are based on real people with few exceptions. The gentle fusilier Paradis and the brutal cuirassier Fayonne are contrasting representative characters, and Anna Krauss, the love interest of Lejeune and Beyle, is a fictional person; also, the friendship between Lejeune and Stendhal is an artistic device. Friedrich Staps attempted to kill Napoleon not in May but on October 12, 1809.

== Reception ==
It is generally acknowledged that the battle has been well researched and described vividly; the novel received prestigious awards. There is some critique that the viewpoint was strictly from the French side—although it could be argued that not knowing the other side is a realistic presentation of the fog of war—and that the love affair was "weak". Anna Mundow found the novel "astonishing" with excellent distillation of the historical events, while Jeff Waggoner complained that the novel was short on characterization.

== Awards ==
- Prix Goncourt, 1997
- Grand Prix du roman de l'Académie française, 1997
