= Jeremiah O'Connor =

Jeremiah O'Connor may refer to:

- Jeremiah O'Connor (priest) (1841–1891), American Jesuit educator and President of Boston College
- Jeremiah F. O'Connor (1933–2020), American politician who served in the New Jersey State Senate
