= McEleney =

McEleney is a surname. Notable people with the surname include:

- John J. McEleney (1895–1986), American Catholic prelate and academic
- Justine McEleney (born 1994), British beauty pageant winner
- Patrick McEleney (born 1992), Irish footballer
- Shane McEleney (born 1991), Irish footballer
