= Joseph D. FitzGerald =

American Jesuit and educator

Joseph D. FitzGerald S.J.

3rd President of Fairfield University
- In office 1951–1958
- Preceded by: James H. Dolan
- Succeeded by: James E. FitzGerald

Personal details
- Born: March 9, 1899 Lawrence, Massachusetts, U.S.
- Died: September 22, 1974 (aged 75) Worcester, Massachusetts, U.S.
- Education: Boston College

Joseph Denis FitzGerald, S.J. (March 9, 1899 – September 22, 1974) was an American Jesuit and academic. He served as the third president of Fairfield University located in Fairfield, Connecticut, from 1951 to 1958.

== Biography ==
FitzGerald was born in 1899 in Lawrence, Massachusetts, and graduated from Boston College High School in 1917. He then attended Boston College for a year, before entering the Society of Jesus; he was ordained in June 1931. He held faculty positions at Boston College and College of the Holy Cross before being selected as president of Fairfield University in September 1951.

During FitzGerald's seven-year tenure as president of Fairfield University, the first class of the university graduated in 1951 and the university was admitted to fully accredited membership in the New England Association of Colleges and Secondary Schools (NEASC). Also, Loyola Hall was opened in 1955, Gonzaga Hall was opened in 1957, and Canisius Hall was opened in 1957. After his tenure as Fairfield University president, FitzGerald was regional director of Jesuit high schools for four years.

FitzGerald died in 1974 in Worcester, Massachusetts.

Academic offices
Preceded by James H. Dolan, S.J.	Fairfield University President; 1951–1958	Succeeded by James E. FitzGerald, S.J.
