= James E. FitzGerald =

American Jesuit and educator

James E. FitzGerald S.J.

4th President of Fairfield University
- In office 1958–1964
- Preceded by: Joseph D. FitzGerald
- Succeeded by: William C. McInnes

Personal details
- Born: July 23, 1906 Providence, Rhode Island, U.S.
- Died: January 25, 1969 (aged 62) Boston, Massachusetts, U.S.
- Education: La Salle Academy
- Alma mater: Weston College; Saint Louis University

James Edgar FitzGerald, S.J. (July 23, 1906 – January 25, 1969) was an American Jesuit and academic. He served as the fourth president of Fairfield University located in Fairfield, Connecticut, from 1958 to 1964.

== Biography ==
FitzGerald was born in Providence, Rhode Island, in 1906. He graduated from La Salle Academy in his hometown, began his Society of Jesus studies in 1923, and studied philosophy at Weston College in Massachusetts during 1927–1930. He taught at Boston College during 1930–1932, then in 1932 returned to Weston College to study theology.

FitzGerald was ordained in 1935, and received a Master of Education degree from Saint Louis University in Missouri in 1938. He then taught at the College of the Holy Cross in Worcester, Massachusetts, during 1938–1940, and served as the college's prefect during 1948–1958.

During 1958–1964, FitzGerald served as president of Fairfield University. During his tenure, Alumni Hall was opened in 1959, the Graduate Department of Education became the Graduate School of Education in 1963, and Campion Hall was opened in 1964. After his time at Fairfield, FitzGerald took a role in Boston as prefect of studies for Jesuits in the New England area.

FitzGerald died in Boston in 1969, aged 62. He was survived by two brothers, both also priests, and two sisters, one a nun.

Preceded by Joseph D. FitzGerald, S.J.	Fairfield University President; 1958–1964	Succeeded by William C. McInnes, S.J.
