= Thomas H. Stack =

American Jesuit

The Reverend Thomas H. Stack SJ
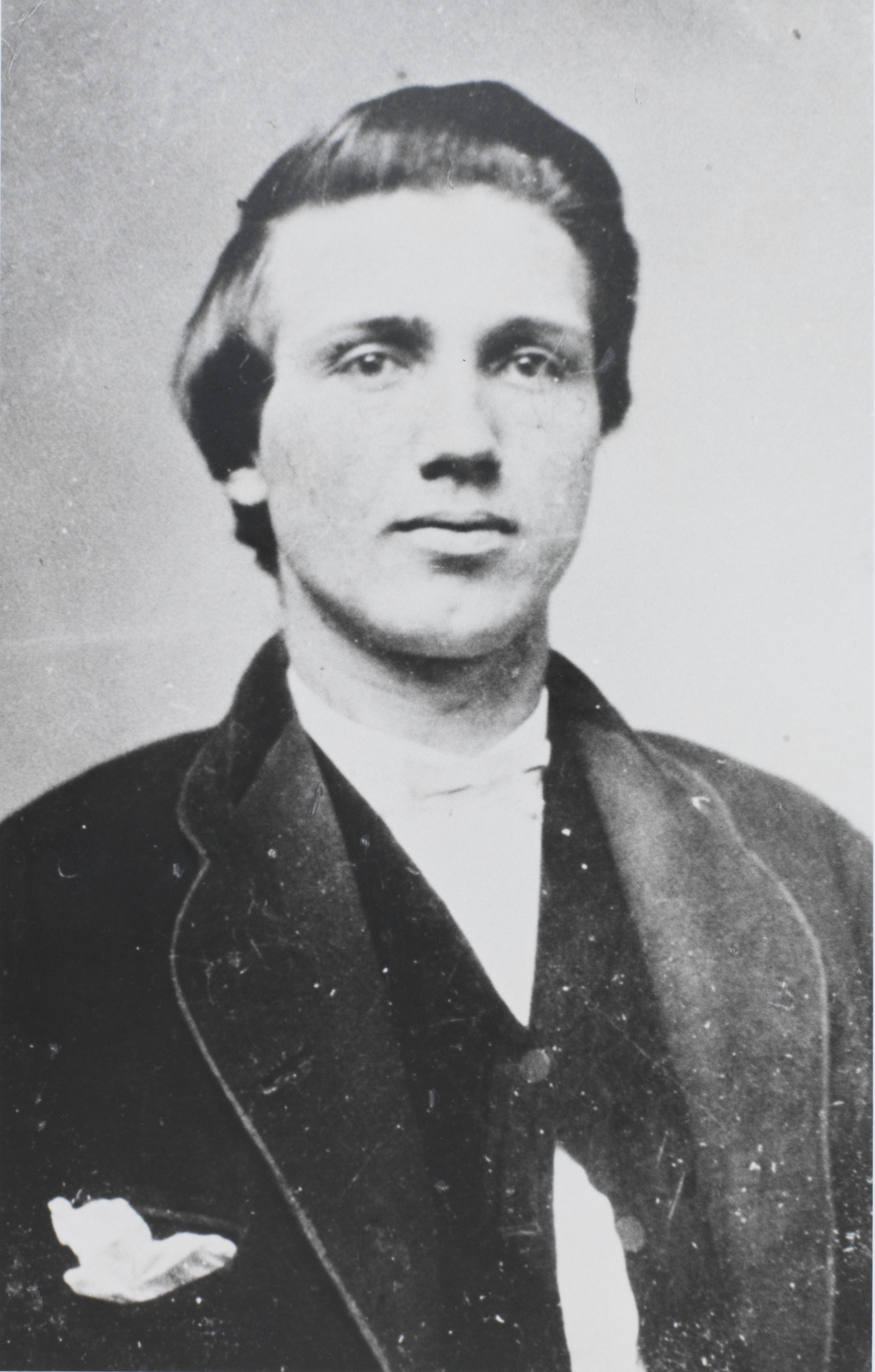
- Stack in 1872

6th President of Boston College
- In office August 5, 1887 – August 30, 1887
- Preceded by: Edward V. Boursaud
- Succeeded by: Nicholas Russo

Personal details
- Born: July 3, 1845 Union, Virginia, U.S. (Note: Today, Union is located in the State of West Virginia.)
- Died: August 30, 1887 (aged 42) Boston, Massachusetts, U.S.
- Education: Virginia Military Institute; Georgetown College

Orders
- Ordination: 1881

Thomas H. Stack SJ (July 3, 1845 – August 30, 1887) was an American Catholic priest and Jesuit who served briefly as the president of Boston College in 1887. Born in present-day West Virginia, he studied at the Virginia Military Institute. After the outbreak of the Civil War, he enlisted in the Confederate States Army in 1863, serving as an artilleryman and then in the signal corps until 1865. He enrolled at Georgetown College in 1866, and entered the Society of Jesus in 1868.

Stack then taught physics and chemistry at Georgetown, Boston College, and the College of the Holy Cross, before being appointed the president of Boston College in 1887. He held the office for less than one month before becoming ill and dying.

== Early life ==
Thomas H. Stack was born on July 3, 1845, in Union, Virginia (located in present-day West Virginia). He enrolled in the Virginia Military Institute, but his studies were halted due to the outbreak of the Civil War in 1861, and Stack enlisted in the Confederate States Army on December 16, 1863. Holding the rank of private, he was first assigned as an artilleryman, and on March 3, 1864, transferred to the signal corps. He is last recorded as an enlisted member of the Confederate Army on January 7, 1865.

Following the end of the war, Stack went on to resume his studies at Georgetown College in Washington, D.C., in 1866. He decided to enroll at Georgetown after hearing its president, Bernard A. Maguire, preach in Virginia. Stack completed his studies in 1868, and entered the Society of Jesus on September 1 of that year. He was eventually ordained a priest in 1881.

== Academic career ==
Stack served variously as a professor of physics at Georgetown College, at the College of the Holy Cross, and on three separate occasions at Boston College. He also taught chemistry at Boston College, and became the first faculty moderator of The Stylus of Boston College, a magazine founded in 1883. He was a member of the Georgetown College board of directors from 1884 to 1885.

On August 5, 1887, Stack succeeded Edward V. Boursaud as the president of Boston College. During his presidency, he also served as pastor of the Church of the Immaculate Conception in the South End of Boston. His tenure was very short-lived, as he became severely ill with a fever on August 22, and died on August 30. Nicholas Russo was appointed as the vice rector and president of the school.

== Notes ==
Academic offices
Preceded by Edward V. Boursaud	6th President of Boston College; 1887	Succeeded by Nicholas Russo
Catholic Church titles
Preceded by Edward V. Boursaud	7th Pastor of the Church of the Immaculate Conception; 1887	Succeeded by Nicholas Russo
