= Patrick Rambaud =

French writer (born 1946)

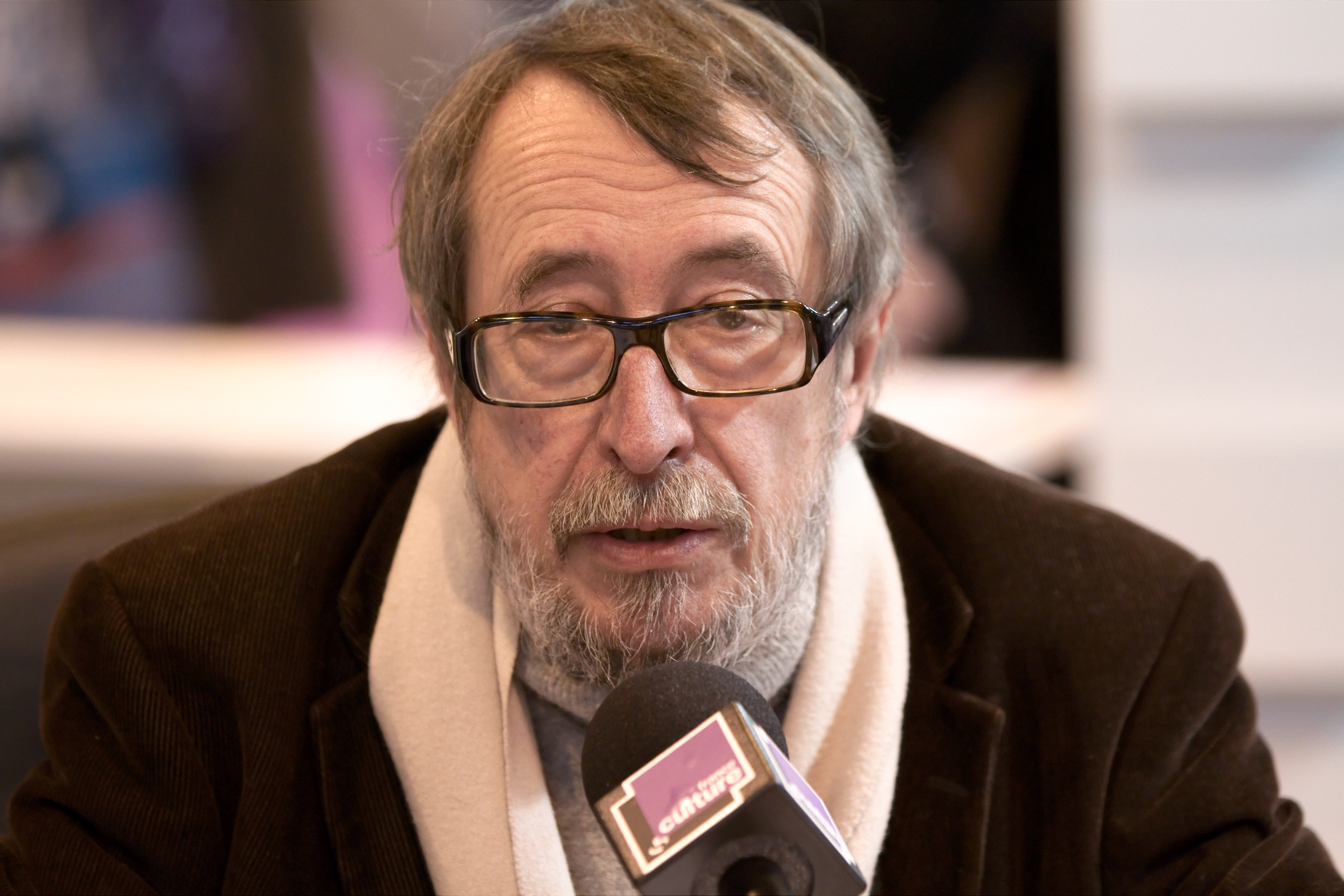
- Born: April 21, 1946 Paris, France
- Occupation: Writer
- Notable awards: Prix Goncourt (1997); Grand Prix du Roman of the Académie française (1997)

Patrick Rambaud (born 21 April 1946) is a French writer.

== Life ==
Born in Paris, France, with Michel-Antoine Burnier, he wrote forty pastiches (satirical novels). He wrote Le Journalisme sans peine (Editions Plon, 1997). In 1970, he helped found the iconic magazine Actuel. In 2008, he was elected a member of L'Académie Goncourt, succeeding Daniel Boulanger. He remained a member for fourteen years, resigning the position in December 2022 for reasons of ill heath, and becoming an Honorary Member.

== Awards ==
Rambaud received these awards for his book The Battle:

- 1997 Prix Goncourt
- 1997 Grand Prix du Roman of the Académie française

== Works ==
=== English translations ===
- The Battle (translator Will Hobson). London: Picador, 2000; New York: Grove Press, 2001.
- The Retreat (translator Will Hobson). London: Picador, 2004; New York: Grove Press, 2004.
- The Exile (translator Shaun Whiteside). London: Picador, 2005; Napoleon's Exile. New York: Grove Press, 2006.

=== Publications in French ===
- Les Complots de la liberté, 1832, Grasset, 1976; with Michel-Antoine Burnier
- Parodies, Balland, 1977; with Michel-Antoine Burnier; parodies of Simone de Beauvoir, Per Jakez Hélias, Marguerite Duras, Louis Aragon, Henry de Montherlant, Gilles Deleuze and Félix Guattari, André Malraux, Samuel Beckett, Emmanuelle Arsan, Boris Vian, François Mallet-Joris and Philippe Sollers, François Mitterrand, Roland Barthes, André Breton, Françoise Sagan, Maurice Clavel, Gérard de Villiers, Charles de Gaulle
- Fric-frac, Grasset, 1984
- La Mort d'un ministre, Grasset, 1985
- Comment se tuer sans avoir l'air, La Table Ronde, 1986
- Virginie Q., Balland, 1988; under the pseudonym Marguerite Duraille
- Le Visage parle., Balland, 1988
- Elena Ceausescu: carnets secrets, Flammarion, 1990
- Ubu président, Robert Laffont, 1990
- 1848, Grasset, 1994
- Les Mirobolantes Aventures de Fregoli, Robert Laffont, 1991
- Le Gros Secret: mémoires du labrador de François Mitterrand, Calmann-Levy, 1996; under the pseudonym Baltique
- Mururoa mon amour, Lattès, 1996; under the pseudonym Marguerite Duraille
- La Bataille, Grasset, 1997; reprint Librairie générale française, 1999
- Le Journalisme dans peine, Plon, 1997
- Les Aventures de mai, Grasset, 1998
- Il neigeait, Grasset, 2000; reprint Librairie générale française, 2002
- Bernard Pivot reçoit…, Grasset, 2001
- Comme des rats, Grasset, 2002
- L'Absent, Grasset, 2003
- Le Sacre de Napoléon, 2 décembre 1804, Michel Lafon, 2004
- L'Idiot du village, Grasset, 2005
- Le Chat botté, Grasset, 2006
- La Grammaire en s'amusant, Grasset, 2007
- Chronique du règne de Nicolas Ier, Grasset, 2008; chronicles the first six months of Sarkozy's presidency, in pastiche of Saint-Simon)
- Deuxième chronique du règne de Nicolas Ier, Grasset, 2009
- Troisième chronique du règne de Nicolas Ier, Grasset, 2010
- François le Petit, Grasset, 2016
- Chronique d'une fin de règne, Grasset, 2017
- Quand Dieu apprenait le dessin, Grasset, 2018
- Emmanuel le Magnifique, Grasset, 2019
- Le Roman du canard, Points, 2019
- Les Cinq Plaies du Royaume, Grasset, 2020
- Morituri, Grasset, 2022
