= James H. Dolan =

American Jesuit and educator

The Very Reverend James H. Dolan SJ
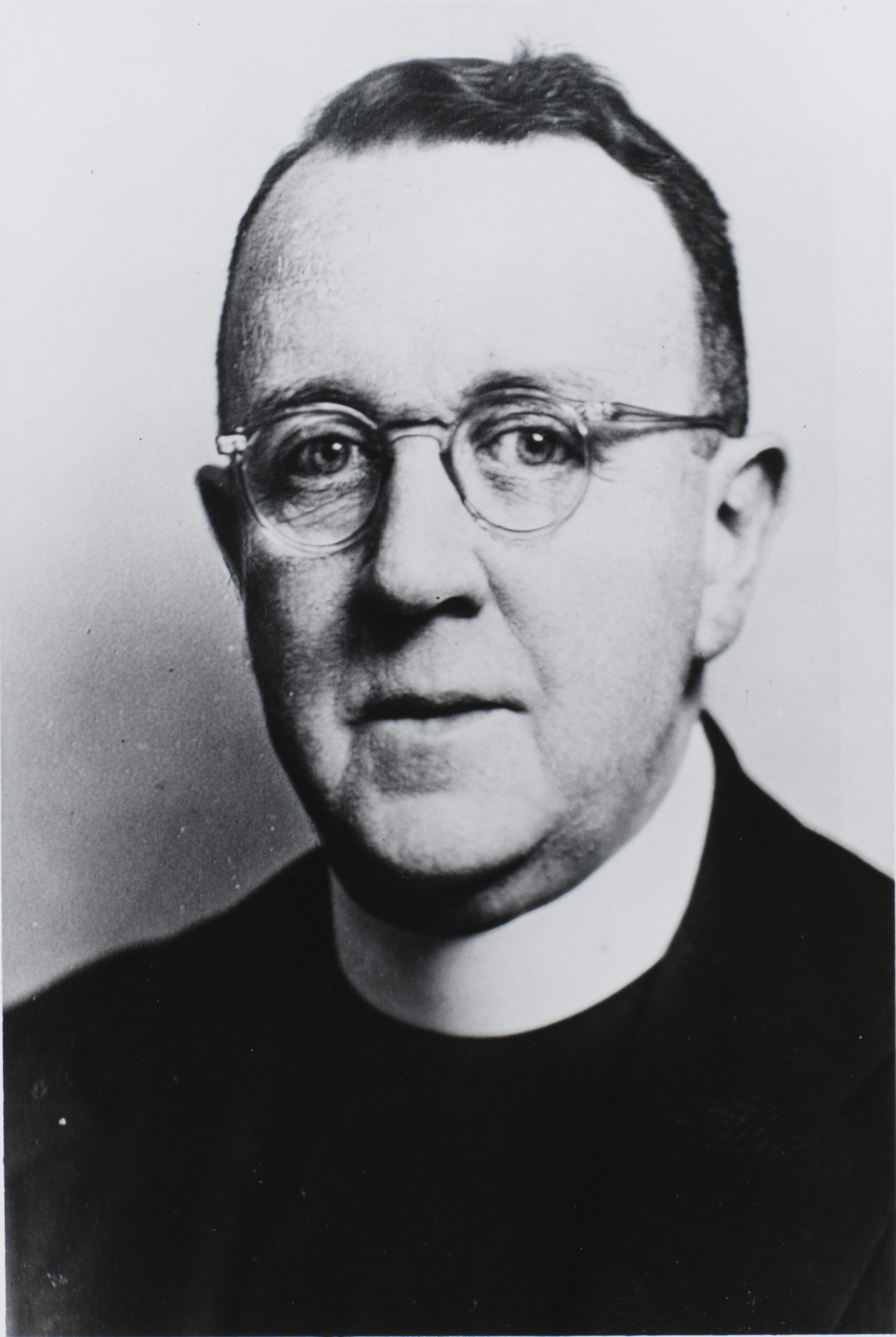
- Dolan c. 1925

16th President of Boston College
- In office 1925–1932
- Preceded by: William J. Devlin
- Succeeded by: Louis J. Gallagher

2nd President of Fairfield University
- In office 1944–1951
- Preceded by: John J. McEleney
- Succeeded by: Joseph D. FitzGerald

Personal details
- Born: June 4, 1885 Roxbury, Massachusetts, U.S.
- Died: August 1, 1977 (aged 92) Weston, Massachusetts, U.S.
- Education: Boston College; Woodstock College

Orders
- Ordination: June 28, 1920 by James Gibbons

James Henry Dolan SJ (June 4, 1885 – August 1, 1977) was an American Jesuit and educator. He served as president of Boston College from 1925 to 1932, and later was one of the founders of Fairfield University, serving as its second president from 1944 to 1951.

== Early life ==
Dolan was born on June 4, 1885, in Roxbury, Massachusetts, to James B. Dolan and Ellen T. Dolan (née Mulry). He was educated at St. Joseph's Parochial School in Roxbury and then at Boston College High School. In 1904, Dolan matriculated at Boston College. At the end of his freshman year, Dolan decided to enter the Society of Jesus, proceeding to the Jesuit novitiate of St. Andrew-on-Hudson in Poughkeepsie, New York, on August 14, 1905.

From 1907 to 1909, Dolan remained at St. Andrew-on-Hudson to complete his juniorate, and then went to Woodstock College in Maryland, where he studied philosophy until 1912. Afterwards, Dolan taught Latin to junior and senior high school students and freshman and sophomore students at Georgetown University until 1917.

In 1917, Dolan returned to Woodstock College to study theology. On June 28, 1920, he was ordained a priest by Cardinal James Gibbons at Dahlgren Chapel of the Sacred Heart at Georgetown University. In 1912, Dolan returned to St. Andrew on Hudson for one year to complete his tertianship. Afterwards, he then became a professor of philosophy and then psychology at the College of the Holy Cross in Massachusetts.

== Boston College ==
On August 23, 1925, Dolan succeeded William J. Devlin as the president of Boston College. Construction on Bapst Library had begun in September 1924, but was paused due to lack of funds. During the beginning of his presidency, Dolan collected additional donations, which allowed the resumption of construction of the building.

== Biography ==
Dolan was president of Boston College 1925 to 1932, where he founded the Boston College Law School, and was the Provincial Superior of the New England Jesuit Province from 1937 to 1944.

During Dolan's seven-year tenure at Fairfield University, the State of Connecticut chartered the school to grant degrees in 1945. In 1947, the College of Arts and Sciences admitted its first class of 303 male students. The State of Connecticut accredited the College of Arts and Sciences and the university held its first summer session of undergraduate courses in 1949.

From October 1951 until January 1972, Dolan lived at Boston College, serving as director of construction and new building in the Province and as revisor of the Province finances. He also taught classes while at Boston College: from 1951 until 1956 he taught natural theology and psychology and from 1956 until 1965 he served as confessor of students at the college.

In 1972, due to ill health, Dolan moved to the Campion Center, Weston, Massachusetts, where he died on August 1, 1977, aged 92.

Academic offices
Preceded by William J. Devlin	16th President of Boston College; 1925–1932	Succeeded by Louis J. Gallagher
Preceded by John J. McEleney	2nd President Fairfield University; 1944–1951	Succeeded by Joseph D. FitzGerald
