= Robert J. Fulton =

American priest; president of Boston College

The Reverend Robert J. Fulton SJ
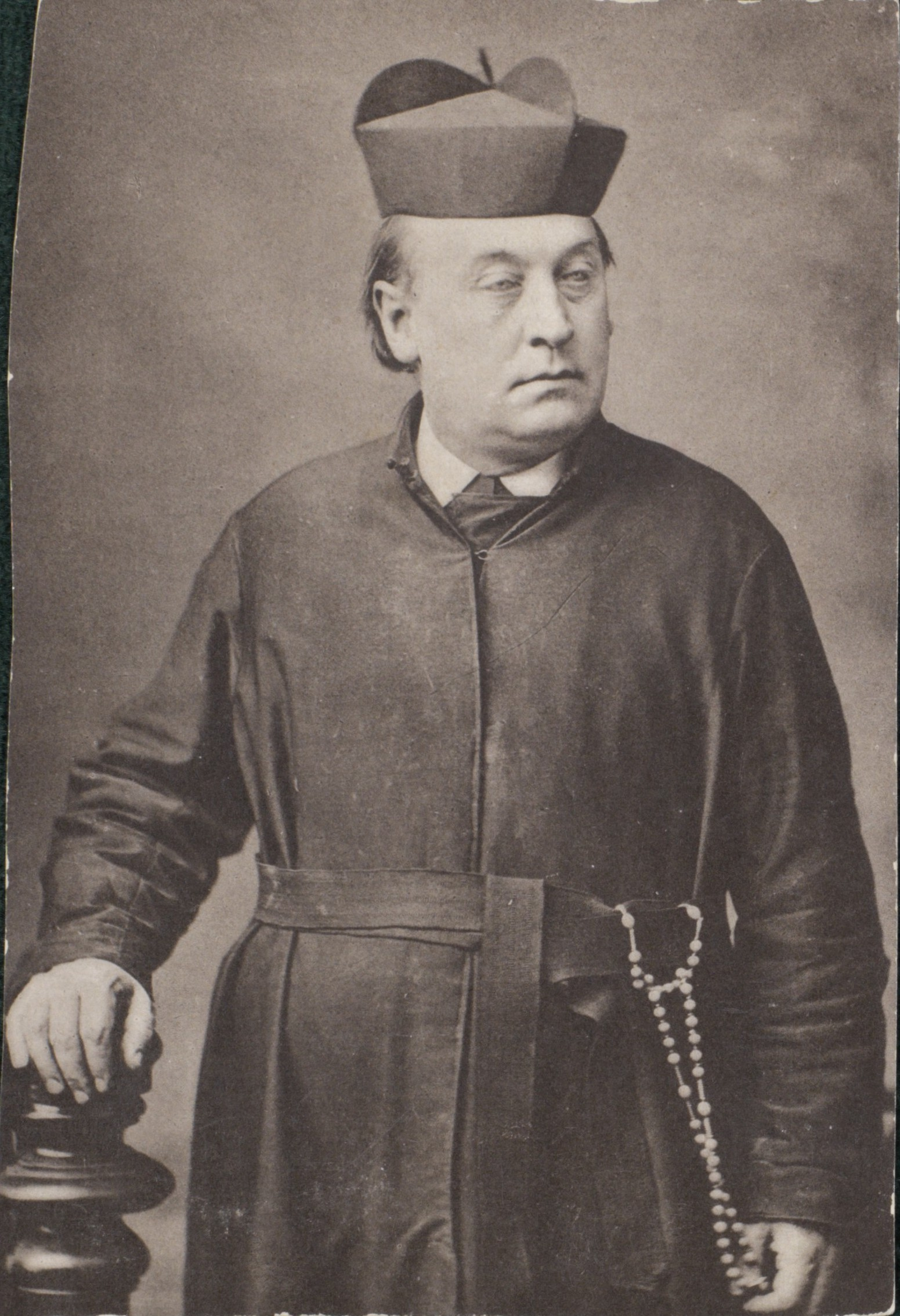
- Fulton c. 1880

3rd & 8th President of Boston College
- In office 1888–1891
- Preceded by: Nicholas Russo
- Succeeded by: Edward I. Devitt
- In office 1870–1880
- Preceded by: Robert W. Brady
- Succeeded by: Jeremiah O'Connor

Personal details
- Born: Robert James Fulton; June 28, 1826 Alexandria, District of Columbia, U.S.
- Died: September 4, 1895 (aged 69) Santa Clara, California, U.S.
- Resting place: Santa Clara Mission Cemetery
- Education: Georgetown College

Orders
- Ordination: July 25, 1857 by Francis Kenrick

Robert James Fulton SJ (June 28, 1826 – September 4, 1895) was an American Catholic priest and Jesuit who twice served as the president of Boston College, from 1870 to 1880 and 1888 to 1891. He was influential in the early years of Boston College, as he was in charge of all the school's academic affairs.

Fulton was born and educated in the District of Columbia, including at Georgetown College. He entered the Society of Jesus in 1843, and taught at Jesuit institutions throughout Washington, Maryland, and Massachusetts. He eventually became the first prefect of studies at the newly founded Boston College, overseeing the school's teachers and curriculum. In 1870, Fulton became the president of the college. He oversaw expansion of its facilities, and founded what would later be named the Fulton Debating Society.

In 1882, Fulton became the provincial superior of the Jesuit Maryland-New York Province, and was made the canonical visitor to the Irish Province in 1886. In 1888, Fulton returned to Boston College as president, overseeing further expansion and the separation of Boston College High School. He died at Santa Clara University in 1895. Fulton Hall and the Fulton Debating Society at Boston College are named for him.

== Early life ==
Robert James Fulton was born on June 28, 1826, in the city of Alexandria, then located in the District of Columbia. Both of Irish descent, his father was Presbyterian and his mother was Catholic. His paternal ancestors had emigrated to the United States in the 18th century and initially settled near Harrisburg, Pennsylvania. His maternal ancestors were of the O'Brien clan from County Clare and initially settled near Baltimore, Maryland. Among his relatives were the president of the United States, Benjamin Harrison, and the governor of Virginia, Henry A. Wise. Fulton attended his mother's church for the first years of his life, and when his father sought to have him instead attend his Presbyterian church, Robert protested and his father reluctantly acquiesced.

Fulton's father was wealthy but encountered significant financial difficulty soon before his father's death, when Fulton was seven years old, leaving his widow and son poor. In order to support the family, Fulton's mother opened a small, private school, which she ran, and later opened a boarding house. Fulton attended his mother's school for a time.

When he was nine years old, Fulton enrolled at a school in Washington, D.C. Through a relative, Senator William S. Fulton of Arkansas, Fulton was appointed a Page of the United States Senate, a position he held for four years. He explored various occupations, first attempting to study medicine with several books and instruments he borrowed from a physician. He then decided to seek entrance to the United States Military Academy at West Point. In preparation for this, he enrolled at Georgetown College at 16 years of age. Fulton likely worked at the college during his studies to remit part of his tuition.

While at Georgetown, Fultondecided that he would enter the Jesuit order. Upon hearing this, his mother decided that she would also enter religious life. They both rid themselves of their possessions, including manumitting their slaves, and then Fulton entered the Society of Jesus on September 1, 1843, at the novitiate in Frederick, Maryland, while his mother entered the Georgetown Visitation Monastery, taking the name Sister Olympias.

== Academic career ==
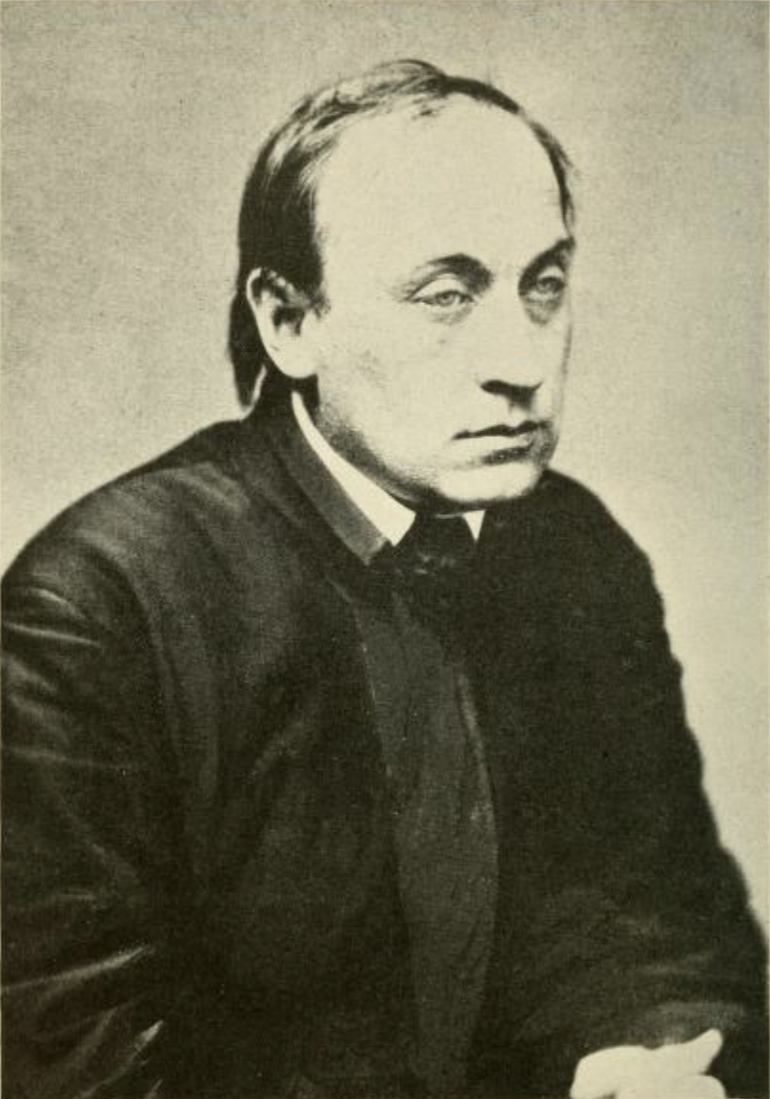
Portrait of Fulton in 1876

After his novice year in the Society of Jesus, Fulton taught at Saint John's College in Frederick for three years. He then taught for a year each at Georgetown College and the Washington Seminary. Fulton began his study of philosophy at Georgetown in 1849, but in 1850 was sent to teach for one year each at the College of the Holy Cross in Massachusetts, Georgetown, and Loyola College in Maryland. He completed his philosophical studies at Georgetown in 1853, and studied theology from 1854 to 1857. On July 25, 1857, Fulton was ordained a priest by Francis Kenrick, the Archbishop of Baltimore, at Georgetown.

Fulton completed his theological studies in 1858, and was then appointed a professor of rhetoric at Georgetown. He completed his tertianship in 1861, and in March of that year, was sent to Boston College to teach a course on moral theology to the Jesuit scholastics. On August 15, 1862, he professed his fourth vow. From 1862 to 1863, he again taught rhetoric in Frederick.

=== Early years of Boston College ===
In 1863, Fulton returned to Boston. He engaged in pastoral work at the Church of the Immaculate Conception in the South End. On September 5, 1864, Boston College admitted the first class of 22 lay students, a number Fulton considered to be lackluster. Fulton was the first prefect of studies, overseeing the teachers and the education of these students. He had exclusive control over the academic affairs of the school, even though he was not the president, and personally taught many of the classes himself. Shortly after the establishment of the college, Fulton founded and was the first president of the Senior Debating Society, which renamed itself the Fulton Debating Society of Boston College on November 7, 1890. The debating society's room in Gasson Hall, named the Fulton Room, opened on November 19, 1913. In 1867 or 1868, he wrote a code of rules for the teachers of the school.

Upon his retirement as the first president of the college in 1869, John Bapst recommended to the Jesuit Superior General that Fulton succeed him. Yet, Robert W. Brady was chosen as the school's second president.

==== First presidency ====
On August 2, 1870, Fulton succeeded Brady as the vice-rector and president of Boston College and the pastor of the Church of the Immaculate Conception. Once the Jesuits considered the school fully established in 1872, Fulton was promoted to rector. In October 1870, Fulton created a cadet corps, with the help of Major General John G. Foster of the United States Army, which became called the Foster Cadets. Though its creation was initially well received, when Fulton required that all students, many of whom were from poor families, purchase the military uniform, nearly half of the 142 students enrolled left the school, including all the upperclassmen. Eventually, the cadet corps was discontinued during Fulton's presidency.

From 1874 to 1875, the college building was physically moved 60 feet and was significantly expanded. It included an enlarged library, a gymnasium, and space for a new organization that Fulton would found in 1875, the Young Men's Catholic Association, which would focus on recreation for working Catholic men in Boston. The academic year of 1876 and 1877 was the first in which Boston College offered the final course in philosophy.

Fulton's presidency was unusually long, as Jesuit colleges ordinarily permitted a president to serve only two three-year terms. His tenure eventually came to an end on January 11, 1880, and he was succeeded by Jeremiah O'Connor. Fulton was given only two days' notice from the provincial superior of the end of his presidency, and he was, unusually, made the prefect of studies and an assistant to O'Connor.

=== Pastor in New York ===
On May 13, 1880, Fulton left Boston College to become the pastor of the Church of St. Lawrence O'Toole in Manhattan (later known as the Church of St. Ignatius Loyola) on November 1, 1880, succeeding John Treanor. He oversaw the early construction of a rectory, and established a sodality for married men. In 1880, Fulton purchased a plot of land on 83rd Street for $7,500 (equivalent to approximately $209,000 in 2024), where the Loyola School would open 20 years later. He remained as pastor only a year, before being succeeded by David Merrick on June 21, 1881.

=== Gonzaga College ===
Fulton became the president of Gonzaga College and pastor of St. Aloysius Church in Washington, D.C., on June 21, 1881, succeeding Charles K. Jenkins. The school's finances were in a poor state, with the institution having a debt of around $192,000 (equivalent to approximately $5.4 million in 2024) and operating on a yearly deficit. During the course of his year in office, Fulton reduced the debt by approximately $100,000. Fulton's tenure came to an end in 1882 when he was promoted to provincial superior, and he was succeeded by John J. Murphy.

== Provincial superior ==
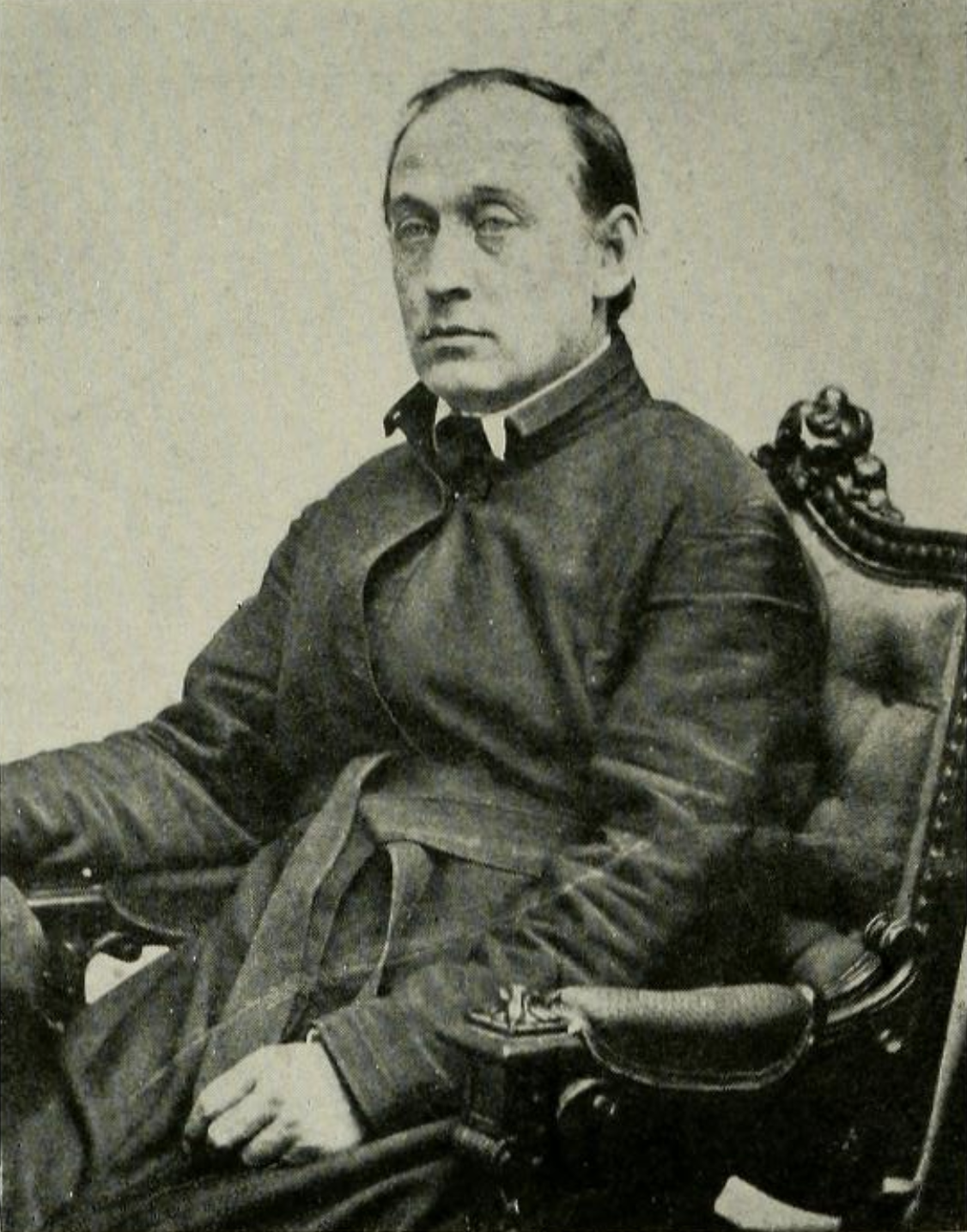
Portrait of Fulton

Fulton was named to succeed Robert W. Brady as the provincial superior of the Jesuit Maryland-New York Province, assuming office on May 28, 1882. As provincial, he attended the Jesuit General Congregation in Rome in 1883, which elected Anton Anderledy as the Superior General.

In December 1886, Anderledy made him the canonical visitor to the Jesuits' Irish Province. He remained as provincial superior of the Maryland-New York Province until he was succeeded by Thomas J. Campbell on May 21, 1888.

== Second presidency of Boston College ==
Fulton again returned to Boston College as president on July 4, 1888, succeeding Nicholas Russo. He raised $125,000 (equivalent to approximately $3.8 million in 2024) to expand the facilitates of the Young Men's Catholic Association, and construction began in 1889. Work was delayed due to strikes by the laborers, and the expansion was completed in 1890.

Upon the suggestion of the Archbishop of Boston, John Joseph Williams, Fulton separated an English high school division, as a distinct course of study, from the college in September 1889. The two institutions were further separated over the following years, giving rise to Boston College High School. By this time Fulton's health had begun to deteriorate. On October 16, 1890, he left for Hot Springs, Arkansas, to recuperate. When it became clear that his health was not improving, the provincial superior appointed Edward I. Devitt as vice-rector of the college on January 8, 1891, who assumed management of its affairs. Devitt officially succeeded Fulton as rector and president of the college on September 3, 1891.

== Later years ==
In his later years, Fulton spent time at Jesuit facilities in New York City, Philadelphia, and Washington, D.C. and was eventually named the chair of English literature at Georgetown, teaching postgraduate students. Soon, however, his health deteriorated further, and he was sent to recuperate in California. Once his health slightly improved, he traveled to San Francisco and finally to Santa Clara University. On the evening of September 4, 1895, he died at the university. He was buried in the Santa Clara Mission Cemetery.

Fulton Hall, named for Robert Fulton, opened in 1948, at Boston College's Chestnut Hill campus. It currently houses the Carroll School of Management.

Academic offices
Preceded by Robert W. Brady	3rd President of Boston College; 1870–1880	Succeeded by Jeremiah O'Connor
Preceded by Charles K. Jenkins	13th President of Gonzaga College; 1881–1882	Succeeded by John J. Murphy
Preceded by Robert W. Brady	12th Provincial Superior of the Jesuit Maryland-New York Province; 1882–1888	Succeeded by Thomas J. Campbell
Preceded by Nicholas Russo	8th President of Boston College; 1888–1891	Succeeded by Edward I. Devitt
Catholic Church titles
Preceded by Robert W. Brady	4th Pastor of the Church of the Immaculate Conception; 1870–1880	Succeeded by Jeremiah O'Connor
Preceded by John Treanor	11th Pastor of the Church of St. Lawrence O'Toole; 1880–1881	Succeeded by David Merrick
Preceded by Charles K. Jenkins	6th Pastor of St. Aloysius Church; 1881–1882	Succeeded by John J. Murphy
