= William J. Devlin =

American Jesuit and academic administrator

The Reverend William J. Devlin S.J.
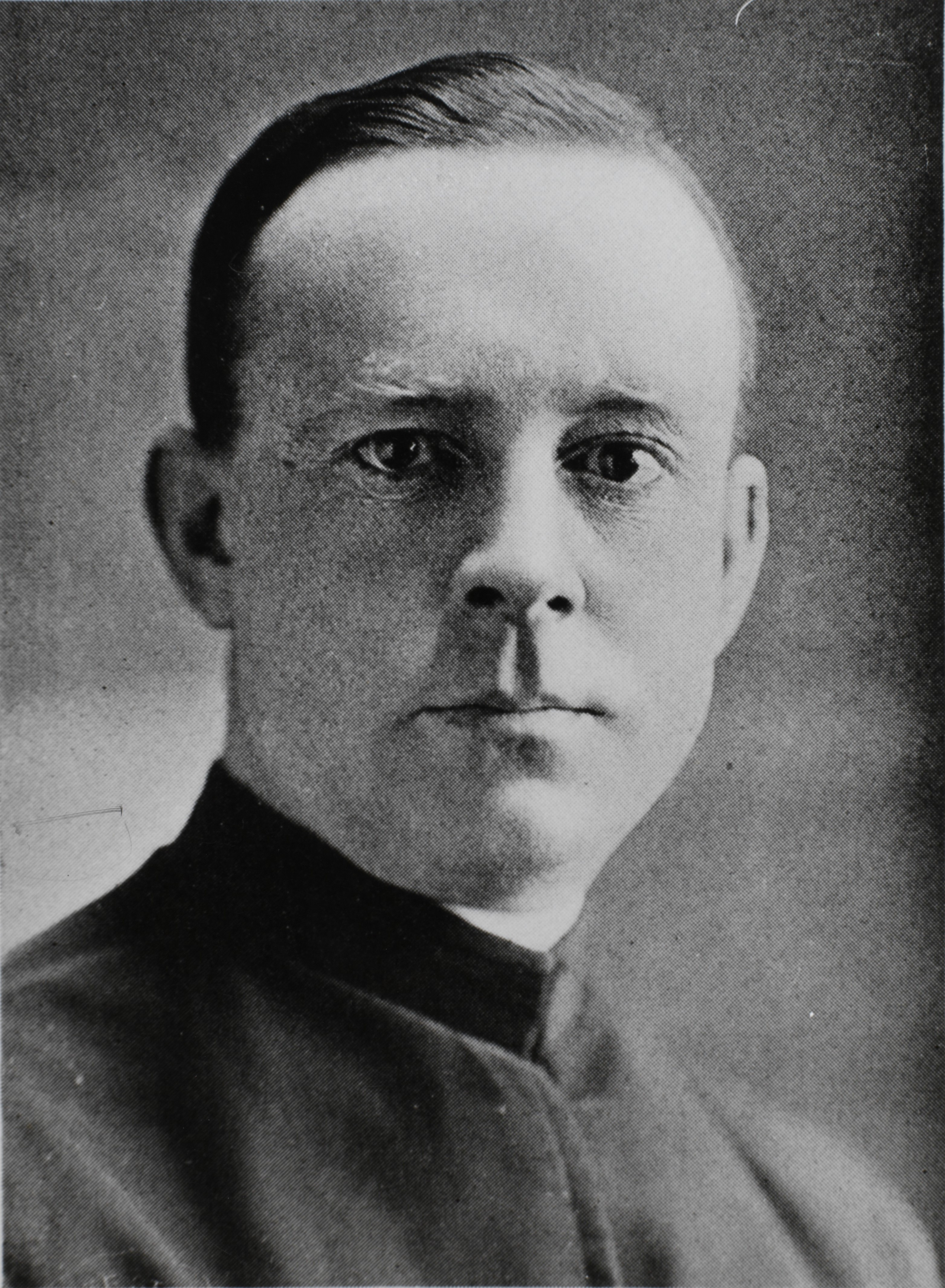
- William Devlin circa 1919

15th President of Boston College
- In office 1919–1925
- Preceded by: Charles W. Lyons
- Succeeded by: James H. Dolan

Personal details
- Born: December 15, 1875 New York City, U.S.
- Died: July 21, 1938 (aged 62) Wernersville, Pennsylvania, U.S.
- Education: Stonyhurst College; Woodstock College; St. Andrew-on-Hudson

Orders
- Ordination: 1908 by James Gibbons

William J. Devlin, S.J. (December 15, 1875 – July 21, 1938) was an American academic administrator, Catholic priest, and Jesuit. Born in New York City, he spent many of his early years in Europe, where he was educated at Stonyhurst College in England. Devlin entered the Society of Jesus in Maryland in 1893, and studied at Woodstock College. He became a professor at Boston College in 1910, and eventually became the dean.

In 1919, Devlin was appointed president of Boston College. His tenure was characterized by an extensive construction campaign, that resulted in several new buildings, including St. Mary's Hall, and the science building, which was later named Devlin Hall. These projects were supported by an ambitious fundraising campaign. He also made the first proposal for what would become Boston College's business school. His presidency came to an end in 1925, and he became the rector of St. Andrew-on-Hudson, a Jesuit novitiate in New York. He left St. Andrew-on-Hudson in 1933, and was made rector of the Church of St. Ignatius Loyola and president of Regis High School in Manhattan. Two years later, he became ill and eventually retired to the novitiate in Wernersville, Pennsylvania, where he died in 1938.

== Early life ==
William J. Devlin was born on December 15, 1875, in New York City. His father, Jeremiah Devlin, was a successful merchant tailor. His had one brother, Joseph Angelo Devlin, who became a physician and the chief of staff of Misericordia Hospital in New York, and two sisters, Angela Devlin and Mary Devlin.

Devlin began his education at the De La Salle Institute in New York City, during which time he also served as the personal altar boy to Archbishop Michael Corrigan in St. Patrick's Cathedral. He was then sent to be educated at Stonyhurst College in Lancashire, England, and did not return to the United States for many years, spending his summer vacations traveling throughout Europe or visiting family in Ireland. At the end of his sophomore year, while on a return voyage to the United States in the summer of 1893, he learned that his father had died. As a result, though he already been accepted into the England Province Society of Jesus pending his completion of one more year at Stonyhurst, a Jesuit at St. Francis Xavier College in New York advised him not to return to Stonyhurst. Instead, Devlin applied for membership in the Jesuits' Maryland-New York Province, and was accepted.

=== Jesuit formation and teaching ===
He proceeded to the Jesuit novitiate in Frederick, Maryland, on September 24, 1893. He then spent his scholasticate teaching in Boston from 1901 to 1905. Beginning in September 1905, he studied theology at Woodstock College in Maryland. There, he was ordained a priest by Cardinal James Gibbons in 1908. He then studied during his tertianship at St. Andrew-on-Hudson in Poughkeepsie, New York. In 1910, he began teaching rhetoric and philosophy at Boston College, and eventually became prefect of studies. He was made dean of Boston College in 1914.

== Rectorships of Boston College and St. Andrew-on-Hudson ==
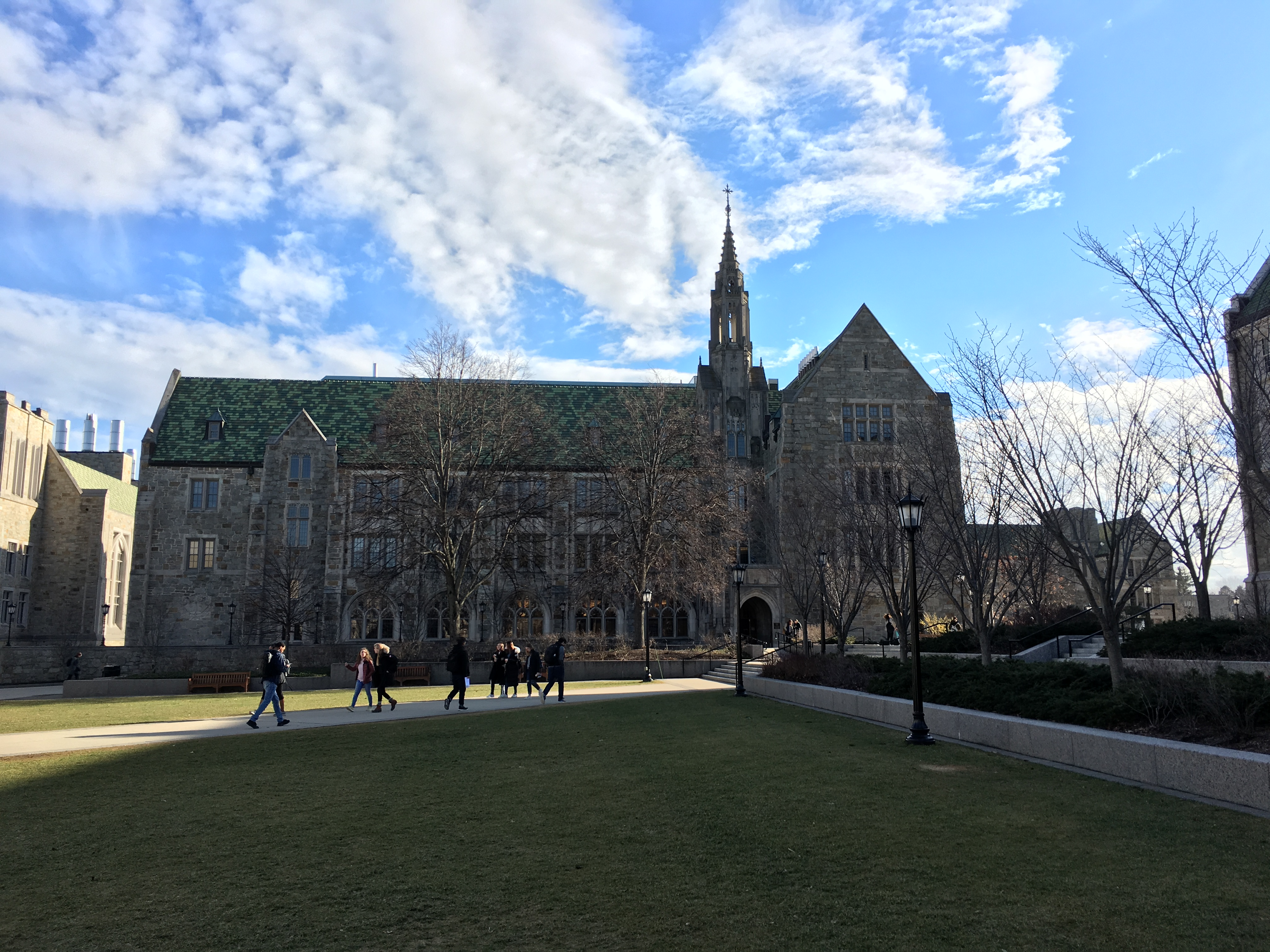
Devlin Hall at Boston College was completed in 1924.

Devlin became the rector and president of Boston College in 1919, succeeding Charles W. Lyons. Soon after taking office, he received Cardinal Désiré-Joseph Mercier, the Archbishop of Mechelen, on campus. Devlin's presidency was characterized by a substantial building campaign, which resulted in his nickname of the "builder of the super-structures". He oversaw the completion of the construction begun under his predecessors, and began construction on a new science building, on which ground was broken on March 16, 1922. At the same time, he oversaw the start of work on a new library, as well as St. Mary's Hall. To fund the construction of the science building, he initiated a fundraising campaign to raise $500,000 (equivalent to $9.62 million in 2025). That campaign grew into an effort to raise money generally for construction on campus, including for a chapel, gymnasium, and the library. He worked with Cardinal William O'Connell, the Archbishop of Boston, to raise $2 million. This involved assembling a large team of volunteers to solicit donations from the Catholics of Greater Boston; this was aided by public statements of support from Vice President Calvin Coolidge; the Secretary of War, John W. Weeks; Senators David I. Walsh and Henry Cabot Lodge; and Governor Channing H. Cox. The campaign fell short of its goal but raised $1 million. The science building was completed in 1924 and was later named Devlin Hall.

From 1921 to 1922, Devlin served as consultor to the Jesuit provincial superior. In 1921, he became one of the three founding members of the Jesuits' New England Province, which separated from the Maryland-New York Province. Around 1922, he established the Summer School for Catholic Sisterhoods, which educated religious sisters, and paid visits to a nearby orphanage. The School of Education began awarding advanced degrees in 1919. In 1922, the first proposal was made for the creation of what would become the College of Business Administration. Toward the end of his term, he objected to the recruitment by the College of the Holy Cross of a student and football player at Boston College High School. His presidency came to an end in 1925, and he was succeeded by James H. Dolan.

In 1925, Devlin became minister at St. Andrew-on-Hudson, the Jesuit novitiate in Poughkeepsie, New York. After only a year, he became minister at Woodstock College and then returned to St. Andrew-on-Hudson as rector in 1927. His tenure as rector ended in 1933.

== Later years ==
In 1933, Devlin became rector of the parish of St. Ignatius Loyola, the president of Regis High School, and the president of Loyola School, all located on the Upper East Side of Manhattan, succeeding Edward J. Sweeney. However, after two years, he became ill, and resigned the positions. He was succeeded by W. Coleman Nevils. He spent two years in Misericordia Hospital in New York and at St. Agnes Hospital in Philadelphia. When his health improved, he went to Saint Isaac Jogues Novitiate in Wernersville, Pennsylvania, on April 17, 1936, which he previously had a role in founding in 1930.

He continued participating in the communal activities at the Jesuit house until July 1937. He suffered a stroke on November 9, 1937, which left him immobile. On July 21, 1938, Devlin died of heart disease at the novitiate in Wernersville. His funeral and requiem mass, held at the novitiate on July 23, were attended by many Jesuit dignitaries, including Bishop Thomas Addis Emmet.

Academic offices
Preceded by Charles W. Lyons	15th President of Boston College; 1919–1925	Succeeded by James H. Dolan
Preceded by –	Rector of St. Andrew-on-Hudson; 1927–1933	Succeeded by –
Preceded by Edward J. Sweeney	6th President of Regis High School; 1933–1935	Succeeded by W. Coleman Nevils
Preceded by Edward J. Sweeney	8th President of Loyola School; 1933–1935	Succeeded by W. Coleman Nevils
Catholic Church titles
Preceded by Edward J. Sweeney	Rector of the Church of St. Ignatius Loyola; 1933–1935	Succeeded by W. Coleman Nevils
