= Nicholas Russo =

Italian Jesuit educator and philosopher (1845–1902)

The Reverend Nicholas Russo SJ
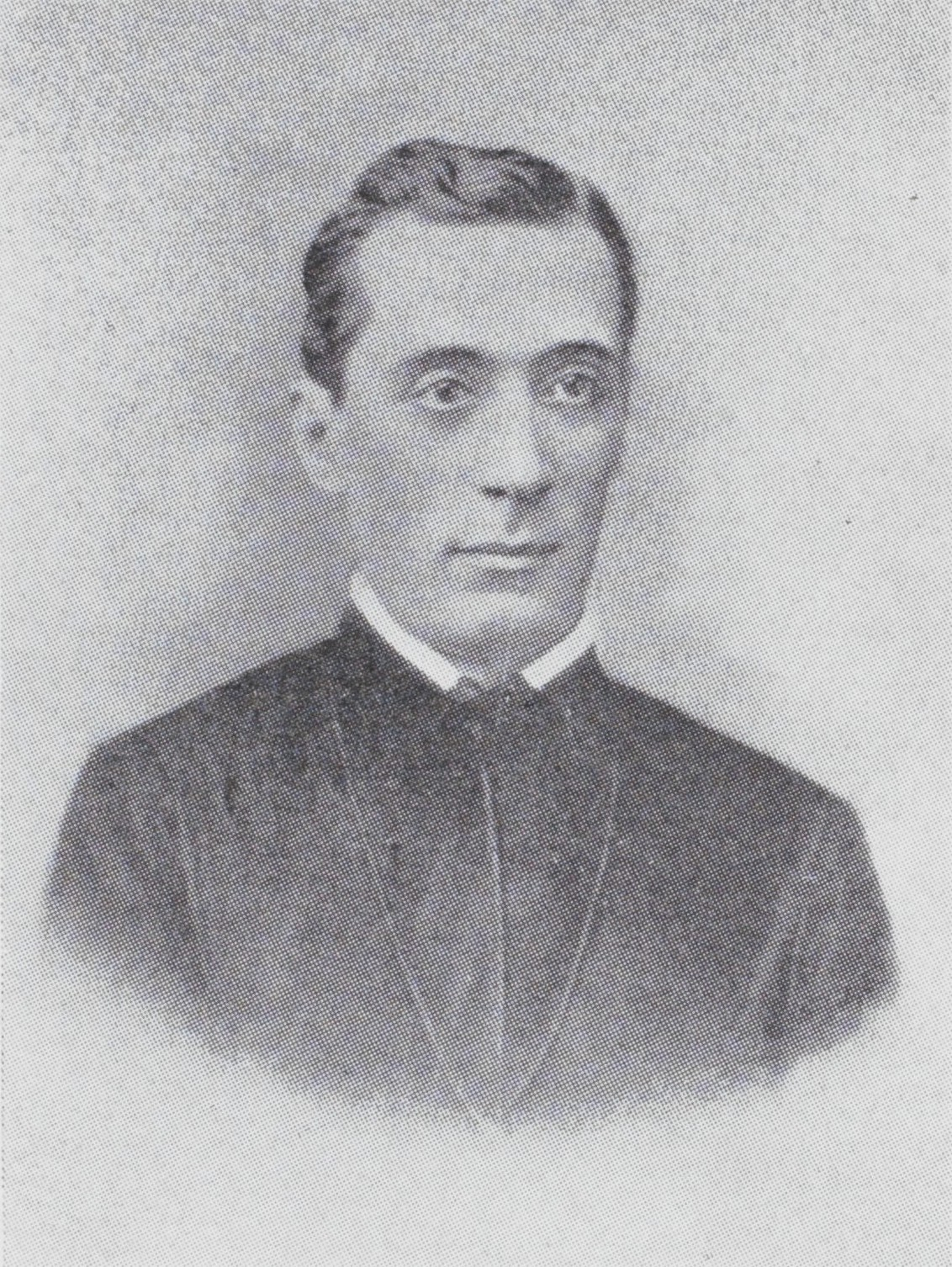
- Russo, c. 1888

7th President of Boston College
- In office 1887–1888
- Preceded by: Thomas H. Stack
- Succeeded by: Robert J. Fulton

Personal details
- Born: April 24, 1845 Ascoli Piceno, Marche, United Provinces of Central Italy
- Died: April 1, 1902 (aged 56) New York City, US
- Education: Woodstock College

Orders
- Ordination: 1877

Philosophical work
- Era: 19th-century philosophy
- School: Scholasticism; Thomism

Nicholas Russo SJ (April 24, 1845 – April 1, 1902) was an Italian Catholic priest, Jesuit, philosopher, and missionary.

Born in Italy, he ran away from his family and joined the Society of Jesus in France in 1862, where he was educated and began teaching. In 1875, Russo was sent to the United States to study at Woodstock College. For ten years, he was a professor and the chair of philosophy at Boston College and became its first faculty member to publish a book. Specializing in Thomism, he was regarded as a successful professor. He served as president of the college from 1887 to 1888.

In the 1890s, Russo left a successful career in academia to minister for more than ten years to the Italian immigrants in New York City's Lower East Side, who faced poverty and discrimination by local priests. He founded the Church of Our Lady of Loreto in 1891, which grew to 3,000 weekly parishioners, as well as schools for boys and girls and parochial clubs and sodalities.

== Early life ==
Nicholas Russo was born on April 24, 1845, in Ascoli Piceno in the United Provinces of Central Italy, today located in the Marche region of central Italy. (Note: Several sources list his birthplace as Ascoli Satriano, in the Apulia region of southern Italy.) His mother died when Russo was a young child. His father was a prominent physician in the town. Russo excelled in school, especially in Latin and Ancient Greek. When he reached the age of six, Russo expressed an interest in entering religious life and, with one of his sisters, made pilgrimages to shrines and observed the Catholic feasts and days of abstinence. Intending Nicholas to also become a physician, Russo's father had Nicholas attend surgeries with him, and a nurse assisted Nicholas and his sister keep their religious practices secret from Russo's father.

Russo desired to enter the Society of Jesus but feared that his father would not permit him to do so. Thus, on August 8, 1862, telling no one but his sister, Russo ran away from home. With two friends, he traveled on foot to France, begging for food and shelter along the way, and ultimately entering the Jesuit novitiate in Pau on September 7, 1862. They were accepted on probationary status and Russo was instructed to obtain the consent of his family. Russo never saw his family again, but received a letter from his father, who was on his deathbed, approving of Russo's decision to enter the Jesuits, and the superiors permitted him to continue his Jesuit formation. Russo's father died shortly thereafter.

After professing his vows, Russo went to Saint-Acheul for two years to complete his juniorate. He then proceeded to Vals for his philosophical studies. Afterwards, he spent five years as a grammar teacher and the prefect at the Jesuit college in Saint-Affrique.

== Academic career ==
In 1875, the Jesuit province of Naples sent Russo to the United States for his theological studies, and he proceeded to Woodstock College in Maryland. He excelled during his time as a student. Russo was ordained a priest in 1877, and in September of that year, he was sent to Massachusetts to teach logic and metaphysics at Boston College. He remained in this position for nearly ten years, becoming the chair of philosophy, and taking a reprieve only for the academic year of 1872 to 1873, to complete his tertianship in Frederick, Maryland. Russo was also the college librarian, and, during the physical enlargement of the library in 1876, he and another Jesuit instituted an accurate card catalogue.

During his time at Boston College, Russo published his first book, Summa Philosophica, comprising philosophy lectures he had delivered to students. With this, he became the first member of the Boston College faculty to publish a book while associated with the institution. As a teacher, he lectured in Latin, and was known as stern but effective. He also lectured on Catholicism and published his second book on the subject. Russo was well versed in the scholastic tradition, as well as Thomistic philosophy and theology. Given Pope Leo XIII's mandate that the Thomism should be taught at Catholic universities, Russo became a prominent teacher. One of his students was the future cardinal and archbishop of Boston, William Henry O'Connell, who wrote in an 1880 letter:

Certainly Father Russo is a stern teacher. He never speaks a word to a soul except as he speaks to all in class. He sits at the rostrum looking like some great medieval scholar — great black eyes, a lean sallow face, and a look which turns you into stone if you don't happen to know your lesson.

Russo professed his fourth vow on August 15, 1884.

=== President of Boston College ===
The president of Boston College, Thomas H. Stack, died suddenly on August 30, 1887, after just 17 days. There was not enough time to formally select a new rector, a lengthy process, before the start of classes in autumn. Therefore, Russo was appointed the vice-rector and seventh president to temporarily administer the institution. During his presidency, Russo was also the pastor of the Church of the Immaculate Conception in the South End of Boston. His tenure was uneventful, and after less than one year, Russo was succeeded by Robert J. Fulton on July 4, 1888.

== Ministry in New York City ==
Following his presidency, Russo became the procurator at St. Francis Xavier Church in New York City. He also was appointed "moderator of the cases of conscience" for the Archdiocese of New York, a position he held for the rest of his life. In 1889, Russo became a professor of philosophy at Georgetown University in Washington, D.C. It was there in 1889 that he published his third book, on ethics, completing his Jesuit philosophical education.

Russo returned to New York City, serving as operarius (Note: An operarius is a Jesuit who works as a priest away from his Jesuit community.) at the Church of St. Lawrence O'Toole (later known as the Church of St. Ignatius Loyola). He also wrote speeches and papers for the archbishop of New York, Michael Corrigan. On February 19, 1891, Russo presided over a conference at St. Patrick's Cathedral of all priests of the archdiocese, which discussed canon law, dogmatic theology, and moral theology.

=== Church of Our Lady of Loreto ===
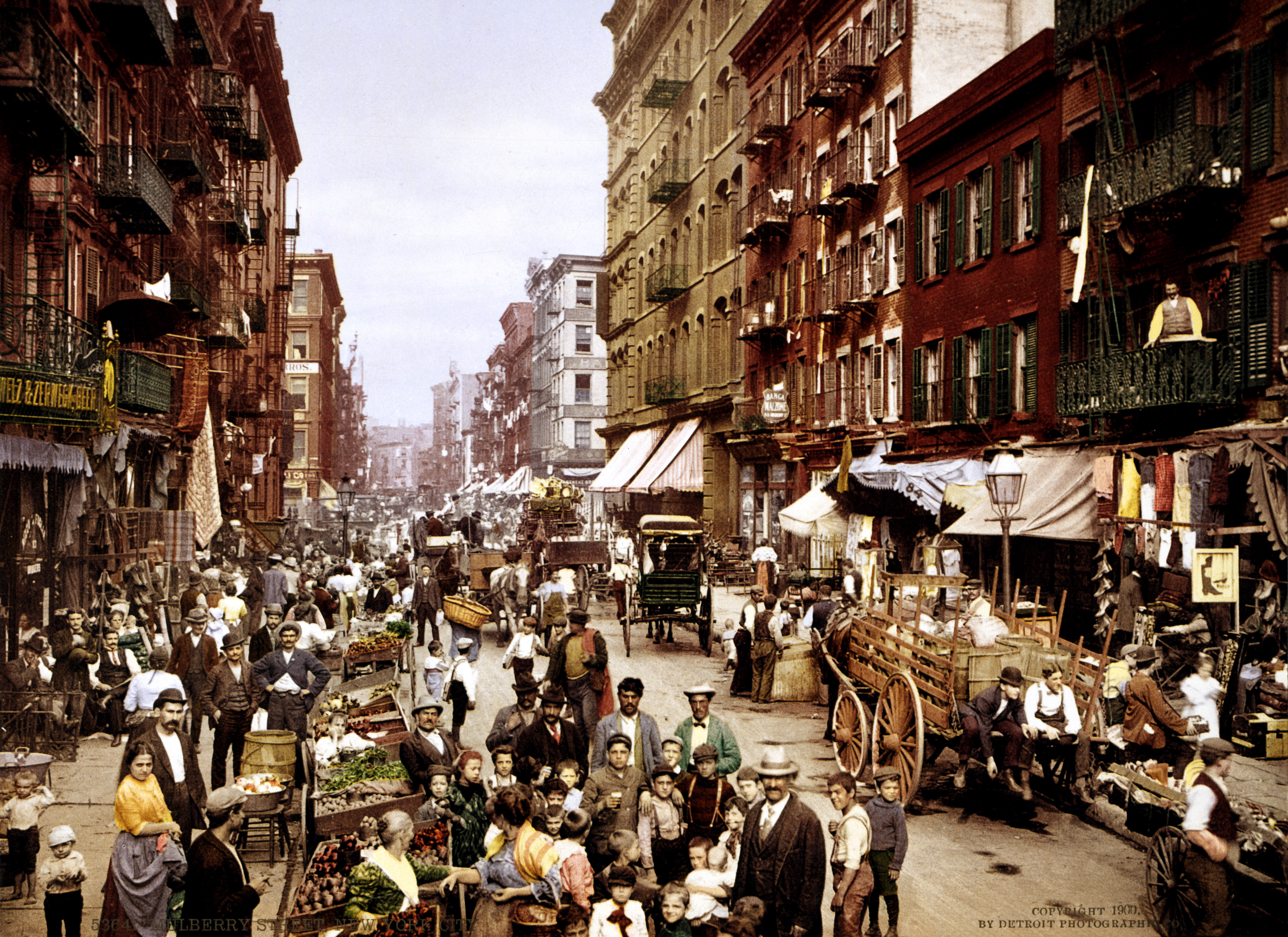
Manhattan's Little Italy c. 1900

As hundreds of thousands of Italian immigrants arrived in New York City, many settled in Little Italy in Lower Manhattan. The Jesuit Superior General urged Archbishop Corrigan to tend to their spiritual needs, and Corrigan enlisted the aid of various religious orders to establish churches for Italians throughout Manhattan. For the Lower East Side, he selected the Jesuits, and the Jesuit provincial superior, Thomas J. Campbell, selected Russo to lead the effort.

With that, Russo gave up a successful career in academia and spent the rest of his life ministering to poor Italian immigrants in New York City, who, he wrote, "worked like slaves" for subsistence wages. As one biographer noted, "It must have been, humanly speaking, no small sacrifice...for he had held high positions in Boston and New York and his work had lain almost entirely among the better instructed and wealthy."

When Russo arrived in New York, tensions between Italian immigrants and the city's predominantly Irish clergy had been building for some time, and Italians faced discrimination from local pastors. At St. Patrick's Old Cathedral, the pastor, John F. Kearney, created an Italian sub-congregation in 1882 that was almost entirely segregated from the rest of the parish. Italians were relegated to the basement to celebrate Mass and other sacraments, and Kearney eventually expelled the Italians from the church entirely. Russo first visited St. Patrick's in 1889, and Kearney refused to permit him to celebrate Mass in the main church for "reasons which a priest should feel ashamed to give," according to Russo. While Russo initially believed that the primary obstacle to the Italians' spiritual wellbeing was their own "indifference" to religion, after five years ministering to them, he concluded that neglect by clergy charged with their pastoral care was the foremost problem. As a result, Protestants actively worked to convert Italian immigrants.

Russo and another Italian Jesuit, Aloysius Romano, physically converted a rented barroom on Elizabeth Street it into a chapel holding about 150 people. They built an altar and two confessionals, cleaned the walls, painted, and named the chapel Missione Italiana della Madonna di Loreto. The first Mass was held in the chapel on August 16, 1891, the Feast of San Rocco, with Russo delivering the sermon in Italian and the provincial superior being the main celebrant. Tensions persisted, with Russo writing to Archbishop Corrigan about Kearney's continued hostility. With his congregation shrinking, Kearney reopened St. Patrick's to Italians, who became the majority of parishioners, depleting funds from Russo's indebted church.

Russo's parish soon outgrew its makeshift chapel, and in 1892, he purchased two tenement buildings across the street. After renovations, the new church was dedicated by Corrigan on September 27 under the name Our Lady of Loretto. The church, located at 303 and 305 Elizabeth Street, contained three altars. It accommodated 500 people seated and an additional 200 people standing.

Russo divided the basement of the church into classrooms, opening a school for 200 children. Due to poor conditions in the basement, after two months, he purchased two houses adjoining the church for $35,000 (equivalent to approximately $1.14 million in 2024), and renovated them for another $8,000. A new parochial school for girls opened in October 1895 and one for boys opened in 1898. By 1895, the schools enrolled 700 students. Russo also started two weekend clubs for younger and older boys and a sodality devoted to the Sacred Heart. Eventually, a third Jesuit from Sicily became a curate at the church.

On Easter in 1902, Russo's health deteriorated and he was taken to St. Vincent's Hospital, where it was found he had pneumonia with complications. He died on April 1, 1902, by which time the church drew 3,000 parishioners each Sunday. While it was intended that a Neapolitan Jesuit working in the Rocky Mountains replace Russo at Our Lady of Loreto, he was succeeded by William H. Walsh. Russo's funeral was held at Our Lady of Loreto, with the Mass celebrated by the provincial superior and the absolution of the dead prayed by Archbishop Corrigan.

== Published works ==
- Summa philosophica juxta scholasticorum Principia: complectens logicam et metaphysicam [Philosophical Summation Based on Scholastic Principles: Including Logic and Metaphysics] (in Latin). Boston: Thomas B. Noonan & Co. 1885. OCLC 7700707 – via Google Books.
- The True Religion and Its Dogmas. Boston: Thomas B. Noonan & Co. 1886. OCLC 893916100 – via Google Books.
- De philosophia morali: praelectiones quas in Collegio Georgiopolitano Soc. Jesu anno MDCCCLXXXIX-X [On Moral Philosophy: Lectures Delivered at Georgetown College of the Society of Jesus in the Year 1889-90] (in Latin). New York: Benziger Brothers. 1890. OCLC 8518644.

== See also ==
- Basilica della Santa Casa

== Notes ==
Academic offices
| Preceded by Thomas H. Stack | 7th President of Boston College; 1887–1888 | Succeeded by Robert J. Fulton |
Catholic Church titles
| Preceded by Thomas H. Stack | 8th Pastor of the Church of the Immaculate Conception; 1887–1888 | Succeeded by Robert J. Fulton |
| New office | 1st Pastor of the Church of Our Lady of Loreto; 1891–1902 | Succeeded by William H. Walsh |
