= John J. McEleney =

American prelate

The Most Reverend John Joseph McEleney S.J.
- Archbishop of Kingston in Jamaica
- See: Kingston in Jamaica
- Installed: February 29, 1956
- Term ended: September 1, 1970
- Predecessor: Office created
- Successor: Samuel Emmanuel Carter
- Other posts: Vicar Apostolic of Jamaica (1950–1956); President of Fairfield University (1942–1944)

Orders
- Ordination: June 18, 1930
- Consecration: April 15, 1950

Personal details
- Born: November 13, 1895 Woburn, Massachusetts, U.S.
- Died: October 5, 1986 (aged 90) Needham, Massachusetts, U.S.
- Denomination: Catholic Church
- Education: Boston College; Weston College; Woodstock College

John Joseph McEleney, S.J. (November 13, 1895 – October 5, 1986) was an American prelate of the Catholic Church. He was the first Bishop and first Archbishop of Kingston, serving between 1956 and 1970. Earlier, he served as the first president of Fairfield University (1942–1944) and as Vicar Apostolic of Jamaica (1950–1956).

== Biography ==
John McEleney was born in Woburn, Massachusetts, the only son among seven children of Charles H. and Bridget (née Gaffigan) McEleney. He attended local public schools, graduating from Woburn High School in 1914. He studied at Boston College, where he earned a Bachelor of Arts degree in 1918 and later a Master of Arts degree in 1924.

In 1918, McEleney entered the Society of Jesus, more commonly known as the Jesuits, at the novitiate in Yonkers, New York. He completed his classical studies at St. Andrew-on-Hudson Seminary in Hyde Park in 1921, and then studied philosophy at Weston College in Massachusetts and at Woodstock College in Maryland. From 1924 to 1927, he was a language professor at the Ateneo de Manila University in the Philippines. He then returned to Weston College, where he completed his theological studies in 1931.

On June 18, 1930, McEleney was ordained to the priesthood by Bishop John Peterson at Weston. He then served as assistant master of novices at the Shadowbrook novitiate in Lenox until 1934, when he was sent to study ascetical theology at North Wales in the United Kingdom. He resumed his post at Shadowbrook the following year, and earned a Doctor of Philosophy degree from the Pontifical Gregorian University in Rome in 1937.

McEleney served as rector of Shadowbrook from 1936 to 1942. In 1942, he became the first president of Fairfield University and the first rector of Fairfield College Preparatory School in Connecticut. He remained in those posts for two years, and afterwards served as provincial of the Jesuits' New England Province from 1944 to 1950.

On February 3, 1950, McEleney was appointed Vicar Apostolic of Jamaica and Titular Bishop of Zeugma by Pope Pius XII. He received his episcopal consecration on the following April 15 from Archbishop Richard Cushing, with Archbishop Henry O'Brien and Bishop Daniel Feeney serving as co-consecrators, at Holy Cross Cathedral in Boston. When the apostolic vicariate was elevated to the Diocese of Kingston on February 29, 1956, McEleney became its first bishop.

McEleney attended the Second Vatican Council between 1962 and 1965. He became an archbishop when the Diocese of Kingston was elevated to the rank of an archdiocese on September 14, 1967. During his twenty years in Jamaica, he encouraged the growth of a local church with a native clergy and nuns. He opened St. Michael's Seminary in 1952 to train native seminarians. He retired as archbishop on September 1, 1970; he was named Titular Archbishop of Lorium by Pope Paul VI on the same date, resigning on the following December 23.

McEleney spent his final three years at the Campion Center for Retired Jesuits in Weston. He died at Glover Memorial Hospital in Needham, at age 90.

| Preceded by 1st President | Fairfield University President; 1942–1944 | Succeeded by James H. Dolan, S.J. |
