= John T. Butler =

President of Boston College

The Reverend John T. Butler SJ

President of Boston College
- Incumbent
- Assumed office July 31, 2026
- Preceded by: William P. Leahy

Personal details
- Education: St. Thomas University (BA); Providence College (MA); Loyola University Maryland (MA PhD)

John T. "Jack" Butler is an American Jesuit priest who has been the president of Boston College since 2026.

== Early life and education ==
Butler grew up in Atlanta, Georgia, and attended Marist School. As a teenager, he played football and wanted to play college football. After an injury, he did not pursue college football. His family moved to Miami, Florida. He eventually enrolled at Biscayne College (now St. Thomas University) on probationary status. He earned a degree in religious studies in 1987. He then earned a master's degree in theology from Providence College. In 1995, he earned a master's degree and a Ph.D. in pastoral counseling from Loyola University Maryland. During his studies at Loyola, he realized that he has dyslexia, which he sees as a gift. In 2016, he gave the commencement speech at St. Thomas and received an honorary degree.

== Religious life ==
He entered the Society of Jesus in 1991. He was ordained a priest in 2000. Butler worked in prison ministry with people who had committed crimes of violence at St. Joseph Prison Ministry in Framingham, Massachusetts, and had also worked as director of vocations for the former New England Province of Jesuits. He said he was proud when Pope Francis, the first Jesuit pope, was elected in 2013.

=== Boston College ===
Butler started work at BC as a campus minister in 2002. He was appointed the director of the Manresa House which provides support to students interested in religious life. In 2010, he was named Vice President for University Mission and Ministry. He started working as the team chaplain for Boston College Eagles football in 2010. He has been involved in diversity initiatives and conversations at BC. He was the commencement speaker for the graduation at Boston College High School in 2025. In February 2025, Butler was appointed as the president of Boston College. He began serving in the role in July 2026 and was inaugurated on October 16th, 2026.
