= Fulton Hall =

Coordinates: 42°20′04″N 71°10′12″W

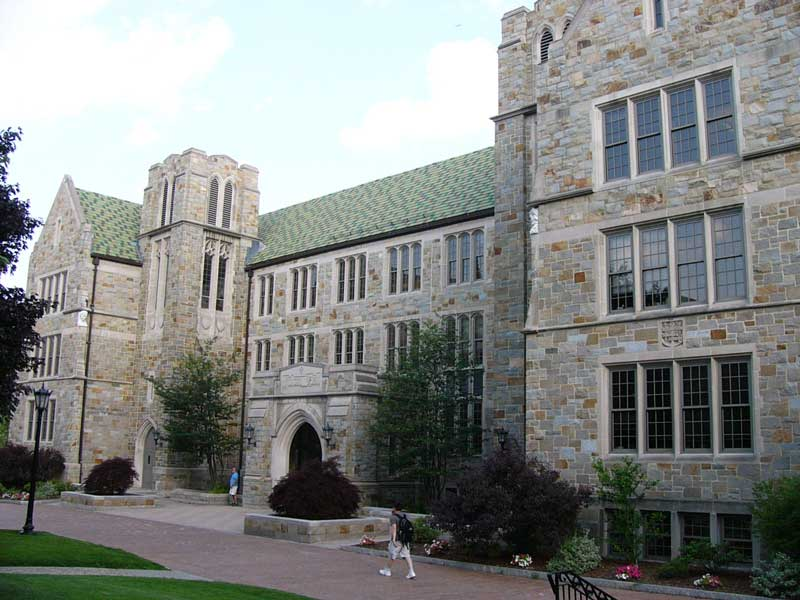
Fulton Hall

Fulton Hall is a building on the campus of Boston College that houses the Carroll School of Management. It is named for university president Robert J. Fulton.

== History ==
When World War II ended in 1945 there was a dramatic increase in enrollment at Boston College, due to the returning soldiers and the opportunities afforded to them by the G.I. Bill. The number of undergraduates swelled from 1,000 before the war to 5,000 by 1946. The available facilities could no longer accommodate any more students, so Boston College decided to build Fulton Hall. This building was, by far, the most sparse due to budget constraints. Students went door to door throughout the city of Boston selling “Bricks for Boston College” for $1 each in an attempt to raise funds. Working with whatever resources they could, Maginnis & Walsh designed a building that would never be able to live up to the rest of the existing buildings. The construction of Fulton Hall began in June 1947 and ended in 1948. The building was laid out on the south side of what is now known as the main quad. This area is composed of a large grassy courtyard surrounded by the Lyons, Gasson, Devlin, and Fulton buildings, one in each cardinal direction. The original design consisted of a simple 2-story Gothic-style building with a plain masonry façade, two towers in the front corners and a recessed courtyard on the south side. Because of its hilly location, and a request from the Trustees of Boston College that the building not block the view of Gasson Hall, only the top two stories were visible from the front of the building and the Gasson quadrangle, making it look small amongst the taller adjacent buildings.

== Architectural description and renovation ==
In the summer of 1993, Svigals & Associates radically renovated the exterior with the same polychrome masonry work as the rest of the building, but its interior is drastically different.

and reduces the industrial feel of the exposed structural members. The contrast of a warm and soft material like wood and a cold and stiff one like metal creates a very interesting effect, where the softer warmer material gives the building a finished, refined and elegant look while the steel makes it feel modern, strong and minimalist.

The large glass ceiling of the atrium allows large amounts of light to flow into the building throughout the day because of its east to west layout. This light is softened by the use of diffusing finishes on all of the interior surfaces, creating a naturally lit environment where it is nearly impossible to identify the source of light. All exposed wood has an eggshell finish that diffuses the light, as the masonry walls of the original building naturally do. To use the atrium's natural light and provide a sense of openness, the third, fourth, and fifth-floor north-facing walls (that face the atrium) on the rear section feature large windows. The second floor has a U-shaped balcony area that overlooks the open area in first floor, which is furnished with couches benches and tables and meant to be a meeting place and lounge area for students. The balcony, which connects the old building to the new one, features steel and wood handrails composed of steel vertical elements and wood horizontal elements that provide a softer and warmer material for human interaction. The handrails also feature gothic arches that span from column to column, and represent the union of the classic gothic building and the new, modern addition.

Because of lack of funds when it was constructed, the original Fulton Hall was a short, plain stone building. Many felt it looked out of place amongst the other much more ostentatious and taller colored-stone buildings. For many years, many regarded it as the most unsuccessful of the Maginnis & Walsh buildings. It went through many minor renovations, including construction of a small Library on the south side of the building overlooking the courtyard. This small library now overlooks the atrium. This wall features seven evenly spaced windows in the form of large Gothic arches, each of which is divided into three columns, each featuring a drop-shaped subdivision near the top for decoration. A lead rectangular grid pattern applied to large panels of glass creates the effect of the window being composed of small panes. This is a sharp contrast from the windows in the new addition, which are rectangular and feature large uninterrupted glass panes.
