= Joseph-Epiphane Darras =

French historian

Joseph-Epiphane Darras (6 September 1825 in Troyes, France – 8 November 1878 in Paris, France) was a Catholic ecclesiastical historian.

== Biography ==
Darras completed his classical training and his theological studies in the Petit Seminaire and the Grand Seminaire of Troyes. After his ordination to the priesthood, he became a teacher at the same Petit Seminaire. He published a panegyric on the Bishop of Troyes, Étienne Antoine Boulogne (1809–1825), disgraced by Napoleon I, for his firm attitude on the occasion of the assembly of the French bishops in 1811. As a result, he was forced to resign from his teaching position.

Darras then became tutor of Prince Eugene de Bauffremont, devoted himself to historical studies, and after the education of his pupil continued to live with the Bauffremont family.

Darras was a zealous antagonist of Gallicanism and devoted to the honour and the rights of the Holy See. He was at Rome during the Vatican Council as secretary to the meetings of the French bishops.

== Works ==
His first literary work was a translation of Francesco Sforza Pallavicino's Storia del Concilio Tridentino for the Migne collection. To the same period belongs the Légende de Notre-Dame (Paris, 1848), written under the influence of Montalembert.

His early theological studies did not include a good foundation in ecclesiastical history; this defect he sought to make good by private studies.

His Histoire générale de l'Eglise in four volumes, following the reigns of the popes, appeared in Paris in 1854 (14th ed., 1890). In the following years Darras published a Histoire de St. Dénis l'Aréopagite, premier évêque de Paris (Paris, 1863); a Histoire de Notre Seigneur Jésus-Christ (Paris, 1864), two volumes, and a Notice biographique de Mgr. Jager (Paris, 1868). He collaborated with Collin in the twenty-five volume Grande Vie des Saints (Paris, 1873–75).

In the meantime he had prepared the material for his chief work: Histoire de l'Eglise depuis la création, the first twenty-five volumes of which appeared before his death (Paris, 1875–77). They took the narrative up to the twelfth century. After his death, J. Bareille continued the work to the pontificate of Clement VII (volumes XXVI-XXXII, Paris, 1879–84). It was completed by J. Fevre to the pontificate of Leo XIII, inclusive (volumes XXXIII-XLIV, Paris, 1884–1907, with two volumes of Index). For a sharp criticism of it by the Bollandist Charles de Smedt, S.J., see the latter's "Principes de la critique historique" (Liège, 1885), 137 sqq., 285.
