= Jeremiah O'Connor (priest) =

American Jesuit educator (1841–1891)

The Reverend Jeremiah O'Connor SJ
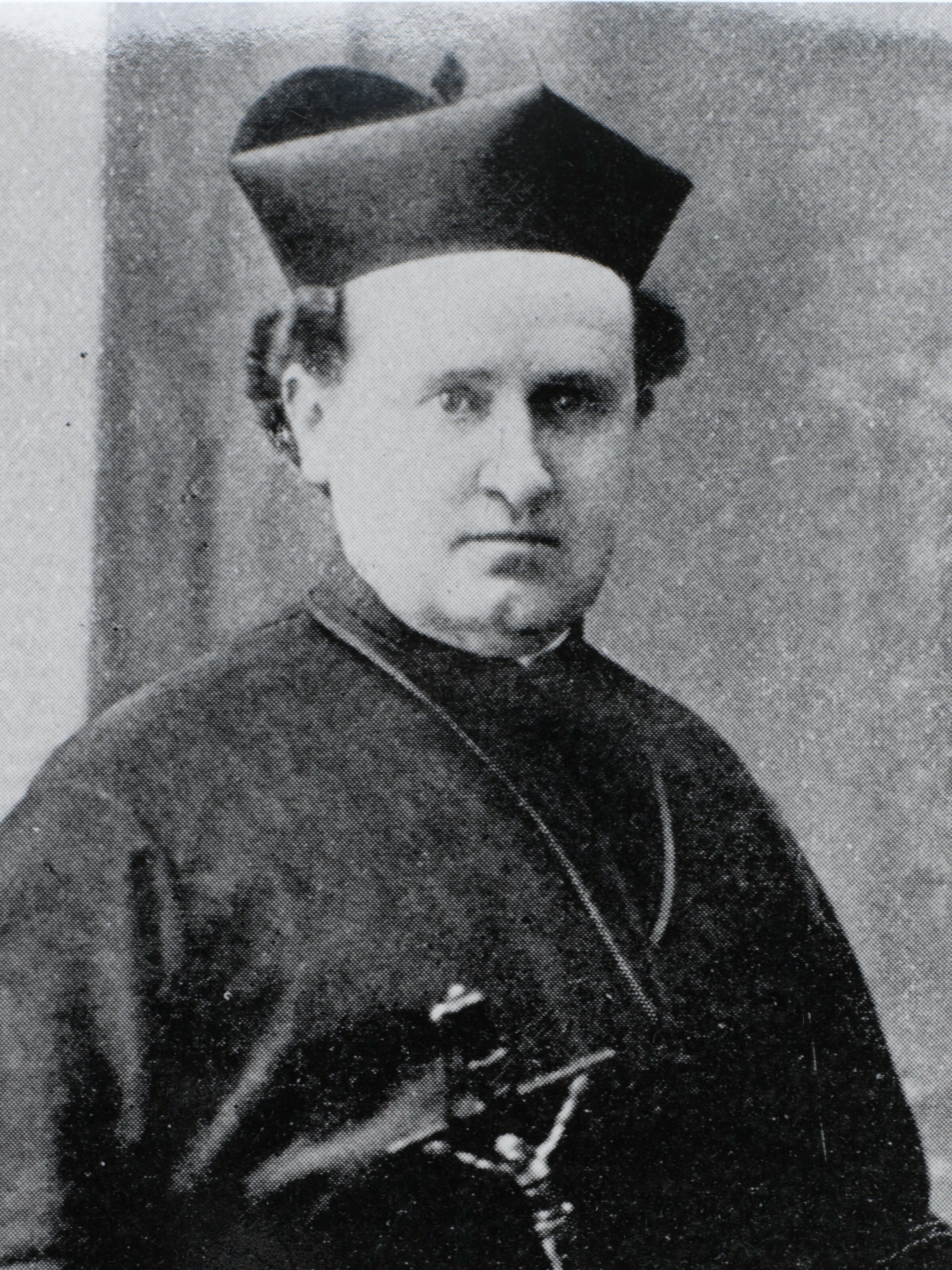
- O'Connor, c. 1880

4th President of Boston College
- In office 1880–1884
- Preceded by: Robert J. Fulton
- Succeeded by: Edward V. Boursaud

Personal details
- Born: April 10, 1841 Dublin, Ireland
- Died: February 27, 1891 (aged 49) New York City, U.S.
- Education: Saint Joseph's College

Orders
- Ordination: 1874

Jeremiah O'Connor SJ (April 10, 1841 – February 27, 1891) was an American Catholic priest and Jesuit who served as the president of Boston College from 1880 to 1884. Born in Dublin, he emigrated to the United States as a boy and eventually studied at Saint Joseph's College. He entered the Society of Jesus in 1860. In his later years, he served in parochial roles in New York City.

== Early life ==
Jeremiah O'Connor was born on April 10, 1841, in Dublin in the United Kingdom of Great Britain and Ireland. His father died approximately one month before his birth. He emigrated with his mother to the United States as a boy, settling in Philadelphia, Pennsylvania. He attended a public high school and then enrolled at Saint Joseph's College.

On July 30, 1860, O'Connor entered the Society of Jesus, and proceeded to the Jesuit novitiate in Frederick, Maryland. He began his regency at Loyola University in Maryland in 1863, and transferred to Woodstock College upon the opening of the school in September 1869. In 1874, O'Connor was ordained a priest.

== Boston College ==
In 1876, after completing his studies and tertianship, O'Connor went to Boston College, where he taught rhetoric. In 1878, he also became an assistant parish priest at the Church of the Immaculate Conception in the South End of Boston. He became known as a skilled preacher.

The provincial superior unexpectedly appointed O'Connor to replace Robert J. Fulton as the president of Boston College on January 11, 1880. During his presidency, O'Connor was also the pastor of the Church of the Immaculate Conception. O'Connor professed his fourth vow on August 15, 1880. During his presidency, the school magazine, The Stylus, was published for the first time in 1883. That year, the school's athletic association was created, which organized the first sports teams. Baseball was the first team fielded, followed by a track team. On July 31, 1884, O'Connor was succeeded as president by Edward V. Boursaud.

== Later years ==
In 1884, O'Connor became an operarius at St. Francis Xavier Church in Manhattan, New York City. (Note: An operarius is a Jesuit who works as a priest away from his Jesuit community.)

On September 3, 1888, O'Connor succeeded David Merrick as the pastor of the Church of St. Lawrence O'Toole (later known as the Church of St. Ignatius Loyola). He was generally known as a thrifty administrator except concerning the decoration of the altar for holidays. O'Connor died there at 4:40 a.m. on February 27, 1891. (Note: He was mistakenly believed by some to have died of pneumonia, contracted after assisting in the rescue of passengers from a deadly train collision in a tunnel in February 1891. However, he did not visit the site and was already very ill by then.) He was succeeded by Francis McCarthy.

Academic offices
Preceded by Robert J. Fulton	4th President of Boston College; 1880–1884	Succeeded by Edward V. Boursaud
Catholic Church titles
Preceded by Robert J. Fulton	5th Pastor of the Church of the Immaculate Conception; 1880–1884	Succeeded by Edward V. Boursaud
Preceded by David Merrick	13th Pastor of the Church of St. Lawrence O'Toole; 1888–1891	Succeeded by Francis McCarthy
