= William P. Leahy =

President of Boston College

The Reverend William Leahy SJ
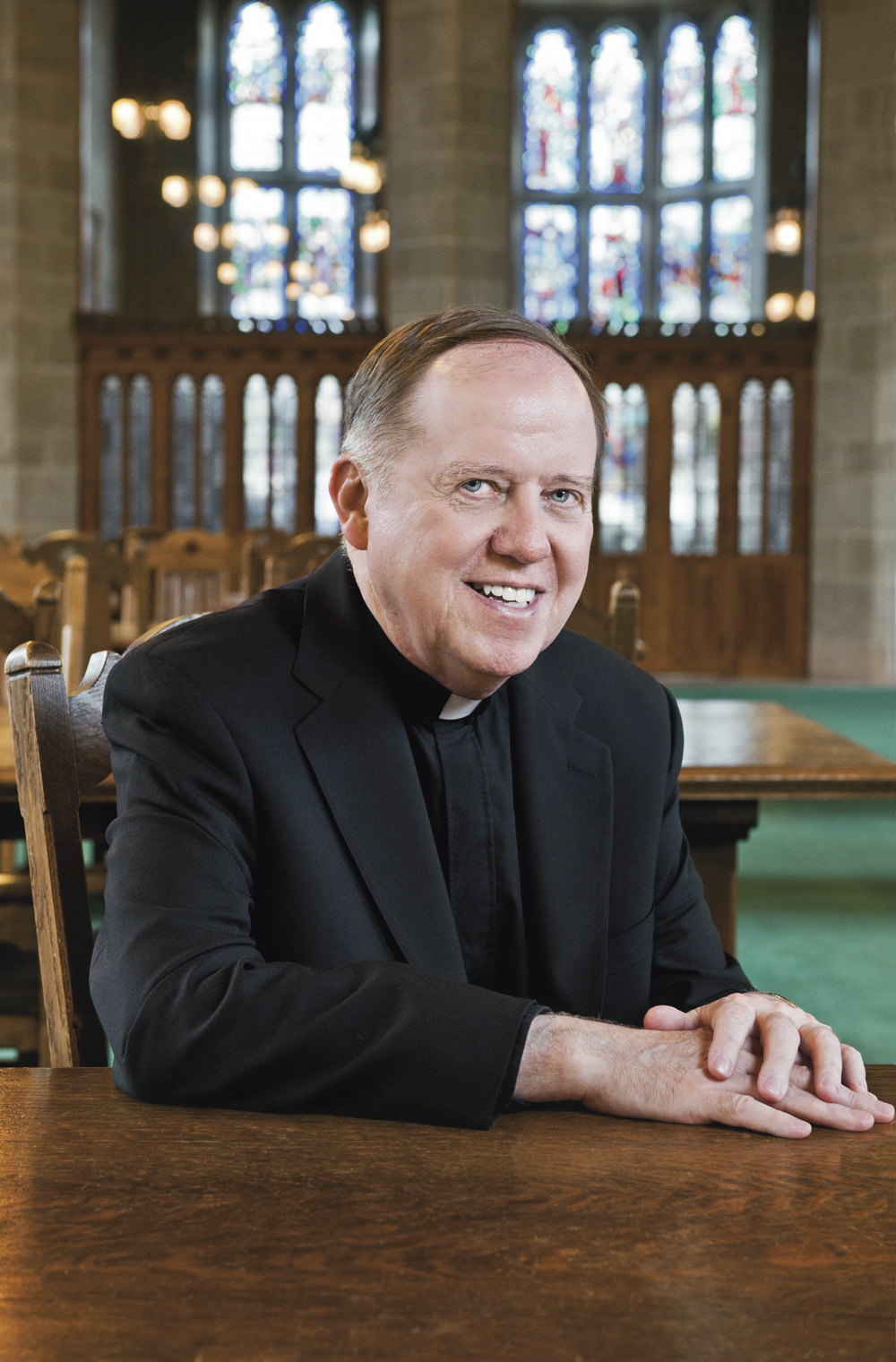

25th President of Boston College
- In office July 31, 1996 – July 31, 2026
- Preceded by: J. Donald Monan
- Succeeded by: John T. Butler

Personal details
- Born: July 16, 1948 (age 78) Omaha, Nebraska, U.S.
- Education: Saint Louis University (BA, MA); Jesuit School of Theology (MDiv, MTS); Stanford University (PhD)

William Patrick Leahy SJ (born 1948) is an American Jesuit academic who was the 25th president of Boston College from 1996 to 2026. He was the longest serving president in the school's history.

== Career ==
He joined the Society of Jesus in 1967, and is a member of the Jesuits' Midwest Province. Leahy earned a bachelor's degree in philosophy and a master's degree in United States history at Saint Louis University in 1972 and 1975, respectively. He then began studies at the Jesuit School of Theology at Berkeley in Berkeley, California, where he earned degrees in theology (1978) and historical theology (1980). He was ordained a priest in 1978. He received a doctoral degree in U.S. history from Stanford University in 1986.

Leahy was a teacher at Campion High School in Wisconsin from 1973 to 1975. He served as a teaching assistant at Stanford in 1981 before joining the Marquette University faculty as an instructor of history in 1985. He became an associate professor with tenure in 1991, and in that same year became Marquette's executive vice president.

Leahy's memberships include the American Catholic Historical Association, the American Historical Association, the History of Education Society, and the Organization of American Historians.

== Boston College presidency ==
In 2006, after a two-year self-study involving more than 200 BC faculty, administrators, students and alumni, Leahy announced a $1.6-billion strategic plan that called for hiring 100 new faculty, adding a dozen new academic centers and spending $1 billion in construction and renovation projects. The Plan set seven strategic directions for the University: To become a national leader in liberal arts education and student formation; to enhance its research initiatives in select natural sciences and in areas that address urgent social problems; to support leadership initiatives in BC's graduate and professional schools; to expand international programs and partnerships. Leahy's stated goal was to establish Boston College as "the world's leading Catholic university."

In line with this direction, the Weston Jesuit School of Theology re-affiliated with Boston College in 2008 to form the new School of Theology and Ministry. During the same year, Leahy started the construction of Stokes Hall, a 183,000-square-foot (17,000 m^{2}) administrative and classroom building for BC's humanities departments, which opened in 2012. In 2002, Leahy initiated the Church in the 21st Century program to examine issues facing the Roman Catholic Church in light of the clergy sexual abuse scandal.

=== Controversies ===
Free speech and academic freedom

In April 2009, the Foundation for Individual Rights and Expression (FIRE) sent a letter to Leahy criticizing Boston College's restrictions on free expression, despite its stated commitments to academic freedom in the "Statement of Rights and Responsibilities." Incidents cited included: attempts in 2003 to impose administrative control over the student newspaper ''The Heights'' after a controversial advertisement; the 2006 confiscation of 3,000 copies of ''The Heights''' orientation issue due to an opinion column; disciplinary actions in 2008 against students for posting satirical flyers deemed disrespectful; and the 2009 ban on former Weather Underground member Bill Ayers speaking on campus amid community pressure.

Mishandling of student sexual assault accusation

In 2019, a federal jury ruled that Boston College breached its contract with former student John Doe, who was accused of sexual assault in a 2012 incident on a cruise ship during a university event. The university found Doe responsible following an internal hearing and suspended him, despite criminal charges being dropped in 2014 due to lack of evidence. Doe sued BC, alleging procedural violations, and the jury awarded him $112,400 in damages for lost tuition and income, citing failures in private panel deliberations and influencing a witness. The case highlighted criticisms of BC's disciplinary processes in sexual assault matters, with observers noting disregard for evidence and fairness concerns amid broader Title IX debates.

Handling of misconduct allegations

In 2021, Leahy faced calls for his resignation over his response to 1997–1998 complaints about Rev. Ted Dziak, S.J., a Jesuit priest at Boston College from 1990 to 1998, involving alleged emotional abuse and inappropriate behavior with young male students. Leahy stated he discussed concerns with Dziak, and reported them to Jesuit superiors, but took no formal disciplinary action; Dziak left BC in 1998. Later allegations emerged that Dziak raped a postgraduate volunteer in Belize in 2004, leading to his 2020 removal from Le Moyne College pending investigation. A petition with over 400 signatures accused Leahy of failing to intervene decisively, enabling further harm and lacking accountability. Critics, including students and alumni, argued his leadership contradicted Jesuit values of justice, dignity, citing broader patterns such as silence on racial incidents since 1996.

Retirement funds mismanagement lawsuit

In 2024, Boston College settled a class-action lawsuit alleging mismanagement of employee 401(k) retirement plans, including excessive fees and violations of fiduciary duties under the Employee Retirement Income Security Act (ERISA). The suit, filed in 2022 by former employees, was settled for $330,000, with funds allocated for attorney fees, administrative costs, and distributions to eligible participants. The settlement also mandated hiring a consultant for five years to advise on fund expenses and performance.

Price-fixing lawsuit

In October 2024, Boston College was named in a class-action lawsuit, accusing them of price-fixing by requiring financial information from noncustodial parents in aid determinations via the CSS Profile, allegedly inflating tuition costs. The suit claims this practice, ongoing since 2006, disadvantaged students from single-parent families and violated antitrust laws.

In June 2024, Leahy announced his intention to step down as president.

== Published works ==
=== Books ===
- Adapting to America: Catholics, Jesuits and Higher Education in the Twentieth Century (Georgetown University Press, 1991)

=== Articles ===
Leahy has written a number of articles on Catholic higher education in the United States, including, among others:

- "The Rise of Laity in American Catholic Higher Education," Records of the American Catholic Historical Society (1991)
- "Academic Professionalism and American Catholic Higher Education," Assembly 1989: Jesuit Ministry in Higher Education (1990)

In addition, Leahy has authored numerous articles in the Dictionary of Christianity in America and book reviews in History, The Journal of American History, and History of Education Quarterly.
