= Juniorate =

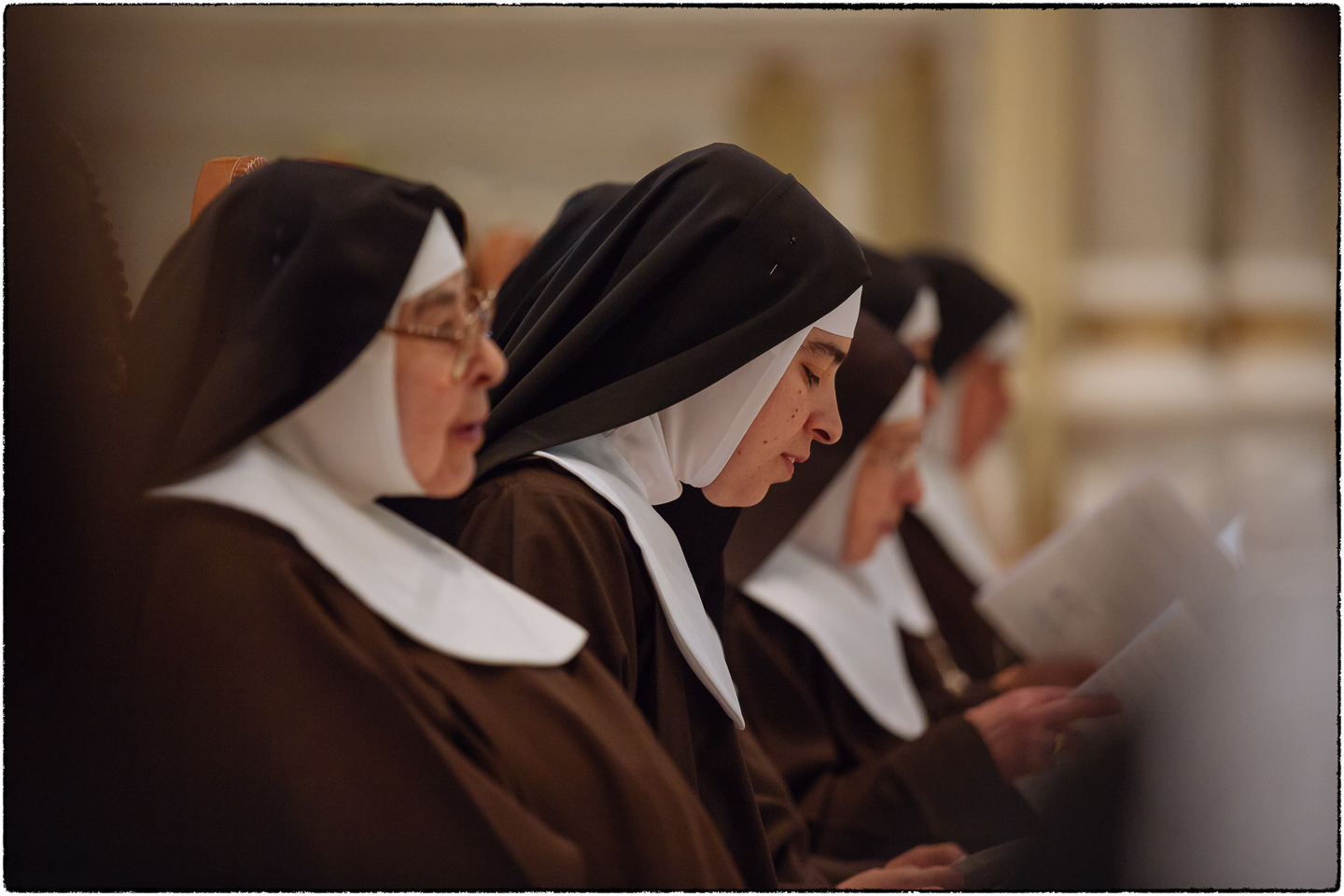
Juniorate

Juniorate is a three-year course of philosophy in high school for candidates that are planning to postulate to become a priest or nun. During this time, they will get deeper involved and will decide whether this is the road they are interested in following.

== To become a Priest ==
- Must be Roman Catholic follower.
- Must be at least 25 years old.
- Require to be baptized.
- Confirmation is necessary.
- Must be unmarried.
- Must not have gone through a divorce or must annul marriage if separated.
- Two years must pass after becoming a widower to allow time for mourning before making priestly promises. (Medina)

=== Stages of Formation ===
- Postulancy
- Seminary
- Novitiate
- Juniorate
- Religious vows
- Ongoing Formation

(Medina)

== Seminary ==
Seminary is where priests and nuns are educated or shaped into effective ministers of God to be able to guide a church. It is a higher theological study and is required.

When applying to the seminary, an individual must obtain recommendations from church members in order to strengthen their resume and personal expertise in various monasteries. The seminar takes three to four years to complete, depending on the classes taken while obtaining a bachelor's degree. Applied Ministry, Biblical and Educational Studies, Christian Leadership and Management, Cultural Engagement, and Religion are some of the degree programs available. These are only a few professional alternatives, but they are not required; there are many others. When it comes to pursuing the seminary, the requirements recommend studying some form of theology or philosophy classes

== To become a Nun ==
- Must be Roman Catholic follower
- Must not have any dependent children.
- Do not have any debts.
- Must be single.
- Must be 18 to 40-ish years old.
- Must be physically and psychologically healthy.
- A college degree is not required; nevertheless, many religious groups recommend that the applicant must have at least a bachelor's degree before applying.

(Servants of the Lord and the Virgin of Matara)

=== Stages of Formation ===
- Postulancy
- Novitiate
- Juniorate
- Religious vows
- Perpetual Profession
- Ongoing Formation

(Servants of the Lord and the Virgin of Matara)

== Catholic Formation ==
Is the process in which the catholic church prepared an individual entering the priesthood or sisterhood. The main four areas that they must seek to shape after their seminary formation is:

- Human
- Spiritual
- Intellectual
- Pastoral

== External references ==
- Sisters of the Presentation of Mary
- "How To become a Catholic Nun"
- Our Lady of Dallas Monastery
- Diocese of Kansas City- ST. Joseph
- Brown habit black veil white Wimpole Picture
