= Will Hobson =

American journalist

- Born: June 22, 1984 (age 42); Philadelphia, Pennsylvania, U.S.
- Education: Boston College
- Occupation: Journalist
- Years active: 2006 – present

Will Hobson is an American journalist and the recipient of the 2014 Pulitzer Prize for Local Reporting.

== Early life and career ==
Hobson was born in Miami, Florida in 1984 and grew up outside Philadelphia, Pennsylvania. He attended Boston College where he wrote op-eds for the student newspaper The Heights. He graduated in 2006 with a bachelor's degree in English. Hobson interned at Philadelphia magazine in 2006. He has worked as an investigative reporter for the Tampa Bay Times, the News Herald and The Daytona Beach News-Journal.

In 2014, he was awarded a Pulitzer Prize in Local Reporting for his exposé on Tampa's homeless housing program. The prize was for "a distinguished example of reporting on significant issues of local concern, demonstrating originality and community expertise, using any available journalistic tool." The series resulted in the resignation or firing of at least four government officials.

Since January 2015, Hobson has worked as a sports reporter for The Washington Post . The Washington Post describes him as a "national sports reporter with a focus on accountability and investigations." In 2025, Hobson's series “The Concussion Files” won a Sports Investigations award from the Investigative Reporters and Editors.

== Awards ==
- 2014 Pulitzer Prize for Local Reporting (with Mike LaForgia)
