= Georgetown University College of Arts & Sciences =

Largest undergraduate school of Georgetown University

- Seal of Georgetown University
- Former names: Georgetown College (1789– ,1990–2022)
- Type: Private college
- Established: 1789; 237 years ago
- Parent institution: Georgetown University
- Affiliations: Roman Catholic (Jesuit)
- Dean: David M. Edelstein
- Students: 3,566 (2021)
- Location: Washington, D.C., United States; 38°54′32.1″N 77°4′20.2″W
- Campus: Urban
- Website: college.georgetown.edu

The Georgetown University College of Arts & Sciences (CAS) is a college of Georgetown University, a private Jesuit research university in the Georgetown neighborhood of Washington, D.C.. It is the oldest and largest undergraduate school at Georgetown, and, until the founding of the School of Medicine in 1850, was the only higher education division of the university. In 1821, it granted its first graduate degrees, though the graduate portion has since been separated as the Georgetown University Graduate School of Arts & Sciences. From 1990 to 2022, it was named Georgetown College.

The college enrolls over 3,500 students in 30 academic majors within 23 departments.

== History ==
From 1789 until the founding of the School of Medicine in 1850, Georgetown College was the only secondary school at what became Georgetown University. Robert Plunkett, the first president of Georgetown, oversaw the division of the school into three parts, "college", "preparatory", and "elementary". Elementary education was eventually dropped by Patrick Francis Healy, and preparatory eventually separated as Georgetown Prep.

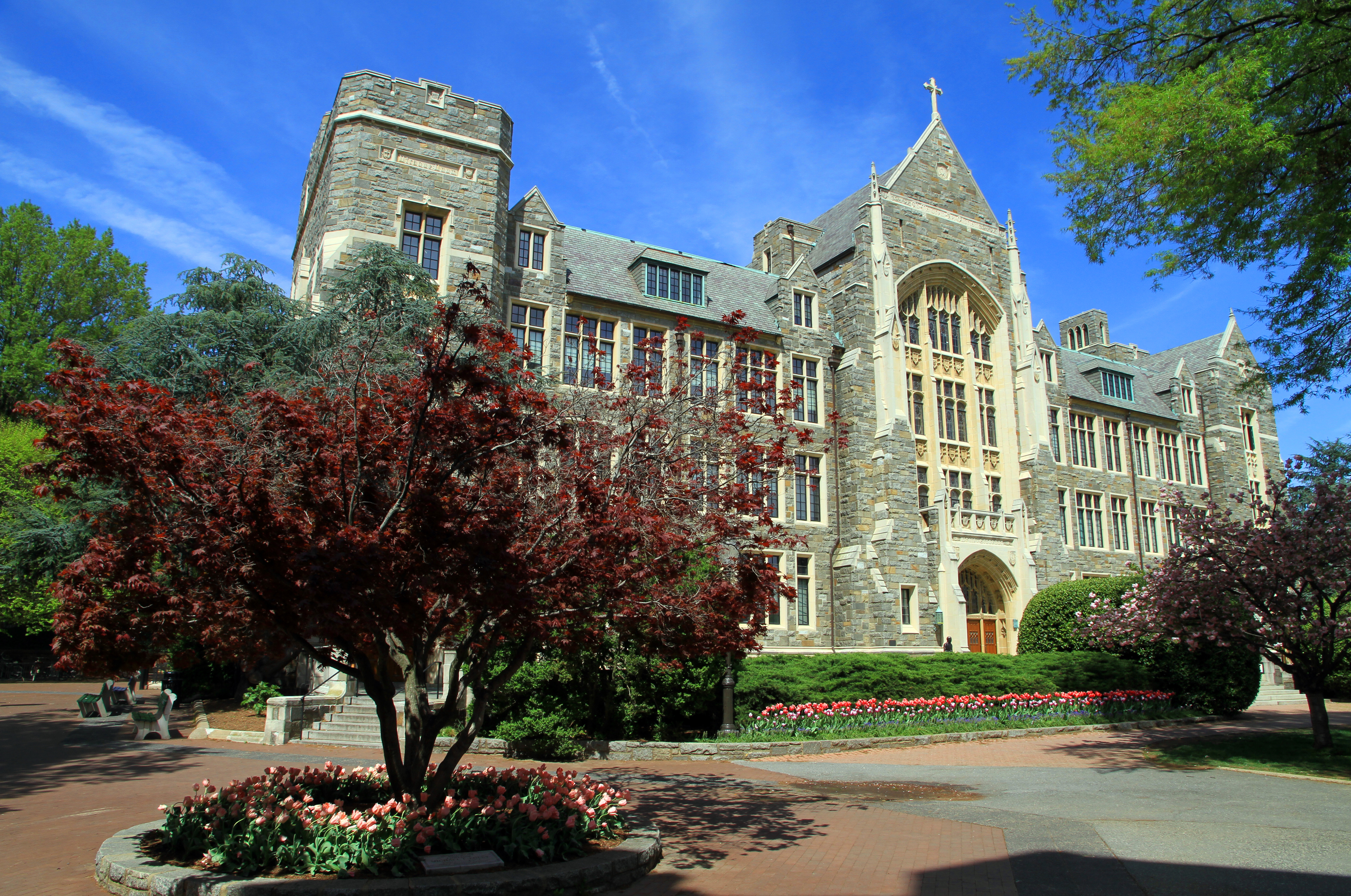
The White-Gravenor Hall houses most of the college's staff and faculty offices, including the Office of the Dean

Over the years many schools have broken off of the College. The Graduate School of Arts and Sciences first broke off in 1855, but rejoined the college organization following the downturn in admissions caused by the American Civil War, until reestablishment in 1891. The School of Languages and Linguistics, itself organized out of the School of Foreign Service in 1949, was collapsed into the College in 1995, as the Faculty of Languages and Linguistics, though it maintains its separate programs.

== Degrees ==
The college offers Bachelor of Arts and Bachelor of Science degree programs.

== List of deans and prefects of studies ==
From 1811 to 1931, Georgetown College was led by a prefect of studies. Since 1931, it has been led by a dean. Andrew Sobanet has been the interim dean of the school since July 1, 2024. The following people have led the college:

Deans and prefects of studies
No.	Name	Years	Ref.
Prefects of Studies
1	Giovanni Antonio Grassi SJ	1811–1817	
2	Roger Baxter SJ	1819–1824	
3	William Feiner SJ	1825–1826	
4	James Neill SJ	1826–1827	
5	Peter Walsh SJ	1827–1828	
6	Thomas F. Mulledy SJ	1829–1831	
7	William Grace SJ	1831–1833	
8	Thomas F. Mulledy SJ	1833–1837	
9	William McSherry SJ	1837–1839	
10	George Fenwick SJ	1840–1841	
11	James A. Ryder SJ	1841–1843	
12	George Fenwick SJ	1843–1845	
13	Thomas F. Mulledy SJ	1845–1848	
14	James A. Ryder SJ	1848–1851	
15	Charles H. Stonestreet SJ	1851–1852	
16	Bernard A. Maguire SJ	1852–1853	
17	Francis Knackstedt SJ	1853–1854	
18	Bernard A. Maguire SJ	1854–1858	
19	John Early SJ	1858–1865	
20	Bernard A. Maguire SJ	1866–1867	
21	Joseph O'Callaghan SJ	1867–1868	
22	Patrick F. Healy SJ	1868–1880	
23	William Whiteford SJ	1880–1881	
24	James A. Doonan SJ	1881–1882	
25	James B. Becker SJ	1882–1883	
26	Edward I. Devitt SJ	1883–1886	
27	James A. Doonan SJ	1886–1888	
28	J. Havens Richards SJ	1888–1898	
29	James P. Fagan SJ	1898–1901	
30	John A. Conway SJ	1901–1903	
31	W. G. Read Mullan SJ	1903–1905	
32	Charles Macksey SJ	1905–1909	
33	John B. Creeden SJ	1909–1918	
34	Edmund A. Walsh SJ	1918	
35	W. Coleman Nevils SJ	1918–1922	
36	William T. Tallon SJ	1922–1924	
37	Louis J. Gallagher SJ	1924–1926	
38	Robert A. Parsons SJ	1926–1928	
39	R. Rush Rankin SJ	1928–1931	
Deans
1	John J. McLaughlin SJ	1931–1932	
2	Vincent J. Hart SJ	1932–1933	
3	George F. Strohaver SJ	1933–1934	
4	John E. Grattan SJ	1934–1942	
5	Stephen F. McNamee SJ	1942–1946	
6	Charles L. Coolahan SJ	1946–1949	
7	Edward G. Jacklin SJ	1949–1951	
8	Brian A. McGrath SJ	1951–1957	
9	Joseph A. Sellinger SJ	1957–1964	
10	Thomas R. Fitzgerald SJ	1964–1966	
11	Royden B. Davis SJ	1966–1989	
12	Robert B. Lawton SJ	1989–1999	
13	Jane Dammen McAuliffe	1999–2008	
14	Chester Gillis	2008–2017	
15	Christopher Celenza	2017–2020	
16	Rosario Ceballo	2022–2024	
17	David M. Edelstein	2025–present	
