= John F. Quirk =

American Jesuit educator (1859–1922)

The Reverend John F. Quirk SJ
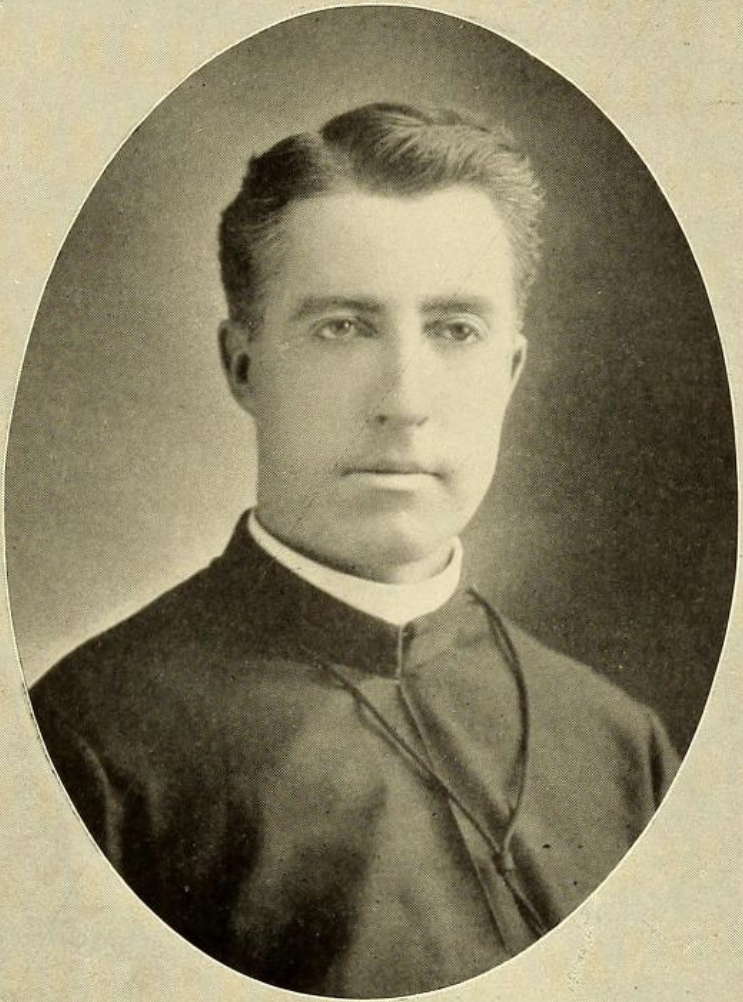

12th President of Loyola College in Maryland
- In office 1901–1907
- Preceded by: William P. Brett
- Succeeded by: W. G. Read Mullan

Personal details
- Born: July 23, 1859; Boston, Massachusetts, U.S.
- Died: November 19, 1922 (aged 63); Hyde Park, New York, U.S.
- Resting place: St. Andrew-on-Hudson Cemetery
- Education: Woodstock College

Orders
- Ordination: August 30, 1891 by James Gibbons

John F. Quirk SJ (July 23, 1859 – November 19, 1922) was an American Catholic priest and Jesuit who was the president of Loyola College in Maryland from 1901 to 1907. Born in Boston, he studied at Boston College before entering the Society of Jesus in 1876.

Quirk taught philosophy at St. John's College (later Fordham University) in New York, Boston College, and Gonzaga College in Washington, D.C. As president of Loyola College, he presided over the school's fiftieth anniversary celebrations. Afterwards, he returned to teaching at St. John's College, Georgetown University, the College of the Holy Cross, and Boston College.

== Early life ==
John F. Quirk was born on July 23, 1859, in the Roxbury neighborhood of Boston, Massachusetts. The son of John and Julia Quirk, he was one of four boys and one girl. Two of his brothers, William J. and Edward A., also became priests. Another brother, Charles I. Quirk, became a member of the Massachusetts General Court.

Quirk was first educated at Dearborn Grammar School. At an early age, he enrolled at the preparatory department of Boston College. On August 5, 1876, he entered the Society of Jesus, proceeding to the novitiate in Frederick, Maryland. Quirk studied philosophy at the novitiate, then spent his five years of regency at St. John's College, later known as Fordham University, from 1883 to 1888. He subsequently returned to Maryland to study theology at Woodstock College. Quirk was ordained a priest at Woodstock by Cardinal James Gibbons, the Archbishop of Baltimore, on August 30, 1891.

== Academic career ==
After his ordination, Quirk returned to St. John's College, where he taught rhetoric from 1893 to 1897. He also became the prefect of studies at St. John's. On February 2, 1895, Quirk professed his fourth vow in the Society of Jesus. After three years at St. John's, he moved to Boston College, where he was also prefect of studies for another three years. He was also vice president of Boston College from 1896 to 1900. Quirk then became a minister and professor of philosophy at Gonzaga College in Washington, D.C., for one year.

In 1898, Quirk was appointed the vice president of Loyola College in Maryland. On June 22, 1901, he succeeded William P. Brett as the president of Loyola. At the same time, Quirk became the pastor of St. Ignatius Church in Baltimore, succeeding Brett. At the start of his first academic year, enrollment declined because students were turned away after the school raised its academic standards. During his tenure, Quirk became a close friend of Cardinal Gibbons. Quirk presided over the college's fiftieth anniversary celebrations in 1902. In 1907, Quirk's tenure as president and pastor came to an end and he was succeeded by W. G. Read Mullan.

== Later years ==
After his presidency, Quirk became the vice president and prefect of studies at Fordham University for three years. From 1909 to 1910, he was a professor of the junior class at Saint Joseph's College in Philadelphia. In 1910, Quirk became the vice president of Georgetown University for one year and then was appointed a professor of logic, general metaphysics, and English literature. He taught there for seven years, where he was also minister for one year. He also taught philosophy at the College of the Holy Cross in Massachusetts. In 1914, he was appointed chair of moral philosophy and metaphysics at Boston College, a position held by Brett before Quirk.

Quirk was a member of the National Catholic Educational Association and the Maryland Historical Society. He lectured before the Maryland Historical Society, the American Catholic Historical Association, and Johns Hopkins University. He was also a juror in the educational exhibit at the 1904 Saint Louis Exposition. He was a contributor to the Messenger of the Sacred Heart and the Catholic Encyclopedia.

In his later years, Quirk served as a spiritual father in Yonkers, New York, for one year and was a confessor at the College of the Holy Cross for one year. Around 1921, Quirk suffered a stroke, and he retired to St. Andrew-on-Hudson in Hyde Park, New York. He died there on November 19, 1922. Quirk's funeral was held at St. Andrew-on-Hudson and he was buried in the St. Andrew-on-Hudson cemetery.

== Works ==
- A Patron for Scholars Eulogy on the Blessed Edmund Campion, S.J. New York: St. John's College Press. 1896. OCLC 13036609.
- "Father Ferdinand Farmer: An Apostolic Missionary in Three States". Woodstock Letters. 44 (1): 55–66. February 1915. Archived from the original on September 13, 2023 – via Jesuit Online Library.
- "Sarbiewski, Mathias Casimir". The Catholic Encyclopedia. Vol. 13. New York: The Encyclopedia Press. 1913. pp. 471–472. OCLC 1075116613 – via Internet Archive.

Academic offices
Preceded by William P. Brett	12th President of Loyola College in Maryland; 1901–1907	Succeeded by W. G. Read Mullan
Catholic Church titles
Preceded by William P. Brett	11th Pastor of St. Ignatius Church; 1901–1907	Succeeded by W. G. Read Mullan
