= William J. Ennis =

American Jesuit educator (1862–1925)

The Reverend William J. Ennis SJ
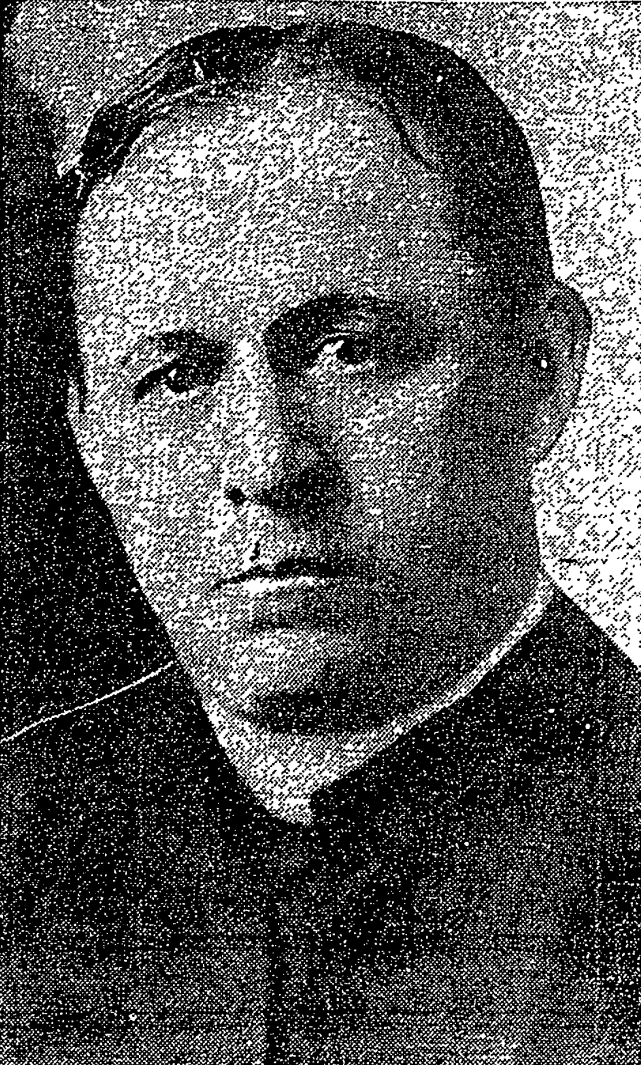
- Ennis c. 1911

15th President of Loyola College in Maryland
- In office 1911–1918
- Preceded by: Francis X. Brady
- Succeeded by: Joseph McEneany

Personal details
- Born: February 14, 1862 New York City, U.S.
- Died: June 10, 1925 (aged 63) New York City, U.S.
- Education: Woodstock College

Orders
- Ordination: June 25, 1894 by James Gibbons

William J. Ennis SJ (February 14, 1862 – June 10, 1925) was an American Catholic priest and Jesuit who was the president of Loyola College in Maryland from 1911 to 1918 and was the first vice principal of Loyola School in New York City. He entered the Society of Jesus in 1879 and during his Jesuit formation, studied at Woodstock College and taught at Georgetown University. In 1895, he became the prefect of studies at Georgetown.

In 1900, Ennis became the first vice principal of the newly established Loyola School, a position equivalent to principal, and oversaw instruction for three years. He subsequently taught at various Jesuit colleges before becoming president of Loyola College. In his later years, he remained at the Church of St. Ignatius Loyola in New York.

== Early life ==
Ennis was born on February 14, 1862, in the Greenwich Village neighborhood of Manhattan in New York City. He was baptized at the Church of St. Joseph. For four years during his youth, he worked as an office clerk for a relative, and at night, studied at St. Francis Xavier College, later known as Xavier High School.

On July 30, 1879, Ennis entered the Society of Jesus at the novitiate in West Park, New York, spending two years there. From 1881 to 1885, he studied at the novitiate in Frederick, Maryland. He then studied philosophy at Woodstock College in Maryland and afterwards taught at Georgetown University in Washington, D.C., for five years. From 1891 to 1894, he studied theology. On June 25, 1894, Ennis was ordained a priest by Cardinal James Gibbons, the Archbishop of Baltimore, at Woodstock College.

In 1895, Ennis became the prefect of studies at Loyola College in Maryland. However, after two weeks, he was transferred to Georgetown University as the vice president and prefect of studies because its incumbent, Francis Powers, was ill. He spent two years in this position. Ennis then went to Angers, France, for his tertianship, and then returned to Georgetown for one year as a professor of rhetoric. Ennis subsequently spent one year at St. Francis Xavier Church in Manhattan, where he also taught poetry at St. Francis Xavier College.

== Loyola School ==
In the late 19th century, wealthy Catholic families in New York desired the creation of a Catholic school for their sons that was of comparable academic quality to the exclusive, non-Catholic preparatory schools in the city and that could prepare them for acceptance into elite Ivy League universities. After many requests by such families and by the Archbishop of New York, Michael Corrigan, the Jesuit provincial superior decided to open such a school, next to the Church of St. Ignatius Loyola on the Upper East Side. N. N. McKinnon was named the president of the new Loyola School, and in 1900, Ennis was appointed vice principal of the school, a position that was the equivalent of principal. Construction on the school's building began in February 1899. By October 1, 1900, the building was not yet ready due to a strike, and the first classes were held in the church's rectory. Ennis oversaw the admission of the first class of eight students. On December 17, classes transferred to the completed school building, and six more students enrolled.

Ennis' office consisted only of a folding bed, which he used as his desk during the day. Ennis hired several others to assist at the school and oversaw the institution's first year, with 18 total students enrolled by the end of the year. He created student dramatic and debating associations. By the third academic year of 1902 to 1903, enrollment had increased to 40 and the school was prosperous enough that the provincial superior began assigning Jesuit scholastics to work there. By the start of the 1903 academic year, Ennis had established a full curriculum of high school classes. In 1903, he left the school and was succeeded by James P. Fagan as principal.

From 1904 to 1905, Ennis was a professor of poetry at Boston College. The following academic year, he was a professor of philosophy at Georgetown, and from 1905 to 1906, he was a junior professor of philosophy at Loyola College. In 1907, Ennis joined the Jesuit missionary band, engaging in pastoral work in New England and the Mid-Atlantic regions.

== Loyola College ==
On May 16, 1911, Ennis was named to succeed Francis X. Brady as the president of Loyola College in Maryland. At the same time, he became the pastor of St. Ignatius Church in Baltimore. Ennis' tenure as president of Loyola came to an end in August 1918 because of a newly promulgated canon law limiting members of religious orders to six years as the superior of one of their order's houses. He was succeeded by Joseph McEneany as president and pastor.

Ennis then returned to the Church of St. Ignatius Loyola Church in New York City, where he remained for the rest of his life. He died on June 10, 1925, at St. Elizabeth Hospital in the Inwood section of Manhattan.

== Works ==
- "Lenten Work in England: By a Tertian Father". Woodstock Letters. 27 (2): 229–236. June 1898. Archived from the original on August 14, 2023 – via Jesuit Online Library.
- "The Loyola School". Woodstock Letters. 30 (1): 108–114. May 1901. Archived from the original on August 14, 2023 – via Jesuit Online Library.
- "Carlisle Indian Students in Retreat". Woodstock Letters. 37 (3): 319–324. October 1908. Archived from the original on August 14, 2023 – via Jesuit Online Library.

Academic offices
New office	1st Vice Principal of Loyola School; 1900–1903	Succeeded by James P. Fagan
Preceded by Francis X. Brady	15th President of Loyola College in Maryland; 1911–1918	Succeeded by Joseph McEneany
Catholic Church titles
Preceded by Francis X. Brady	14th Pastor of St. Ignatius Church; 1911–1918	Succeeded by Joseph McEneany
