= Francis X. Brady =

American Jesuit educator

The Reverend Francis X. Brady

14th President of Loyola College in Maryland
- In office 1908–1911
- Preceded by: W. G. Read Mullan
- Succeeded by: William J. Ennis

Personal details
- Born: March 29, 1857 Gettysburg, Pennsylvania
- Died: March 13, 1911 (aged 53) Baltimore, Maryland
- Education: Woodstock College

Francis Xavier Brady (March 29, 1857 – March 13, 1911) was an American Catholic priest and Jesuit. Born near Gettysburg, Pennsylvania, he studied at Woodstock College, and held positions in various Jesuit institutions before becoming President of Loyola College in Maryland in 1908. He held the office until his death in 1911.

== Early life ==
Francis Xavier Brady was born on March 29, 1857, in Buchanan Valley near Gettysburg, Pennsylvania, to Samuel J. Brady and Margaret Goy. His father was of Irish descent, while his mother was Pennsylvania Dutch. One of five children, he had three brothers and a sister who entered the Sisters of St. Joseph. Francis decided to join the Society of Jesus, and entered the novitiate in Frederick, Maryland, on July 21, 1873. As part of his studies, he was sent to Woodstock College in 1876. After three years, he went to teach at Gonzaga College. He was then transferred to St. Peter's Church in Jersey City, New Jersey, in 1881, before returning to Woodstock in 1884 to complete his education.

Because of his poor health, the Jesuit superiors decided to expedite his studies, and he was ordained a priest by Cardinal James Gibbons on August 28, 1886, at Woodstock College.

== Pastoral and educational career ==
Brady became the vice president of Loyola College in Maryland in 1892, serving in this position for three years. In June 1908, Brady was named the President of Loyola College, succeeding W. G. Read Mullan. At the same time, he succeeded Mullan as the pastor of St. Ignatius Church in Baltimore. He held both positions until his death on March 13, 1911, in Baltimore. He was succeeded by Ennis as president and pastor.

Academic offices
Preceded by W. G. Read Mullan	14th President of Loyola College in Maryland; 1908–1911	Succeeded by William J. Ennis
Catholic Church titles
Preceded by W. G. Read Mullan	13th Pastor of St. Ignatius Church; 1895–1908	Succeeded by William J. Ennis
