= William Francis Clarke =

19th-century American Jesuit educator

The Reverend William Francis Clarke
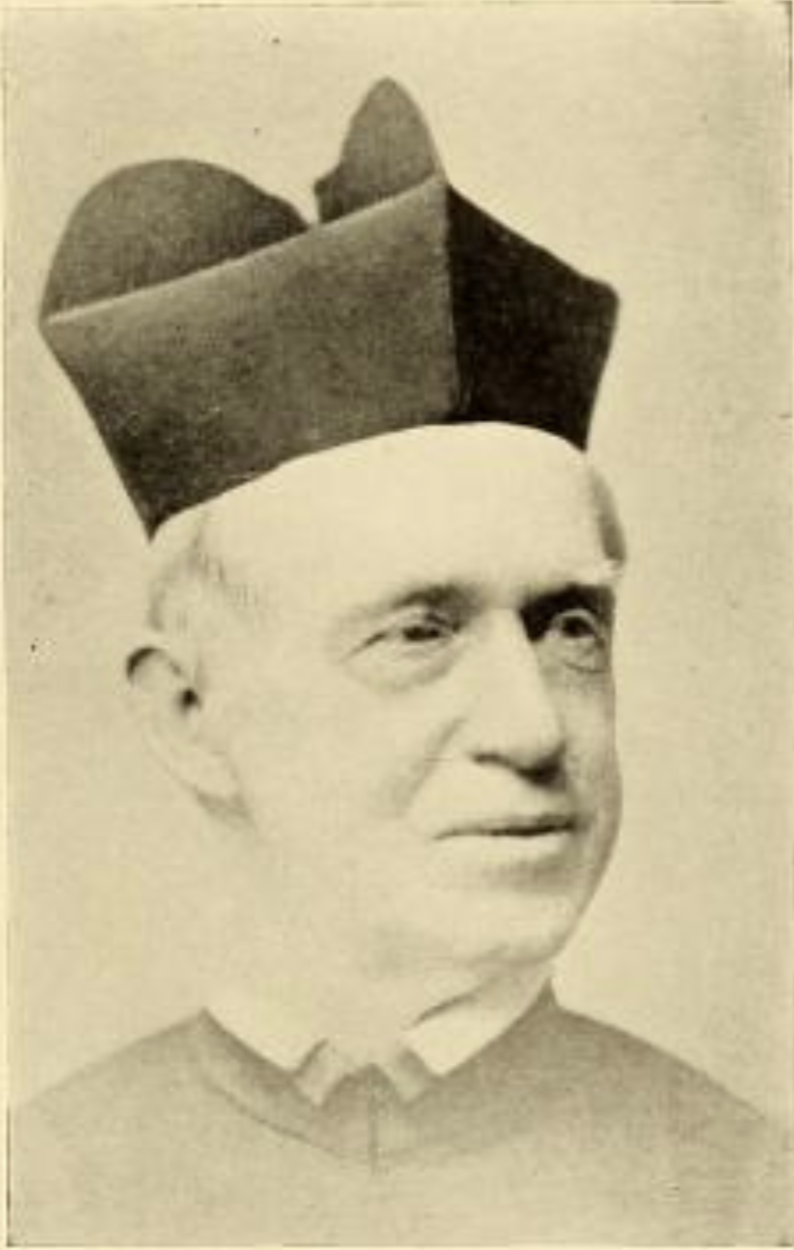

2nd President of Loyola College in Maryland
- In office 1858–1860
- Preceded by: John Early
- Succeeded by: Joseph O'Callaghan

Personal details
- Born: March 19, 1816 City of Washington, District of Columbia, U.S. (Note: The City of Washington was a separately chartered city within the District of Columbia until the consolidation of the district's governments into a single entity, Washington, D.C., with the Organic Act of 1871.)
- Died: October 17, 1890 (aged 74) Washington, D.C., U.S.
- Resting place: Jesuit Community Cemetery
- Education: Gonzaga College; Georgetown College

Orders
- Ordination: July 4, 1842 by Samuel Eccleston

William Francis Clarke (March 19, 1816 – October 17, 1890) was an American Catholic priest and Jesuit who held several senior positions at Jesuit institutions in Maryland and Washington, D.C. Born in Washington, he descended from several early colonial families of Maryland. He was educated at Gonzaga College and its successor institutions during the suppression of the Society of Jesus, followed by Georgetown College. After his entrance into the Jesuit order, he taught for several years at Georgetown, and became the pastor of St. Joseph's Church in Baltimore, where he took uncommon measures to integrate black Catholics and Italian immigrants into parish life.

In 1858, he became the president of Loyola College in Maryland, remaining only two years before becoming the president of Gonzaga College and rector of St. Aloysius Church, which were impacted by the onset of the American Civil War. His term ended in 1861, and he returned to Loyola College as procurator. He spent his final years as a noted preacher and theologian.

== Early life ==
William Francis Clarke was born on March 19, 1816, in the City of Washington in the District of Columbia. His ancestry on his father's side included Robert Clarke, one of the founders of the British Colony of Maryland, and a member of the colonial Maryland General Assembly. On his mother's side, his ancestry included some of the early settlers of Maryland, North Carolina, and Kentucky.

=== Education ===
He was educated at Gonzaga College. When the Society of Jesus was suppressed worldwide, the Jesuit president of Gonzaga, Jeremiah Keily, disobeyed his superiors by attempting to continue the operation of the school. He informed the parents, including Clarke's, that classes would resume at a new location on Capitol Hill, without informing them of the school's official closure by the superiors. As a result, Keily was eventually dismissed from the Jesuit order. Clarke attended Keily's school for two years, before Keily transferred leadership to a Virginia educator named Hughes, who relocated the school to East Capitol Street. Eventually, Clarke matriculated at Georgetown College on March 1, 1829, at the unusually young age of 13. He soon placed at the top of his classes each month, and graduated with honors in July 1833.

=== Teaching ===
Clarke entered the Society of Jesus on August 14, 1833, and was sent to the Jesuit novitiates at White Marsh Manor, and then Frederick, Maryland. After one year, he was appointed a professor of third grammar at Georgetown College, and two years later, he transitioned to teaching first grammar. By 1839, he was teaching second grammar. Beginning in 1840, he was again engaged in full-time study of philosophy and theology. On July 4, 1842, he was ordained a priest by the Archbishop of Baltimore, Samuel Eccleston. In 1844, he was charged with giving lectures on Catholic doctrine, which he continued to deliver until his death. The following year, he became a professor of philosophy at Georgetown. He then became socius (assistant) to the master of novices in Frederick in 1846.

== Ministry and leadership ==
His health rapidly failed in 1846 and, fearing for his life, his superiors sent him to Bohemia Manor, Maryland, to recuperate. He remained there for four years, and his health slowly improved. Eventually, he was appointed pastor of St. Joseph's Church in Baltimore in 1849. Notably, he would give brief homilies at Sunday Masses, which was uncommon at the time. Clarke took many measures to integrate black Catholics into the life of St. Joseph's parish. He opened a girls' school run by the Sisters of Charity and a boys' school. He established the first sodality for black Catholics in the Archdiocese of Baltimore, and introduced the Oblate Sisters of Providence, an order of black religious sisters, to the parish, placing them in charge of a school. He also had black altar boys serve at Benedictions of the Blessed Sacrament. In addition, he had Fr. Vicinanza deliver sermons in Italian for the Italian immigrants in the parish, representing the first Italian religious services in the archdiocese.

=== Academia ===
In 1858, Clarke resigned as pastor of St. Joseph's upon his appointment as president of Loyola College in Maryland. Succeeding John Early, he remained for only two years, before being appointed president of Gonzaga College in Washington, D.C., to replace Charles H. Stonestreet. He was succeeded as president of Loyola College by Joseph O'Callaghan in July 1860. Simultaneous with his appointment at Gonzaga, he became pastor of the adjacent St. Aloysius Church. He also succeeded John Early as pastor of St. Ignatius Church in the city in October 1858, and held the post until he was replaced by O'Callaghan the following year.

He assumed the posts on the cusp of the American Civil War, when tensions where high in the capital city. Within six months of his taking office, the number of students at Gonzaga had reduced by half. In addition to his administration of the College, he also opened a parochial school in the basement of St. Aloysius for younger students. On the day of its opening, there were 250 students in attendance. This parochial school was moved to a property owned by Senator Stephen Douglas that he rented on I Street on September 24, 1860. His presidency of Gonzaga came to an end in 1861, and he was succeeded by Bernardin F. Wiget. He returned to Loyola College as procurator on August 19, 1861. There, he also frequently preached in the nearby St. Ignatius Church.

== Later years ==
Clarke's tenure at Loyola College came to an end in August 1888, when he returned to Gonzaga College to teach and perform ministerial work at St. Aloysius Church. In his later years, he remained an active preacher, delivering sermons to mark major occasions and anniversaries in Baltimore, Washington, and Philadelphia. He came to be considered an authority who was consulted on theological questions, and he catechized students, resulting in a substantial number of conversions to Catholicism. Clarke died on October 17, 1890, at Gonzaga College, and was buried in the Jesuit Community Cemetery at Georgetown.

== Notes ==
Catholic Church titles
Preceded by John Early	2nd Pastor of St. Ignatius Church; 1858–1859	Succeeded by Joseph O'Callaghan
Preceded by –	Pastor of St. Joseph's Church; 1849–1858	Succeeded by –
Preceded by Charles H. Stonestreet	2nd Pastor of St. Aloysius Church; 1860–1861	Succeeded by Bernardin F. Wiget
Academic offices
Preceded by John Early	2nd President of Loyola College in Maryland; 1858–1860	Succeeded by Joseph O'Callaghan
Preceded by Charles H. Stonestreet	10th President of Gonzaga College High School; 1860–1861	Succeeded by Bernardin F. Wiget
