= Charles H. Stonestreet =

19th-century American Jesuit priest

The Very Reverend Charles H. Stonestreet SJ
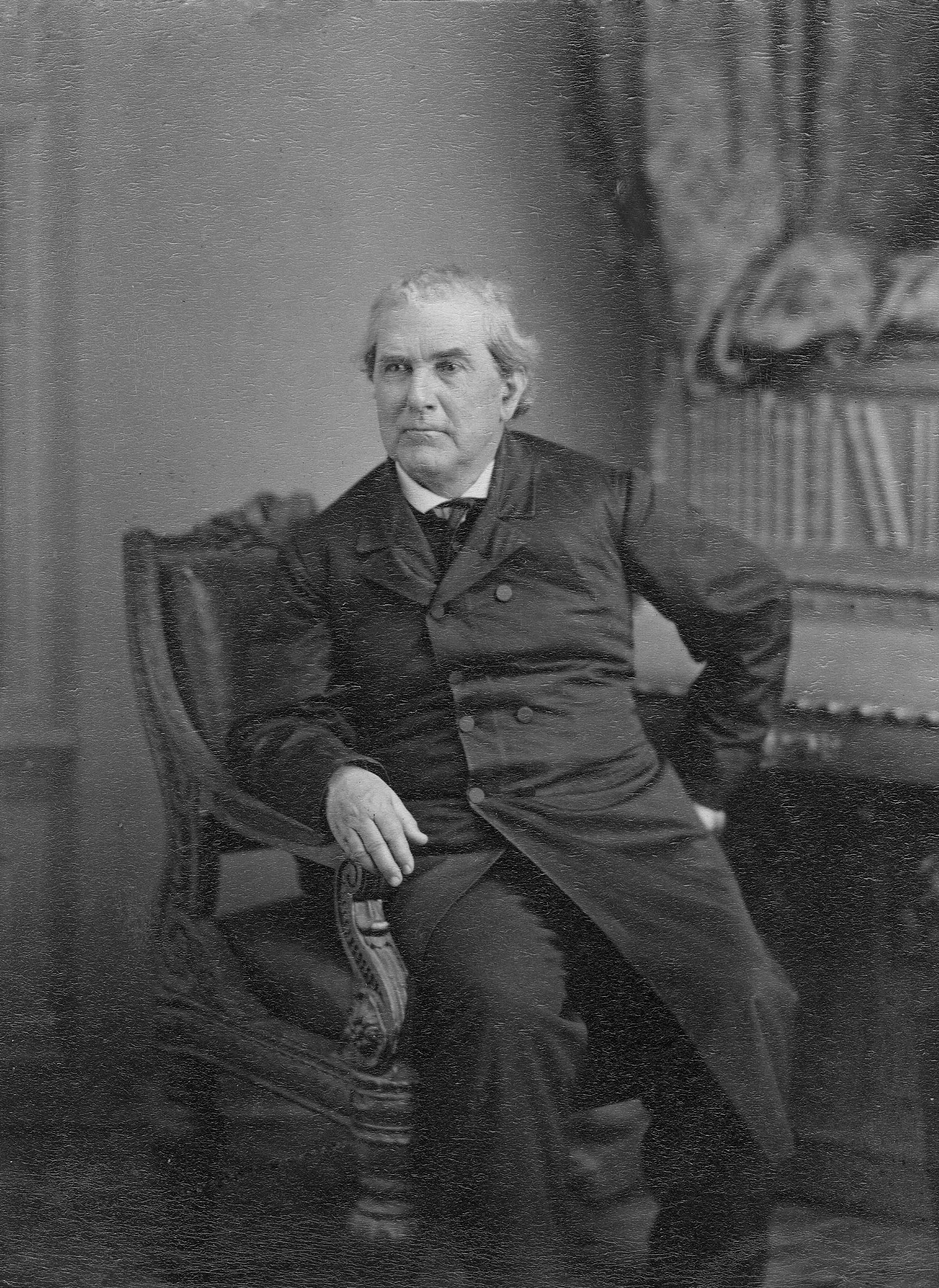
- Photograph of Stonestreet

24th President of Georgetown University
- In office 1851–1852
- Preceded by: James A. Ryder
- Succeeded by: Bernard A. Maguire

Personal details
- Born: November 21, 1813 Port Tobacco, Maryland, U.S.
- Died: July 3, 1885 (aged 71) Worcester, Massachusetts, U.S.
- Education: Georgetown University (BA)

Orders
- Ordination: July 4, 1843

Charles Henry Stonestreet SJ (November 21, 1813 – July 3, 1885) was an American Catholic priest and Jesuit who served in prominent religious and academic positions, including as provincial superior of the Jesuit Maryland Province and president of Georgetown University. He was born in Maryland and attended Georgetown University, where he co-founded the Philodemic Society. After entering the Society of Jesus and becoming a professor at Georgetown, he led St. John's Literary Institution and St. John the Evangelist Church in Frederick, Maryland. He was appointed president of Georgetown University in 1851, holding the office for two years, during which time he oversaw expansion of the university's library. The First Plenary Council of Baltimore was held at Georgetown during his tenure.

As provincial superior, Stonestreet worked with Anthony Ciampi in the aftermath of the devastating fire at the College of the Holy Cross, and addressed growing anti-Catholicism. Owing to violence from the Know Nothings, he forbade Jesuits from wearing their clerical attire in public or being addressed by their ecclesiastical titles. He later became president of Gonzaga College, where he oversaw the establishment and construction of St. Aloysius Church, of which he became the first pastor. In 1863, Stonestreet was involved in the legal incorporation of Boston College, and testified in court as to his knowledge of the conspirators in the assassination of President Abraham Lincoln, specifically Mary Surratt and Samuel Mudd. Later, he was assigned to Georgetown, parishes throughout Maryland and Washington, D.C., including as pastor of Holy Trinity Church in Georgetown, and Holy Cross, where he lived out his last years.

== Early life and education ==
Charles Henry Stonestreet was born on November 21, 1813, in Port Tobacco in Charles County, Maryland. His father was a distinguished lawyer who intended for Charles to enter the legal profession. Charles attended a classical school run by Philip Briscoe in St. Mary's County, before enrolling in Georgetown University in Washington, D.C., where he graduated in 1833.

There, he was a member of the Philodemic Society, and one of its founders, as he was among the group of students to sign the society's founding constitution in 1830. He delivered a speech at the 1830 commencement ceremony titled "The Claims of Aristotle on Posterity," as well as one at the graduation ceremony of 1833 titled "On Ancient Literature." Following his graduation, he entered the Society of Jesus on August 14, 1833. On July 28, 1835, Stonestreet officially received his Bachelor of Arts. While studying philosophy as a Jesuit scholastic, he taught French, mathematics, and grammar at Georgetown.

== Early career ==
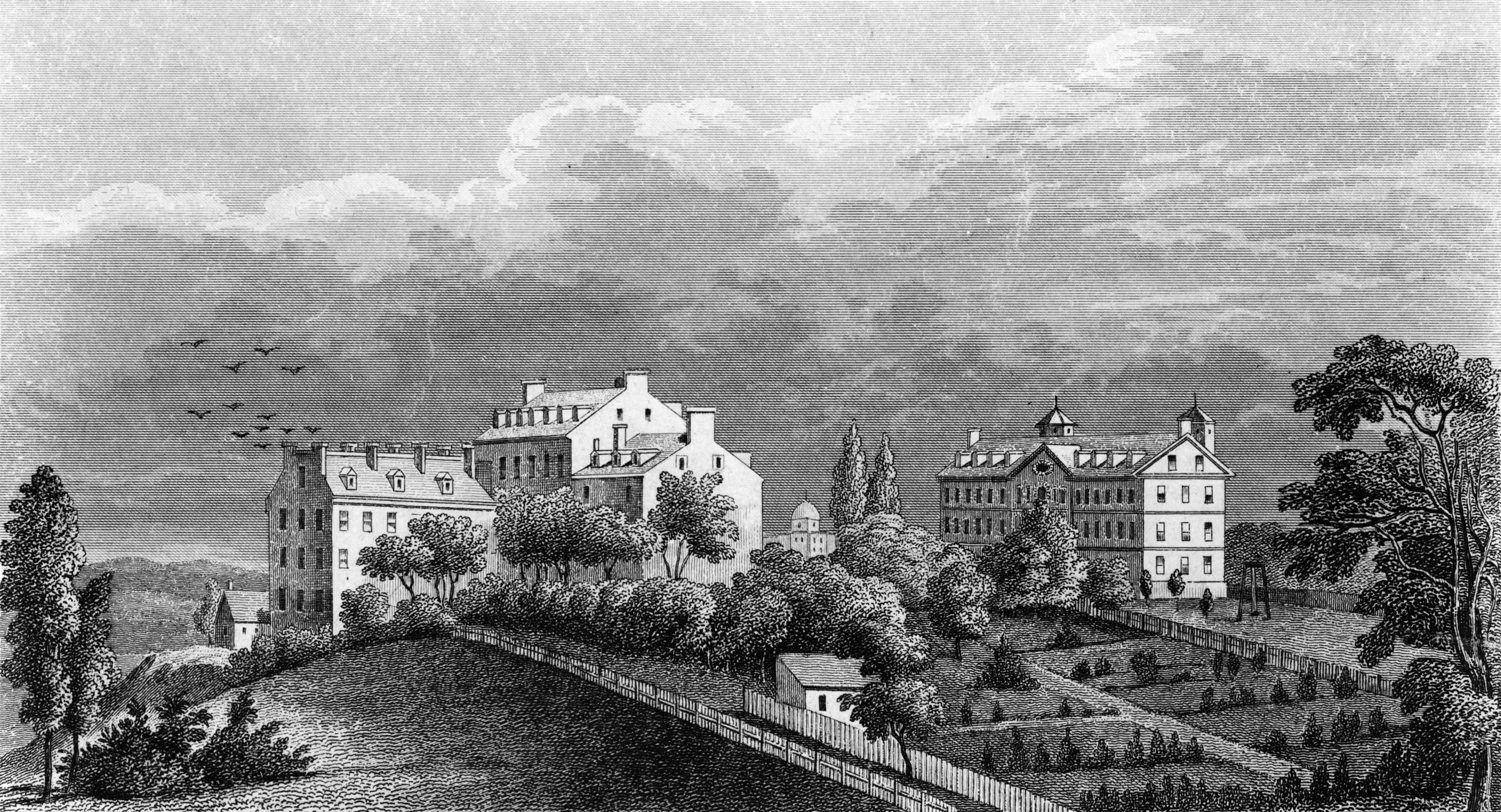
Georgetown University in the mid-19th century, with the new observatory in the background

Stonestreet then became a professor and prefect at Georgetown. As the prefects were only slightly older than the students among whom they enforced discipline, Stonestreet complained that the students were so disobedient that discipline would sometimes come to mutual blows between the prefect and students, comparing himself to a "prizefighter." During this time, James Curley was working on establishing the Georgetown Astronomical Observatory. While working on acquiring all the instruments needed to outfit the building, he informed Stonestreet in the winter of 1841 that he would need to purchase a meridian circle. Stonestreet offered him the $2,000 (equivalent to $62,000 in 2025) that his mother had bequeathed to him, which Curley used to obtain the instrument and begin using the observatory. On one occasion, Stonestreet was accompanying a group of thirty students on their annual vacation to St. Inigoes, Maryland. En route, their stagecoach overturned due to a reckless driver. All the passengers suffered only minor injuries, except Stonestreet, who was badly injured and sent back to Georgetown.

On July 4, 1843, Stonestreet was ordained a priest. He was sent on a mission to Alexandria, Virginia, before being appointed president of St. John's Literary Institution in Frederick, Maryland, in 1848, where he remained until 1850. At the same time, he was assigned to St. John the Evangelist Church in Frederick, Maryland, as an assistant curate to Thomas Lilly. Shortly after, he became the pastor of St. John the Evangelist Church, and remained there for two years. During this time, he had three assistants, one of whom was Anthony F. Ciampi. Simultaneously, he took charge of St. John's Literary Institution that year, succeeding Lilly as president. His tenure at both the church and the school came to a close at the end of 1850, and he was succeeded by Thomas F. Mulledy.

== Georgetown University ==
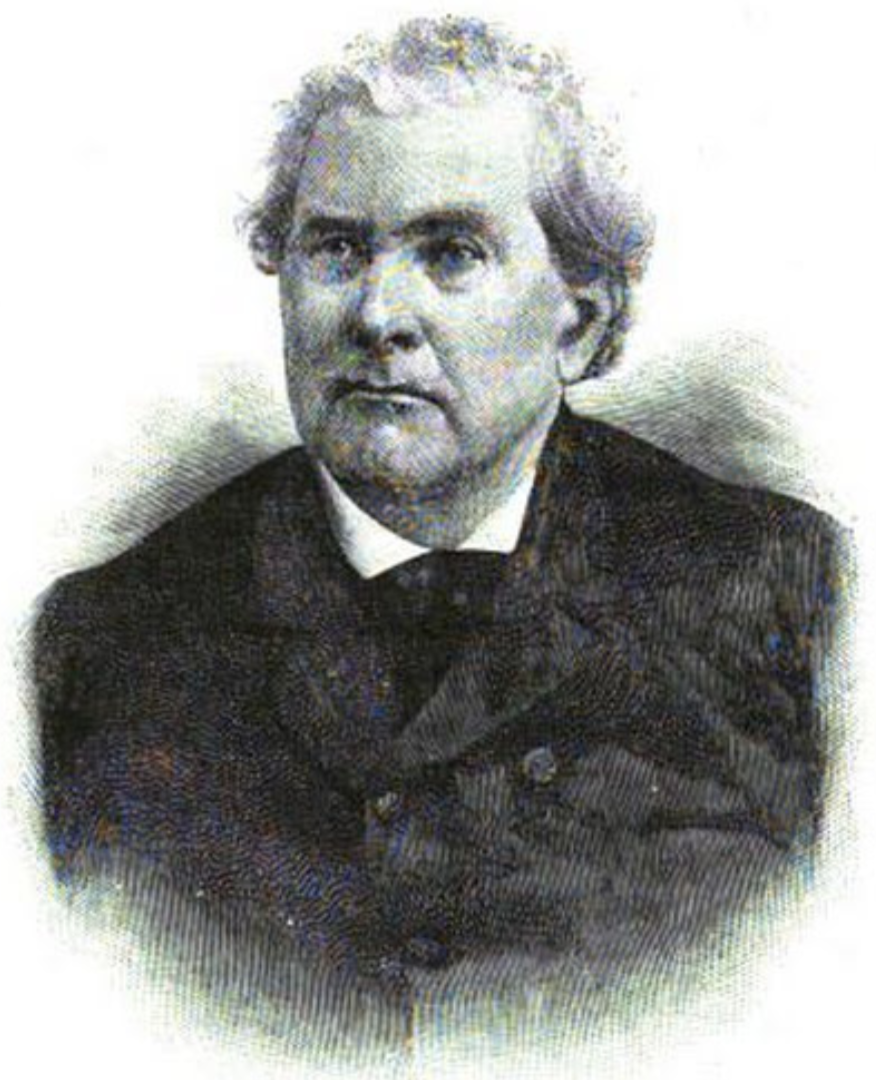
Drawing of Stonestreet

Stonestreet assumed the Presidency of Georgetown University on August 1, 1851. In May 1852, he commemorated the landing of the Catholic pilgrims in the Maryland Colony by traveling to St. Inigoes, Maryland, with Bishops James Oliver Van de Velde of Chicago, Richard Pius Miles of Nashville, and John Baptist Miège of the Indian Territory East of the Rocky Mountains. During Stonestreet's tenure, the First Plenary Council of Baltimore was held at the college in 1852. This involved the arrival of twelve bishops, a mitred abbot, and two religious superiors. That year, the Medical Department participated in the commencement ceremony for the first time, awarding its first four medical doctorates. During this time, the Georgetown library saw significant growth, including almost 900 books that Stonestreet had shipped from Rome. This period of growth was so substantial that the library in Old North became filled to capacity, and Stonestreet sought to construct a larger facility.

Administration of the university by the generally lax Stonestreet was praised by the provincial superior in a June 1852 report to the Jesuit Superior General. His placid demeanor was a stark contrast to that of his predecessor, James A. Ryder, and he was well liked by the faculty and students. Under his predecessors, enforcement of discipline in Catholic practices increased, and eventually, Catholic students were required to confess twice a month. Faced with a generally unruly student body, Stonestreet noted how the students least willing to obey authority were those raised in the slaveholding culture of the South, where they previously enjoyed great indulgence of their antics. The several Chilean students successfully petitioned to be relieved of the requirement's frequency. That August, he accepted an appointment as provincial superior of the Maryland Province of the Society of Jesus; Bernard A. Maguire was named as his successor.

== Maryland provincial ==
The provincial superior of the Maryland Province of the Society of Jesus, Ignatius Brocard, died suddenly in the summer of 1852, and Stonestreet was named by the Superior General, Jan Roothaan, as his replacement, taking office on August 15. He was the first Marylander to hold the office who had not been trained in Rome.

=== Holy Cross disaster ===
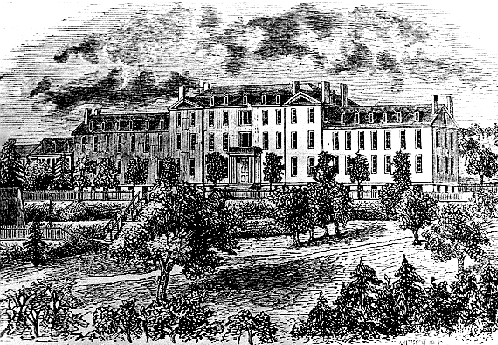
Fenwick Hall at the College of the Holy Cross was nearly totally destroyed by fire in 1852.

Stonestreet took office in the immediate aftermath of a disastrous fire at the College of the Holy Cross in Worcester, Massachusetts, on July 14, which destroyed the college's main building, Fenwick Hall, and most of its contents. The school's president, Anthony F. Ciampi, vowed to rebuild, while another influential Jesuit there, Joseph Aschwanden, was staunchly opposed to reopening the school. Stonestreet traveled to Worcester to mediate the controversy, and he reassigned the twenty Jesuits at the school, leaving only Ciampi and Peter J. Blenkinsop to attend to the ruined school and farm. Stonestreet discussed with Thomas Mulledy whether the Jesuit constitution allowed him to close the school, to which Mulledy responded that it did not. Stonestreet finally wrote to Roothaan, concluding that the school should be rebuilt, even if it meant assumption of much of the school's debt by the Jesuit province. Roothaan eventually delegated the decision on whether to rebuild to Stonestreet.

=== Management of the province ===
For many years, the Jesuit leadership had discussed establishing a scholasticate for the education of new Jesuits. They sought to separate it from Georgetown, which educated lay students as well as scholastics, and required that the scholastics teach alongside their studies. The new Superior General, Peter Beckx, proposed in 1855 that Georgetown be transformed into such a scholasticate for training all the Jesuits in the United States, and cease educating lay students. Stonestreet objected to this proposal and eventually, the focus turned to establishing a dedicated scholasticate elsewhere.

Stonestreet responded to increasing anti-Catholicism in Maryland, specifically the allegation that the Jesuits swore an oath to the pope to overthrow the United States, by writing a letter to local newspapers in February 1855 in which he described his patriotic pride and attachment to his childhood home on the Western Shore of Maryland. As the Know Nothing movement grew in anticipation of the 1856 presidential election, so did Stonestreet and the other Maryland Jesuits' worries; Stonestreet wrote to Rome in the spring of 1856 that they were in the midst of a crisis. Due to the violence of the 1840s and 1850s perpetrated by the Know Nothings, he forbade Jesuits from wearing their clerical attire in public or be addressed by their ecclesiastical titles, instead using secular styles of address such as "doctor" instead of "father."

== Gonzaga College and St. Aloysius Church ==
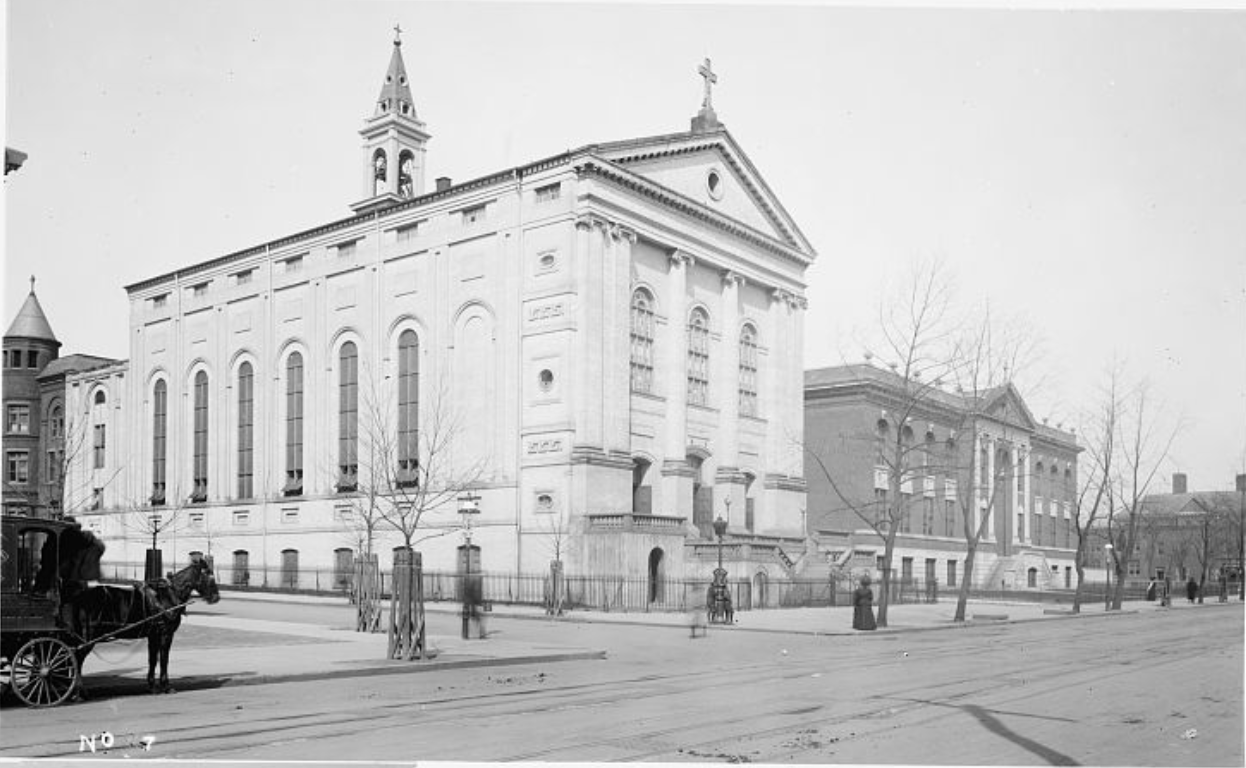
St. Aloysius Church (left) and Gonzaga College (right)

Upon the selection of Burchard Villiger as the provincial superior of the Maryland province, Stonestreet succeeded him as president of the Washington Seminary on April 25, 1858. Stonestreet petitioned Congress to grant the school its own congressional charter. Very shortly thereafter, on May 4, 1858, President James Buchanan signed into law the bill independently chartering the Washington Seminary, and recognizing the institution by its new name of Gonzaga College. With this charter came the school's independence from Georgetown University, under whose authority it previously conferred degrees; accordingly, ownership of school's property was transferred from Georgetown to Gonzaga. The school especially credited Representative Richard Henry Clarke with seeing the bill through Congress. The following day, Stonestreet officially declared that Washington Seminary had ceased to exist, and had been replaced by Gonzaga College, though it remained common parlance to refer to the school as the Old Seminary for some time. The school did not exercise its power to confer degrees until 1868, when the first four students completed their studies.

As president of Gonzaga, Stonestreet led the opening prayer of the House of Representatives on January 24, 1859, and of the Senate on February 9, 1859. During his term, the school's literary society, which had been founded in 1855, was renamed the Phocion Society, and Stonestreet was considered its founder. While president of Gonzaga College, Stonestreet oversaw the establishment and construction of St. Aloysius Church, which would be staffed by Jesuit priests whose service was no longer needed at the diocesan St. Patrick's Church. The church, designed by fellow Jesuit Benedict Sestini, was dedicated in November 1859; at its dedication, Archbishop John Hughes and James Ryder delivered sermons.

In 1860, he sent his resignation as president of the school to the Jesuit Superior General, relinquishing the presidency as well as his pastorate of St. Aloysius Church. William Francis Clarke was appointed as his successor.

== Civil War era and aftermath ==
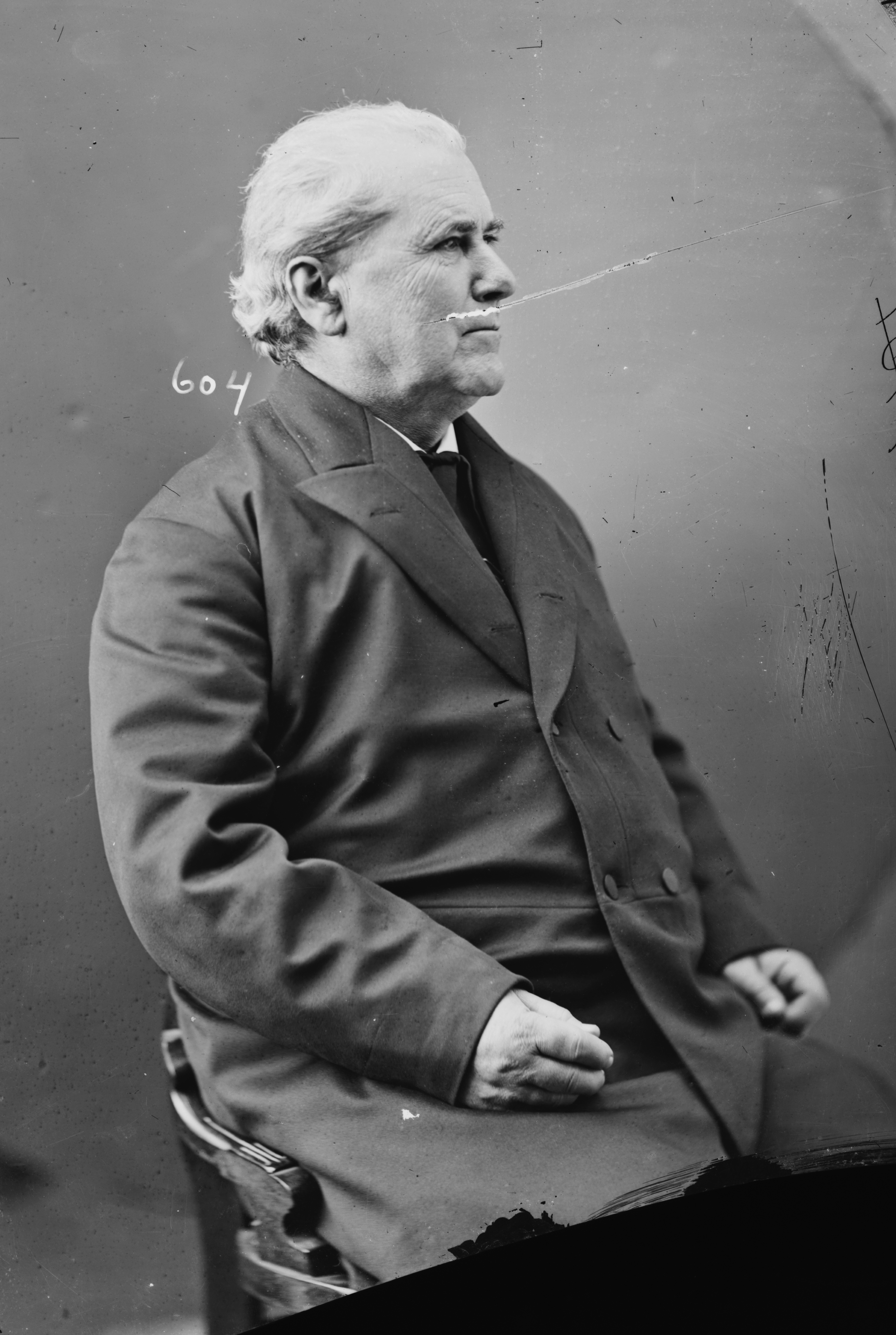
Photograph of Stonestreet from the studio of Brady-Handy

Following his term at Gonzaga College, Stonestreet was appointed prefect of schools and a professor of rhetoric at Georgetown. During the Civil War, the Jesuit superiors ordered the Jesuits at Georgetown to remain publicly neutral with respect to the two belligerents. However, the majority of Jesuits and students at the school were aligned with the Confederacy; members of Stonestreet's family fought in the war for the South. He also became the Jesuit procurator to the superiors in Rome. Stonestreet served on the board of directors of Georgetown from 1861 to 1862 and from 1863 to 1864, as well as during his time as president of the university.

On March 31, 1863, the Massachusetts General Court incorporated Boston College. Stonestreet was named in the charter as one of five Jesuits who were the officers of the corporation. In 1864 and 1865, he ministered to the mission church congregation of St. Mary's in Hagerstown, Maryland.

=== Trial of the Lincoln conspirators ===
In 1865, Stonestreet testified in the trial of the conspirators in the assassination of President Abraham Lincoln. He stated that he had known Mary Suratt, a parishioner of St. Aloysius Church, for more than 20 years and that while he had only infrequently seen her in the past 14 years, he had never known her to espouse treason. This testimony occurred against the backdrop of growing suspicion of Catholics, as several suspects proved to be Catholics; some who were suspicious of Catholics went so far as to accuse the Catholic Church of involvement in the assassination.

He was also called to testify about Samuel Mudd, the physician who attended to John Wilkes Booth's fractured leg. He asserted that in 1850, Mudd was a student at St. John's Literary Institution, during Stonestreet's presidency of the school, and that he did not know whether Mudd remained at the school during the Christmas vacation of December 1850.

=== Later years ===
Stonestreet returned as a parish priest to St. John the Evangelist Church in Frederick in the late 1860s. When the president of Gonzaga College and rector of St. Aloysius Church, Bernardin F. Wiget, fell ill in 1868, Stonestreet was temporarily again appointed to the two offices, until August 1869 when James Clark became the permanent replacement.

While the health of Bernard Maguire, the president of Georgetown, worsened in 1869, Stonestreet was considered again as president. The new provincial superior, Joseph Keller, decided against the nomination, due to his age; instead, John Early was appointed. Stonestreet became the pastor of Holy Trinity Catholic Church in Georgetown in 1870, where he remained for four years. Finally, Stonestreet was made spiritual father at the College of the Holy Cross in 1880. Before long, his health deteriorated around 1883, and he died on July 3, 1885.

Academic offices
Preceded by Thomas Lilly	3rd President of St. John's Literary Institution; 1848–1850	Succeeded by Thomas F. Mulledy
Preceded by James A. Ryder	24th President of Georgetown University; 1851–1852	Succeeded by Bernard A. Maguire
Preceded by Burchard Villiger as President of Washington Seminary	9th President of Gonzaga College; 1858–1860	Succeeded by William Francis Clarke
Catholic Church titles
Preceded by Thomas Lilly	Pastor of St. John the Evangelist Church; 1848–1850	Succeeded by Thomas F. Mulledy
Preceded by Ignatius Brocard	7th Provincial Superior of the Jesuit Maryland Province; 1852–1858	Succeeded by Burchard Villiger
New office	1st Pastor of St. Aloysius Church; 1858–1860	Succeeded by William Francis Clarke
Preceded by Louis Hippolyte Gache	22nd Pastor of Holy Trinity Catholic Church; 1870–1874	Succeeded by John B. DeWolf
