= List of presidents of Loyola University Maryland =

The current president of Loyola University Maryland is Terrence M. Sawyer, J.D. Sawyer, who became the 25th president of Loyola on Jan. 1, 2022, started his career at Loyola in 1998 as special assistant to the president for government and community relations, where he worked extensively to create and maintain positive relationships with Loyola's neighboring communities and government officials.

In 2004 he was named vice president for administration, where he served as liaison to the Board of Trustees and oversaw the departments of human resources, public safety, environmental health and safety, and parking and transportation, while also continuing his government and community relations duties. In 2015, he was named vice president for advancement and he most recently served as senior vice president, leading the division of advancement as well as alumni relations, career services, and marketing and communications. In addition, he is an affiliate professor in Loyola's Sellinger School of Business and Management.

In recent years, under Sawyer's leadership, the University raised more than $100 million through the Bright Minds, Bold Hearts campaign, the largest campaign in Loyola's history, which significantly grew the University's endowment and student scholarship support. During his tenure, Sawyer also led the advancement team in raising funds to support strategic capital projects, including the Miguel B. Fernandez Family Center for Innovation and Collaborative Learning, which opened in Fall 2021.

Sawyer was instrumental in developing and launching the York Road Initiative, where Loyola collaborates with neighbors and partners in the Govans community to bring positive change in the areas of civic capacity, education, and economic and business development.

Under his leadership as senior vice president, Sawyer oversaw an advancement team that secured multi-million dollar gifts to support the construction of the Fernandez Center of Innovation and Collaborative Learning, a career services team that has re-envisioned the University's approach to the discernment and pursuit of careers for its students and alumni; and the office of marketing and communications.

Sawyer is a graduate of the Ignatian Colleagues Program, a program run by the Association of Jesuit Colleges and Universities that is designed to educate and form administrators and faculty more deeply in the Jesuit and Catholic tradition of higher education. During the program, Sawyer completed the Spiritual Exercises and participated in an immersion experience in El Salvador. In June 2016, he walked in the steps of St. Ignatius on a pilgrimage through Spain and Italy.

A native of Wayne, N.J., Sawyer earned his bachelor's degree in government and politics from the University of Maryland, College Park, a Juris Doctor degree from the Widener University School of Law, and completed the Harvard Graduate School of Education's Institute for Educational Management program. Prior to working at Loyola, Sawyer was an attorney for the Maryland Department of Business and Economic Development and practiced civil and criminal law in Baltimore City. He is a member of the Maryland State Bar.

Sawyer's wife, Courtney, is a speech pathologist who earned her Master of Science in Speech-Language Pathology from Loyola University Maryland.

== List of presidents ==
1. Rev. John Early, S.J. (1852–1858)
2. Rev. William Francis Clarke, S.J. (1858–1860)
3. Rev. Joseph O'Callaghan, S.J. (1860–1863)
4. Rev. Anthony Ciampi, S.J. (1863–1866)
5. Rev. John Early, S.J (1866–1870)
6. Rev. Edward Henchy, S.J. (1870–1871)
7. Rev. Stephen A. Kelly, S.J. (1871–1877)
8. Rev. Edward A. McGurk, S.J (1877–1885)
9. Rev. Francis Smith, S.J. (1885–1891)
10. Rev. John Abell Morgan, S.J. (1891–1900)
11. Rev. William P. Brett, S.J. (1900–1901)
12. Rev. John F. Quirk, S.J. (1901–1907)
13. Rev. W. G. Read Mullan, S.J (1907–1908)
14. Rev. Francis X. Brady, S.J. (1908–1911)
15. Rev. William J. Ennis, S.J. (1911–1918)
16. Rev. Joseph McEneany, S.J. (1918–1926)
17. Rev. Henri J. Wiesel, S.J. (1927–1934)
18. Rev. Joseph A. Canning, S.J. (1934–1938)
19. Rev. Edward B. Bunn, S.J. (1938–1947)
20. Rev. Francis X. Talbot, S.J. (1947–1950)
21. Rev. Thomas J. Murray, S.J. (1950–1955)
22. Rev. Vincent Beatty, S.J. (1955–1964)
23. Rev. Joseph A. Sellinger, S.J. (1964–1993)
24. Rev. Harold Ridley, S.J. (1994–2005)
25. Rev. Brian F. Linnane, S.J. (2005–2021)
26. Terrence M. Sawyer (January 1, 2022– )
