= Bernard A. Maguire =

Irish-American Jesuit priest

The Reverend Bernard A. Maguire SJ
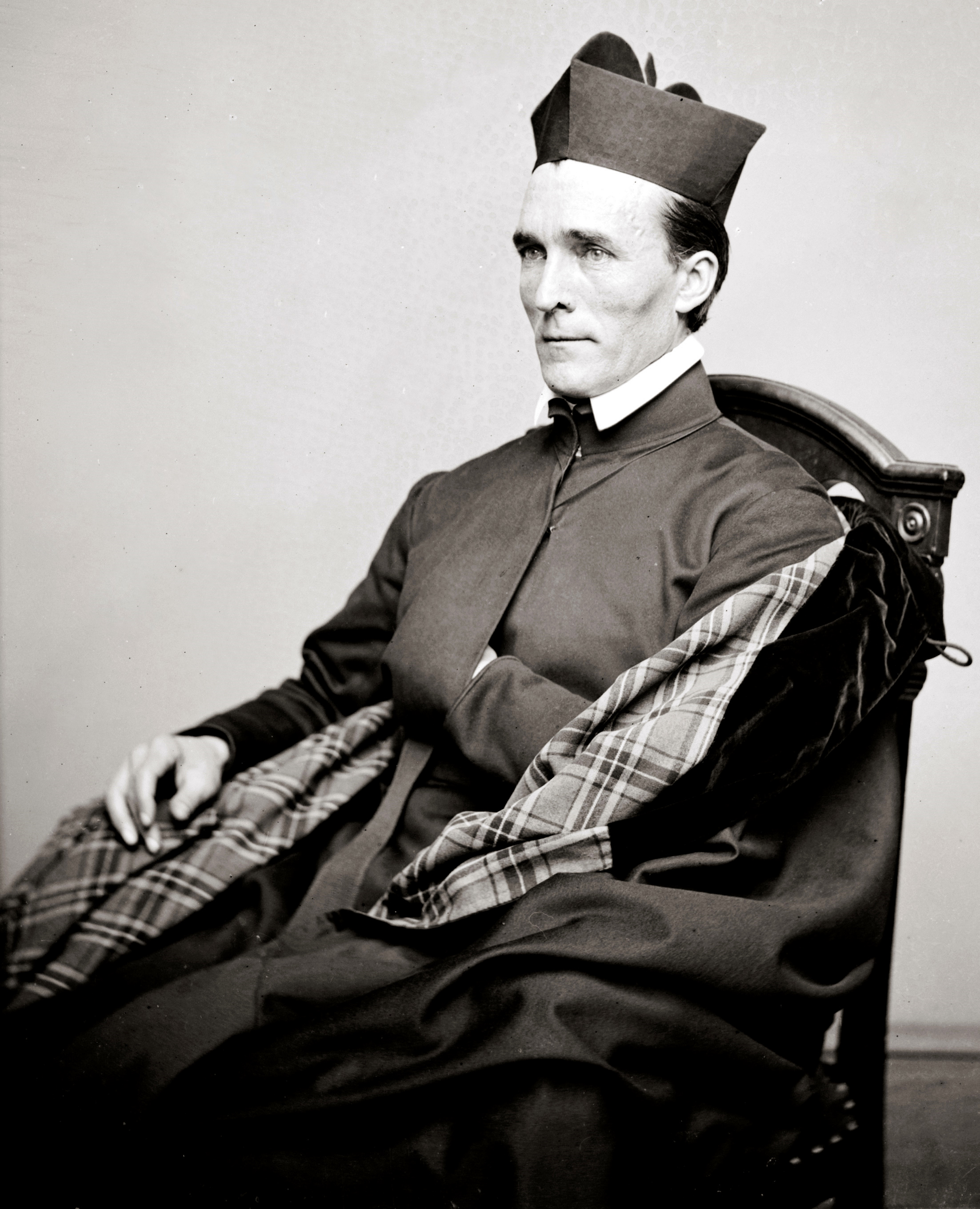
- Maguire in 1866

25th & 27th President of Georgetown University
- In office 1866–1870
- Preceded by: John Early
- Succeeded by: John Early
- In office 1853–1858
- Preceded by: Charles H. Stonestreet
- Succeeded by: John Early

Personal details
- Born: February 11, 1818 Edgeworthstown, County Longford, Ireland
- Died: April 26, 1886 (aged 68) Philadelphia, Pennsylvania, U.S.
- Resting place: Jesuit Community Cemetery
- Education: Saint John's College; Georgetown University

Orders
- Ordination: September 27, 1851 by John McGill

Bernard A. Maguire SJ (February 11, 1818 – April 26, 1886) was an Irish-American Catholic priest and Jesuit who served twice as the president of Georgetown University. Born in Ireland, he emigrated to the United States at the age of six, and his family settled in Maryland. Maguire attended Saint John's College in Frederick, Maryland, and then entered the Society of Jesus in 1837. He continued his studies at Georgetown University, where he also taught and was prefect, until his ordination to the priesthood in 1851.

In 1852, Maguire was appointed president of Georgetown University. His tenure is regarded as successful; new buildings were erected, the number of students increased, and the preparatory division was partially separated from Georgetown College. Upon the end of his presidency in 1858, he engaged in pastoral and missionary work in Washington, D.C., Maryland, and Virginia, and developed a reputation as a skilled preacher. In the aftermath of the American Civil War, which devastated the university, Maguire again became president of Georgetown in 1866. The long-planned Georgetown Law School was established at the end of his presidency. His term ended in 1870, and he returned to missionary work, traveling throughout the country. He died in Philadelphia in 1886.

== Early life ==
Bernard A. Maguire was born on February 11, 1818, in Edgeworthstown, County Longford, Ireland. He emigrated to the United States with his parents, at the age of six. They took up residence near Frederick, Maryland, where his father worked on the construction of the Chesapeake and Ohio Canal. John McElroy, a Catholic priest, periodically visited the Maguires and other families working on the canal project. He thought Bernard would be suitable for the priesthood and ensured that he received an education. McElroy enrolled Maguire at Saint John's College in Frederick, a Jesuit school of which McElroy was president. Among Maguire's professors there was Virgil Horace Barber. In school, Maguire and his classmate, Enoch Louis Lowe, were continually at the top of their class, and they participated in oratory declamations together.

=== Jesuit formation ===
On September 20, 1837, Maguire entered the Society of Jesus, and proceeded to the Jesuit novitiate in Frederick, where he was supervised by Francis Dzierozynski. He then began his higher education at Georgetown University; from 1839 to 1840, he studied rhetoric, and from 1840 to 1841, philosophy. While studying the latter, he also served as prefect of the university. His time at Georgetown was paused during the 1842–1843 academic year, while he taught mathematics and was the prefect at Saint John's College; he also oversaw the school's library and museum. Afterwards, Maguire returned to Georgetown, where he taught grammar, mathematics, and French; for the academic year of 1845 and 1846, he ceased teaching grammar so that he could again become prefect.

In 1846, Maguire began his theological education for the priesthood. He took leave of his studies during the academic year of 1849–1850 to catechize the students at Georgetown. During that time, there was an uprising among the students, stemming from a dispute between the Philodemic Society and the first prefect over when the club were permitted to hold meetings. As tensions escalated, the first prefect, Burchard Villiger, expelled three students, prompting an uproar among the student body. Believing the expulsion applied to all the students involved in the dispute, 40 students left the university and took up residence in hotels in Washington. They wrote the prefect demanding that they be allowed to return without punishment and that the first prefect be replaced by someone new.

After word of this standoff reached the local newspapers, Maguire met with the students to persuade them to peacefully return. Eventually, the students agreed to unconditionally return and issued an apology. At the same time, Villiger resigned as first prefect, and Maguire was selected to replace him. On September 27, 1851, he was ordained a priest by John McGill, the Bishop of Richmond.

== First presidency of Georgetown University ==
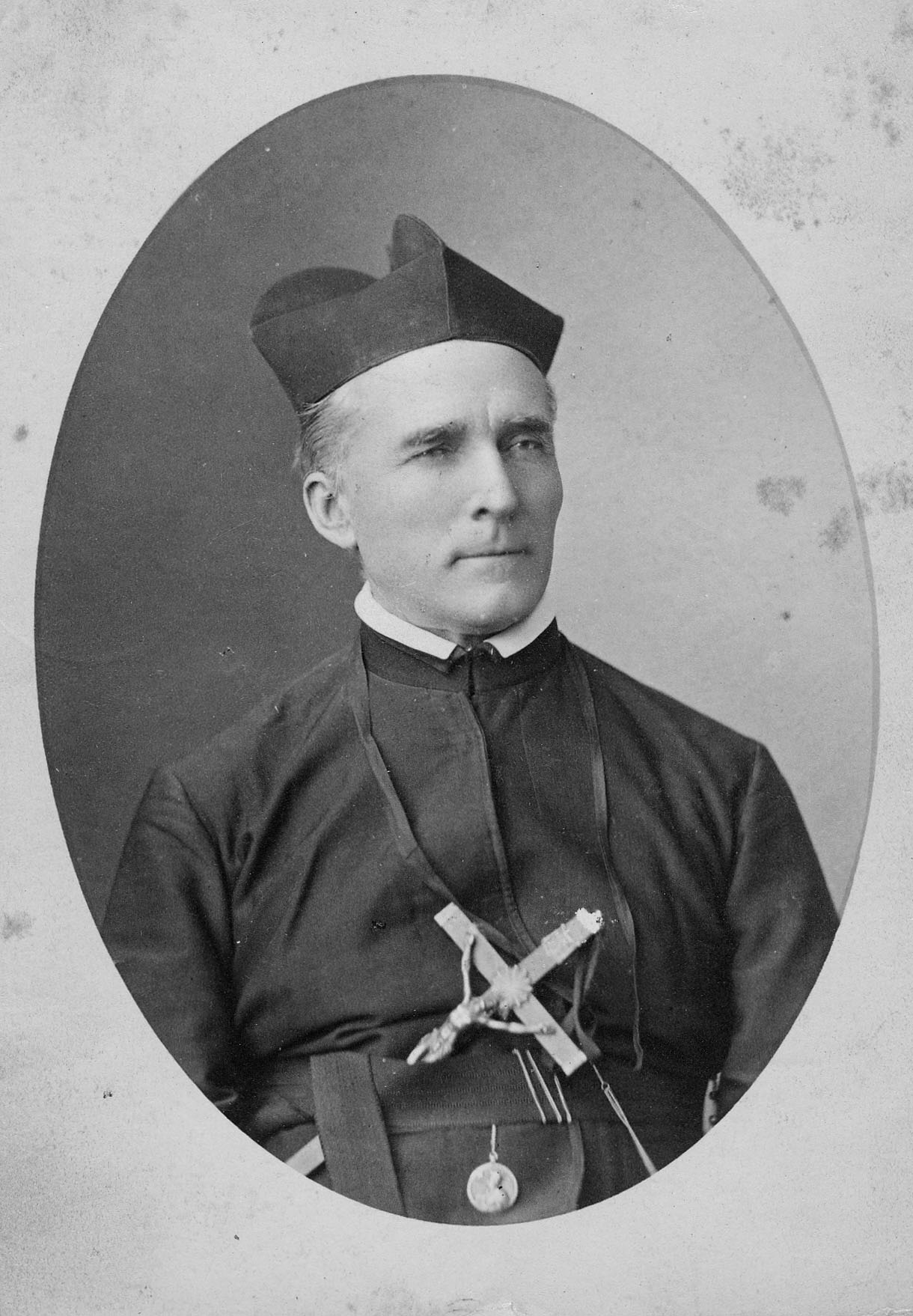
Photograph of Maguire

During his tertianship from 1851 to 1852, which was supervised by Felix Cicaterri, Maguire was elected to succeed Charles H. Stonestreet as the president of Georgetown University in December 1852. Soon thereafter, the Jesuit Superior General confirmed Maguire's election by the board of directors. Maguire officially assumed the office on January 25, 1853. As president, he was well liked by the students, despite having a reputation for being stern. Some students were displeased with the prefect's imposition of discipline and Maguire's declination to overrule him; they staged another uprising, throwing stones and inkwells to break the windows. The rebellion was quickly quashed after a lecture at breakfast the following morning, in which Maguire appealed to the students' sense of honor. Six students were expelled as a result.

Maguire promoted dramatic and literary societies among the students. In April 1853, the university was visited by the Catholic intellectual Orestes Brownson, and the commencement of 1854 was attended by Franklin Pierce, the president of the United States. A fire broke out on December 6, 1854, destroying the shed where the tailor and shoemaker worked. The university's vice president noticed the fire during the night and awoke others who prevented it from spreading to the other buildings.

Despite the construction of new buildings, a significant increase in the number of students left Georgetown pressed for physical accommodations. Therefore, Maguire sought to erect another building, but these plans were rendered untenable by the Panic of 1857. The economic crisis also made it difficult for the university to hire a sufficient number of faculty. Historian Robert Emmett Curran regards Maguire's tenure as being overall successful. On October 5, 1858, his term came to an end and he was succeeded by John Early.

=== Preparatory division ===
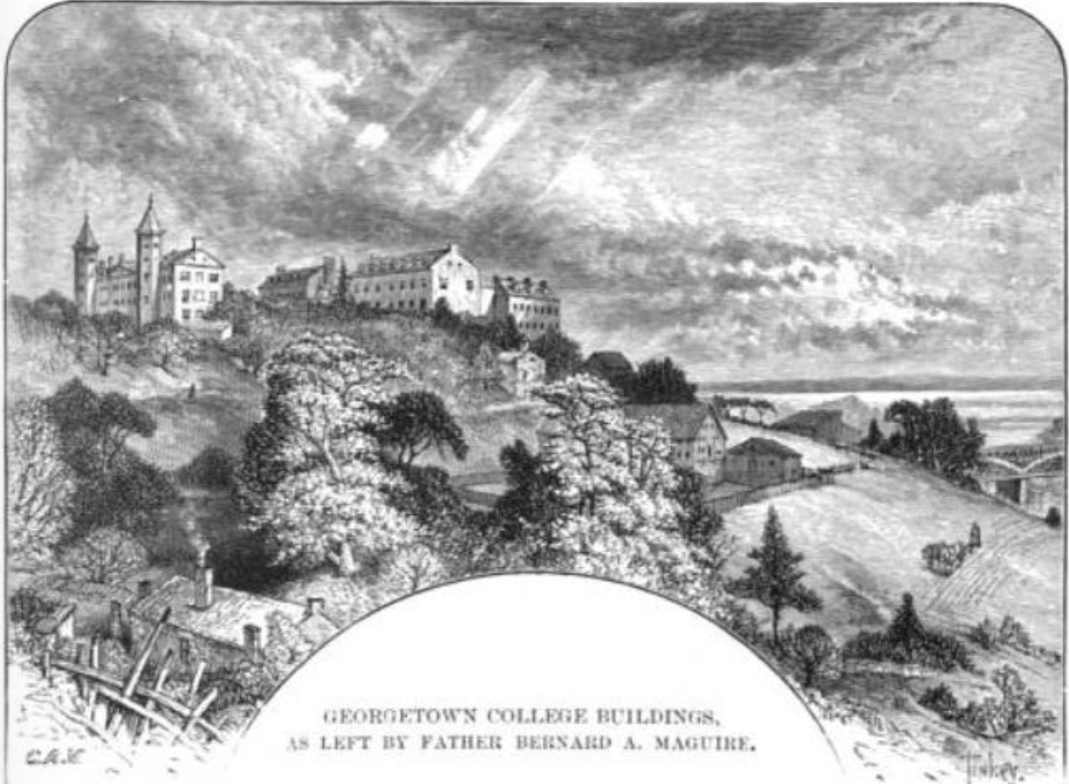
Georgetown's campus at the end of Maguire's first presidency

Several improvements were made to the university's facilities during Maguire's presidency. The preparatory division (which later became Georgetown Preparatory School) was separated from Georgetown College in 1851, both to reduce any negative influence of the older students on the younger ones and because the intermixing of ages dissuaded some older students from attending Georgetown's higher education division. The preparatory division was further segregated with the creation of separate housing for the younger students in 1852 and the institution of a separate academic calendar in 1856. This separation was effective in producing a significant increase in the number of college-aged students enrolling.

Construction on a separate building for the preparatory division began in June 1854. The five-story building connected the two buildings to its east and west, and contained a playroom, public hall, classrooms, study hall, and dormitory space. More modest than was originally envisioned several years before, the Preparatory Building cost $20,000 and was complete by the commencement of 1855. It was outfitted with new gas lamps, rather than oil lamps. The Preparatory Building was later renamed Maguire Hall.

== Pastoral work ==
After his first presidency at Georgetown, Maguire was sent to be the pastor at St. Joseph's Church in Baltimore in 1858. His first time engaging in pastoral work, Maguire garnered a reputation as a skilled orator. In 1859, he was transferred to St. Aloysius Church in Washington, D.C., where his renown as a preacher grew, and his sermons caused many Protestants to convert to Catholicism. Maguire left St. Aloysius at the end of 1864 for Frederick, Maryland, from where he traveled as a missionary throughout Maryland and Virginia. This missionary work also produced conversions to Catholicism.

== Return to Georgetown ==
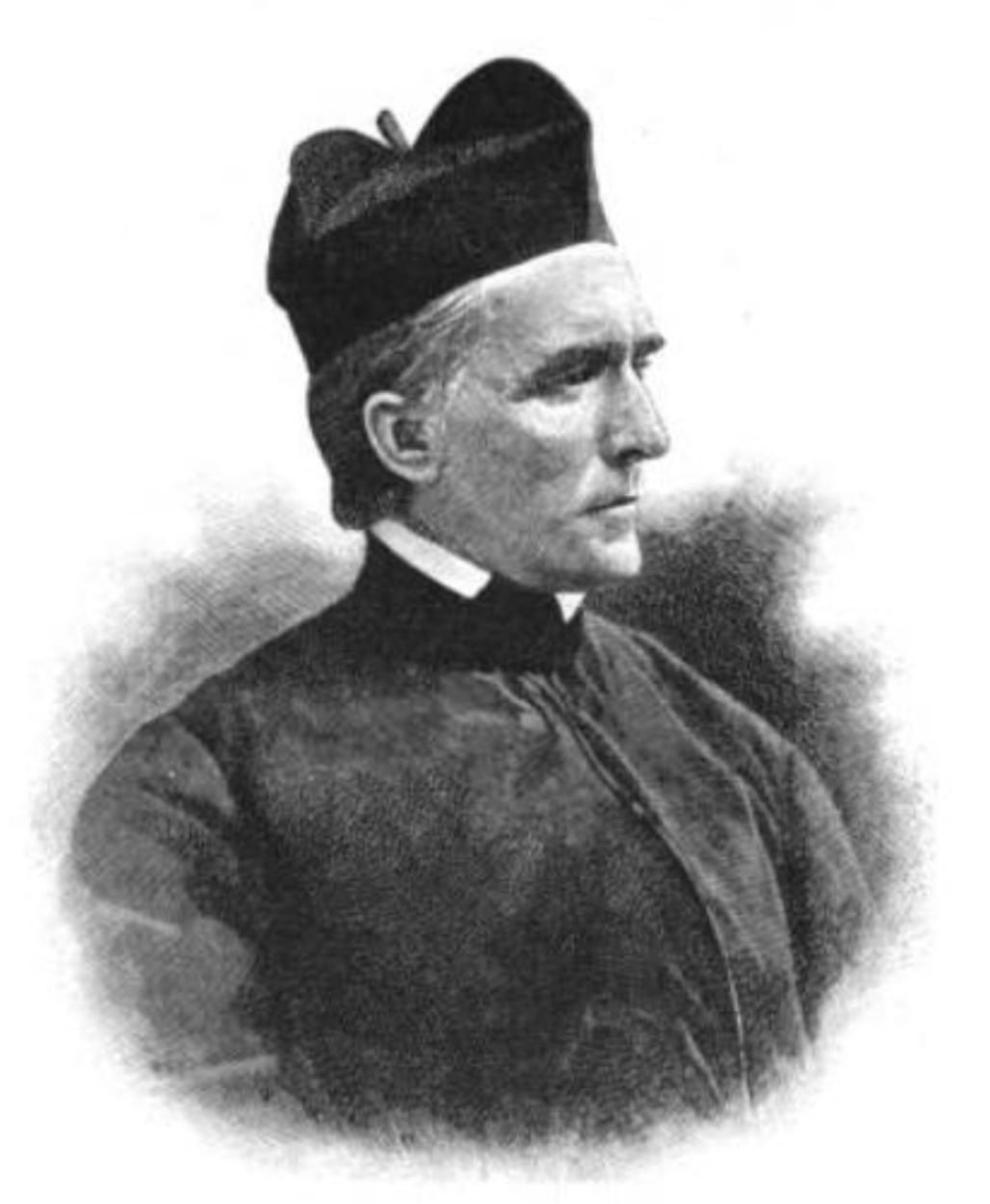
Portrait of Maguire in profile

Maguire became the president of Georgetown University for a second time on January 1, 1866. Replacing John Early, he took office in the aftermath of the American Civil War. Enrollment at the university had declined precipitously during the war, and few students remained by the time Maguire took office. From 1859 to 1861, the number of students dropped from 313 to 17. As a result of the decreased enrollment, the university was left in a precarious financial state. By the end of Maguire's term, the number of students had begun to rebound. Georgetown's physical campus also suffered during the war, which Maguire described as being "nearly ruined." Upon the end of the 1866 academic year in July, he immediately began to repair and expand the buildings that were damaged from being used as barracks and a military hospital by the Union Army. Within three months, the work was complete. To symbolize post-war national unity, Maguire adopted the respective colors of the Union and Confederate Armies, blue and gray, as the school's official colors.

Discussions about creating a law school began during Early's presidency but were suspended due to the war. At the suggestion of a future university president, Patrick F. Healy, these discussions resumed and became more concrete by 1869. Eventually, the university's board of directors approved the establishment of Georgetown Law School in March 1870. Maguire desired the law school to be more integrated with the rest of the university than the medical school, which operated largely autonomously. He selected the first six faculty members and announced the creation of the new school at the university commencement in June 1870. The law school's first classes began in October.

President Ulysses S. Grant attended the commencement of 1869 and conferred the degrees. That year, the Jesuit scholasticate, which trained Jesuits in their religious formation, was moved from Georgetown to Woodstock, Maryland, becoming the independent Woodstock College. Maguire's health had begun to deteriorate by 1869, and the new provincial superior, Joseph Keller, began considering potential successors, in consultation with the Jesuit superiors in Rome. Maguire's tenure came to an end in July 1870, and John Early was again named as his successor.

== Later years ==
Following his second presidency of the university, Maguire returned to St. Aloysius Church as the pastor. He preached regularly until retiring from the position in May 1875. He returned to missionary work, preaching in Canada and San Francisco. He resigned these duties when health prevented him from continuing in 1884.

In April 1886, Maguire led a retreat on Passion Sunday at Old St. Joseph's Church in Philadelphia, Pennsylvania, after having just finished leading a triduum for men at the Cathedral of the Assumption in Baltimore. On the third day of the retreat, he fell ill and was taken to St. Joseph's Hospital, where he received last rites and died on April 26, 1886. His requiem mass was held at St. Aloysius Church in Washington, and he was buried at the Jesuit Community Cemetery at Georgetown University.

Academic offices
Preceded by Charles H. Stonestreet	25th President of Georgetown University; 1853–1858	Succeeded by John Early
Preceded by John Early	27th President of Georgetown University; 1866–1870	Succeeded by John Early
Catholic Church titles
Preceded by –	Pastor of St. Aloysius Church; 1870–1875	Succeeded by Anthony F. Ciampi
