= David M. Edelstein =

American political scientist

- Citizenship: American
- Education: Colgate University (BA); University of Chicago (MA, PhD)
- Occupations: Political scientist; international relations scholar
- Employer: Georgetown University

David M. Edelstein is an American political scientist and international relations scholar. He is currently Dean of the College of Arts & Sciences at Georgetown University.

== Education ==
Edelstein holds a B.A. from Colgate University and a M.A. and Ph.D. from the University of Chicago.

== Academic career ==
Edelstein joined Georgetown's faculty in 2002, with dual appointments in the Walsh School of Foreign Service and College of Arts & Sciences. He was appointed vice provost for education in May 2023 and the next dean of Georgetown's College of Arts & Sciences in February 2025, succeeding Rosario Ceballo, effective July 1, 2025.

== Publications ==
=== Articles ===
- Delusions of Grand Strategy, Foreign Affairs, October 20, 2015 (co-authored with Ronald R. Krebs)
- Is Hagel tying America’s hands (and is that a bad thing)? The Washington Post, February 24, 2014

Academic offices
Preceded by Rosario Ceballo	Dean of Georgetown University College of Arts & Sciences; Beginning July 1, 2025	Vacant
