= W. G. Read Mullan =

American Jesuit and academic

The Reverend W. G. Read Mullan SJ
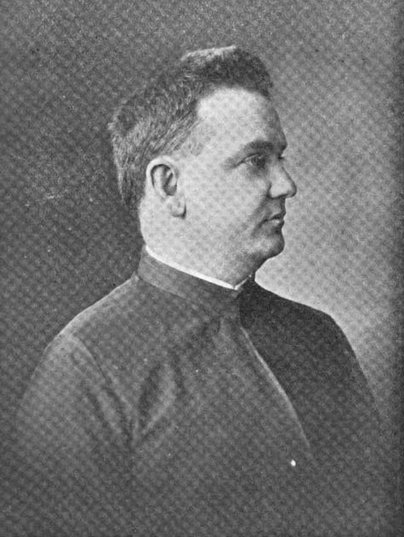

13th President of Loyola College in Maryland
- In office 1907–1908
- Preceded by: John F. Quirk, SJ
- Succeeded by: Francis X. Brady, SJ

11th President of Boston College
- In office June 30, 1898 – 1903
- Preceded by: Timothy Brosnahan, SJ
- Succeeded by: William F. Gannon, SJ

Personal details
- Born: January 28, 1860 Baltimore, Maryland, U.S.
- Died: January 25, 1910 (aged 49) Baltimore, Maryland, U.S.
- Resting place: Jesuit Cemetery, Woodstock, Maryland, United States
- Parent(s): John P. Mullan; Emily Susannah Adam
- Education: Loyola University Maryland; Woodstock College

Ordination history of W. G. Read Mullan
History
Priestly ordination
- Ordained by: James Gibbons

William George Read Mullan, SJ (January 28, 1860 – January 29, 1910), was an American Jesuit and academic who served as President of Boston College from 1898 to 1903 and President of Loyola University Maryland from 1907 to 1908.

== Early life and education ==
William G. Read Mullan was born on January 28, 1860, in Baltimore, Maryland, United States, to John P. and Emily Susannah Mullan (née Adam). His father was a sexton at the Cathedral of the Assumption of the Blessed Virgin Mary in Baltimore, as was his father before him. He was named after an orator and family friend William G. Read Jr. A great-great aunt on his father's side, Catharine Mullan, was one of the first to join Elizabeth Ann Seton and the Sisters of Charity.

As a child, Mullan completed his primary education at the parochial school at the Church of the Immaculate Conception in Baltimore. He began attending Loyola College in Maryland in 1874, graduating in 1877. Shortly before graduating, he applied for admission to the Society of Jesus. In 1877, he was admitted as a postulant and commenced studies at the Jesuit novitiate in Frederick, Maryland, where he remained until 1880. From 1880 to 1883, he studied rhetoric, philosophy, and science at Woodstock College, a Jesuit seminary in Woodstock, Maryland. In 1888, after five years teaching at Fordham University and Georgetown University, Mullan returned to Woodstock College where he was educated in theology.

In 1890 (one source dates it to 1892), he was ordained to the priesthood by Cardinal James Gibbons, the Archbishop of Baltimore.

== Career ==
After novitiate, Mullan taught classics and literature at St. John's College (now Fordham University) for four years, before becoming a professor of poetry at Georgetown University for one year. After returning to Woodstock College for his theological education, he returned to Fordham as Prefect of Studies, where he remained until 1897. Later, he returned to Woodstock College as Superior of Scholastics, before becoming a professor at the College of the Holy Cross.

In 1898, Mullan was appointed President of Boston College. He arrived on June 30, 1898, and received the books from his predecessor, Timothy Brosnahan. As president, he worked to ensure rigorous academic standards and took interest in the personal development of his students. He also served concurrently as rector of the Church of the Immaculate Conception.

In addition to his administrative duties, Mullan vigorously fought against anti-Catholicism in American academia. Most notably, he became involved in the controversy of President of Harvard University Charles W. Elliot's criticism of Boston College and Catholic education in general. Mullan protested Harvard Law School's removal of Boston College from its list of acceptable institutions for admission as a regular student, as well as Elliot's comments disparaging Jesuit universities. He combated this through private and public correspondence and through public speeches.

As president, Mullan also established the Sodality of Catholic College Alumni in 1900. He founded the organization after sending a letter on May 13, 1899, to all Boston College alumni, which read:

"I should be much pleased to meet the lay alumni of Boston College ... for the purpose of proposing to them the formation of a Sodality to be composed exclusively of Catholic graduates of Boston College and other colleges. I am fully convinced that such a gathering of educated Catholic men could be a power in the community to attract respect for our holy religion and for Catholic Education."

Mullan served as President of Boston College until 1903. After leaving Boston College, he served as a prefect at Fordham. He also became the vice president and prefect of studies at the Graduate School of Georgetown University. In 1907, Mullan became President of Loyola College in Maryland, but resigned because of ill health six months into his term. He was admitted to St. Agnes Hospital in Baltimore, where he remained until his death.

== Death and legacy ==
Mullan died at St. Agnes Hospital in Baltimore on January 25, 1910, at the age of 49, three days before his 50th birthday. He was buried at Woodstock Jesuit Cemetery in Woodstock, Maryland. After his death, a scholarship was created in his memory at Loyola College in Maryland. The $1,000 Read Mullan Scholarship was funded through collections by the Sodality of St. Ignatius Church in Baltimore, under the direction of Rev. John D. Whitney, SJ.

== See also ==
- List of presidents of Boston College
- List of presidents of Loyola University Maryland
