= Woodstock Letters =

Collection of letters published by the Society of Jesus

- Country: United States
- Language: English (primarily)
- Discipline: Ecclesiastical
- Publisher: Woodstock College
- Published: 1872–1969 (97 years)
- No. of books: 317
- OCLC: 1019824932

The Woodstock Letters were a periodical publication by the Society of Jesus. They were originally published by a Jesuit seminary, Woodstock College, in Maryland. The letters were intended for internal distribution among Jesuits in North America and later South America. The letters were to be the official record of the Jesuits' work in these continents. The Woodstock Letters typically give eyewitness assessments of the current events, historical notes about the colleges and missions of the Society of Jesus, enrollment statistics for Jesuit schools, detailed biographies and obituaries, institutional histories, notes from the Jesuit leadership, and reviews of books of interest to the society. The letters were often candid and detailed, giving a chronological narrative of American Jesuit affairs.

The letters were first published in January 1872 and counted 317 issues (about 98 bound volumes) before being discontinued in November 1969, after 97 years. Early volumes contained three issues each year, with volume I having numbers 1-3 in 1872. Many renowned Jesuit scholars and missionaries have writings in the letters, including Pedro Arrupe, Pierre-Jean de Smet, Avery Dulles, Daniel Lord, Walter Hill, John Courtney Murray, Walter Ong, and Gustave Weigel.

The letters were not intended for public view, but instead meant for internal communication among Jesuits. Issues were circulated "among Jesuits and their institutions" in North and later South America. Early issues were even stamped "For Jesuit use only" (often phrased "For circulation among Ours only" on the title page). Each issue was mailed to every major Jesuit province and institution.

As a result of its lengthy history, the Woodstock Letters is a large archive. The printed edition runs almost 50,000 pages, which covers nearly 13 feet of shelving. The bulk of each issue was in English, though some official letters and reports were printed in Latin. The title page contained the motto: "A record of current events and historical notes connected with the colleges and missions of the Society of Jesus."

By design, the Woodstock Letters provides an important record of American Jesuit history. Historians and researchers often cite the letters to research 19th- and 20th-century Jesuit activities. One scholar noted that the letters "provided updates on and reflections by American Jesuits for almost 100 years." The Woodstock Letters served as the Society of Jesus’s "publication of record".
