= John Early (educator) =

Irish-American priest and Jesuit educator (1814–1873)

The Reverend John Early SJ
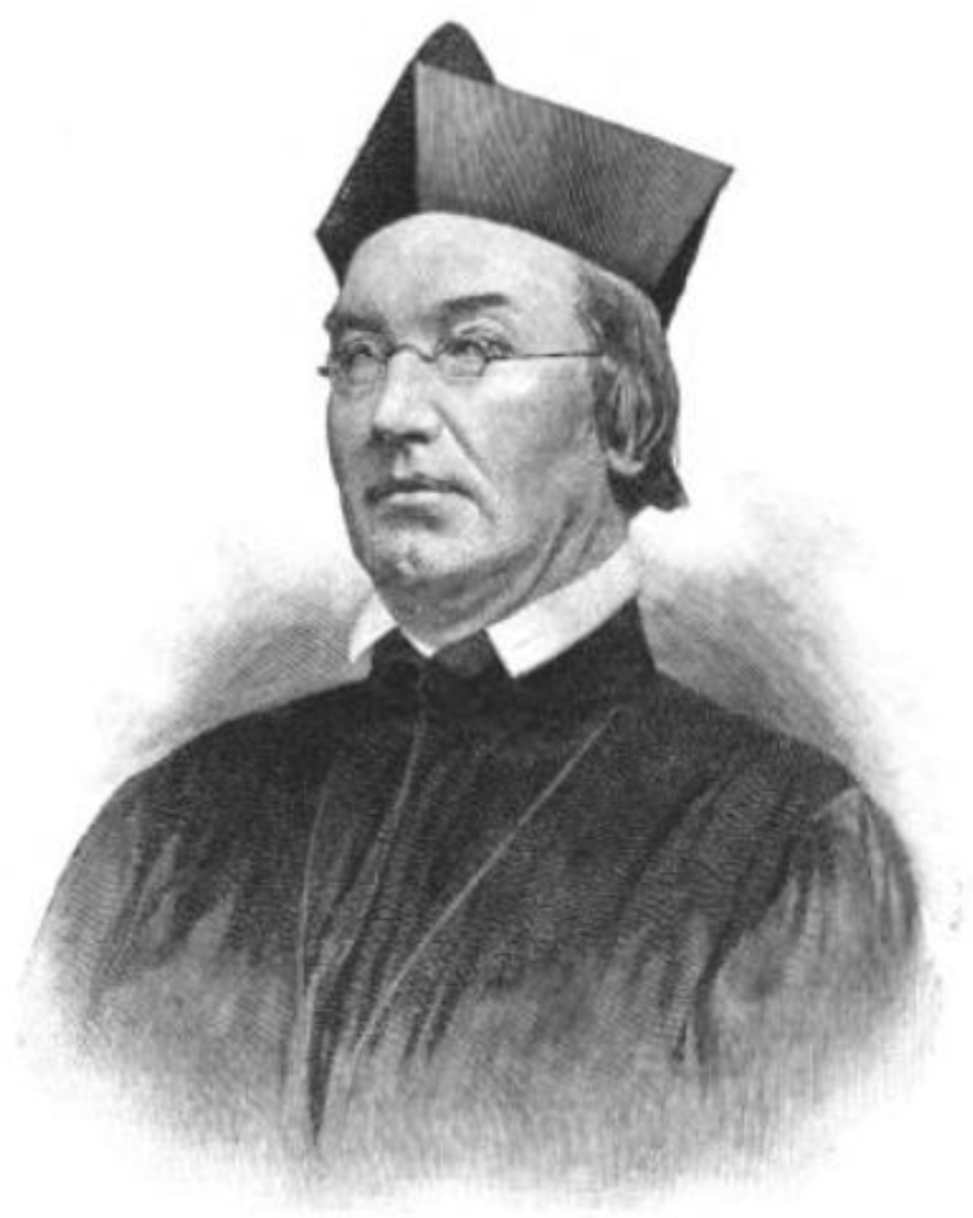

26th & 28th President of Georgetown University
- In office 1870–1873
- Preceded by: Bernard A. Maguire
- Succeeded by: Patrick Francis Healy
- In office 1858–1865
- Preceded by: Bernard A. Maguire
- Succeeded by: Bernard A. Maguire

1st & 5th President of Loyola College in Maryland
- In office 1866–1870
- Preceded by: Anthony F. Ciampi
- Succeeded by: Edward Henchy
- In office 1852–1858
- Succeeded by: William Francis Clarke

3rd President of the College of the Holy Cross
- In office 1848–1851
- Preceded by: James A. Ryder
- Succeeded by: Anthony F. Ciampi

Personal details
- Born: July 1, 1814 Maguiresbridge, County Fermanagh, Ireland
- Died: May 23, 1873 (aged 58) Washington, D.C., United States
- Resting place: Jesuit Community Cemetery
- Education: Mount St. Mary's Seminary; Georgetown University

Orders
- Ordination: July 1, 1845

John Early SJ (July 1, 1814 – May 23, 1873) was an Irish-American Catholic priest and Jesuit educator who was the president of the College of the Holy Cross and Georgetown University, as well as the founder and first president of Loyola College in Maryland. Born in Ireland, he emigrated to the United States at the age of nineteen. Upon his arrival, he enrolled at Mount St. Mary's Seminary in Maryland and entered the Society of Jesus, completing his education at Georgetown University in Washington, D.C.

Early became president of the College of the Holy Cross in 1848, where he unsuccessfully petitioned the Massachusetts legislature to charter the school. Four years later, he was charged with establishing Loyola College in Maryland, which was intended to educate the lay students who attended St. Mary's Seminary and College, which the Sulpicians sought to keep as a seminary only. While also serving as the first pastor of St. Ignatius Church, he oversaw the early years of Loyola College. He also established its high school division, which later became Loyola Blakefield. In 1858, Early left to become president of Georgetown University. During the Civil War, instruction continued uninterrupted, despite intermittent occupation by the Union Army and dwindling enrollment.

Early then returned to Loyola College in 1866 as president for four years, where he resumed the annual conferral of degrees. In 1870, he once again became president of Georgetown University. He died suddenly in his third year of office.

== Early life ==
John Early was born on July 1, 1814, in Maguiresbridge, County Fermanagh, Ireland. He studied the classics at home, before entering the Armagh Academy in 1832, which he attended for nine months. He then applied for admission to the seminary at St Patrick's College, Maynooth, but there were no vacancies, and he was not admitted. As a result of his failure to gain admission to the seminary, Early emigrated to the United States in July 1833.

=== Education in the United States ===
Seeking to become a priest, Early enrolled at Mount St. Mary's Seminary in Emmitsburg, Maryland, the following September to study rhetoric. In February 1834, he advanced to Georgetown University in Georgetown, D.C. (now a part of Washington, D.C.), where he remained until August 23, 1834, when he entered the Society of Jesus, and proceeded to the novitiate in Frederick, Maryland. Upon the completion of his novitiate in 1836, Early returned to Georgetown for the next nine years to study philosophy and theology. While studying, he also taught and was head prefect during the academic year of 1843 to 1844.

On July 1, 1845, Early was ordained a priest at Holy Trinity Church in Georgetown. He then taught philosophy at Georgetown for two years, and ministered as a missionary in Laurel, Maryland. He began ministering at Old St. Joseph's Church in Philadelphia in 1847. He professed his fourth vow on September 8, 1853.

== College of the Holy Cross ==
On August 29, 1848, Early was appointed president of the College of the Holy Cross, succeeding James A. Ryder. His most immediate concern was securing a charter for the college, which would allow it to confer degrees on the four students who were ready to graduate the following year. Up to that point, the college awarded degrees in the name of Georgetown University, as it had been denied a charter. In March 1849, Early petitioned the Massachusetts General Court to charter the college, and appeared before the legislature alongside Orestes Brownson.

In accordance with Bishop John Bernard Fitzpatrick's insistence, the petition for a charter included a provision that the college would be exclusively for the "benefit of one [Roman Catholic] denomination only, and, therefore, having no claims whatever upon the Commonwealth." This was met with opposition in the House of Representatives, which was motivated by a mix of both anti-Catholicism and concerns about the separation of church and state. This provision was eventually removed, but the legislature nonetheless voted to deny the charter. Early's term came to an end in 1851, and he was succeeded by Anthony F. Ciampi. Early then returned to Frederick, Maryland for a year.

== Founding Loyola College in Maryland ==
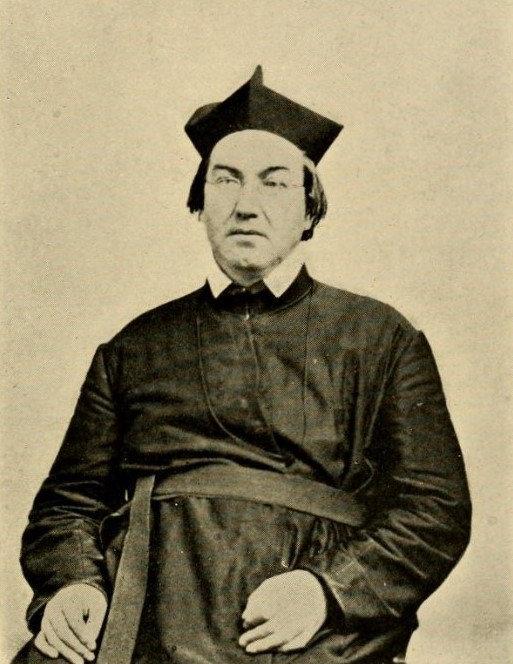
Early in clerical attire

In 1852, the Sulpician priests who ran St. Mary's Seminary and College in Baltimore decided that they would discontinue the college portion, which educated lay students, and focus only on the seminary. They asked the Jesuits to continue educating the laity in the city, and in response, the Jesuits established Loyola College in Maryland on September 15, 1852, in two rented houses on Holliday Street in Baltimore. Early was appointed the school's first president. The Maryland General Assembly granted Loyola College a charter in April 1853. At the same time as the college's founding, St. Ignatius Church. Early became its first pastor, and oversaw building of the church in August 1855, adjacent to the college. The church was consecrated on August 15, 1856. Early is also considered the founder of Loyola Blakefield, which was established as Loyola High School and operated as a component of Loyola College until its separation in 1921.

Two years after its founding, the college purchased a plot of land on the corner of North Calvert and Madison Streets. Construction of a college building was completed in February 1855, and the college officially relocated to the new campus on February 22. Being called to Georgetown University, Early's tenure as president came to an end in the autumn of 1858, and he was succeeded by William Francis Clarke. He remained as pastor of St. Ignatius until October 1858, and was succeeded by Clarke.

== Georgetown University ==
Early was appointed to succeed Bernard A. Maguire as president of Georgetown University in 1858. He took office during a time of great national tension, preceding the Civil War. Soon thereafter, he received notice from the College of William & Mary that its library had been destroyed by fire; Early donated a case of 100 books to aid it in rebuilding. In 1860, Abraham Lincoln was elected president of the United States, and the southern states seceded from the Union. At the start of the academic year of 1861, many southern students left the college for their homes, followed by northern students doing the same. Though it looked doubtful that the college would be able to continue operating, Georgetown endured as an active school, carrying on with classes throughout the Civil War for the few remaining students.

On May 4, 1861, Early was notified that the college would be commandeered by the 69th Infantry Regiment of the New York National Guard, which remained until May 24. Shortly thereafter, he was again informed that the school would be occupied by the 79th New York Regiment, which remained from June 3 to July 4. The college was occupied for a third time on August 29, 1862, as a hospital for the soldiers of Major General John Pope's army wounded at the Second Battle of Bull Run. Due to the many wounded, Holy Trinity Church was also commandeered. The campus remained a military hospital until February 2, 1863.

Early's term as president came to an end in 1865, and he was succeeded by his predecessor, Maguire, on January 1, 1866. Early then went to Boston, where he engaged in missionary work until July of that year.

== Return to Loyola College ==
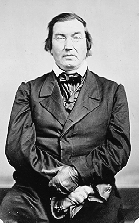
Portrait of Early

Early was once again appointed president of Loyola College in the summer of 1866, to replace Ciampi. He also again became pastor of St. Ignatius Church. The college fared well during his leadership. While there had been a pause in the conferral of degrees during the Civil War, Early saw that students completed their course of study and received degrees. The Loyola Dramatic Association, which was founded in 1865, was especially active during his term. After four years, his presidency came to an end in July 1870, when he again returned to Georgetown. He was succeeded by Edward Henchy as president of Loyola, and as pastor of St. Ignatius.

== Later years at Georgetown ==
Early returned to Georgetown as president on July 14, 1870, to replace Maguire. Following King Victor Emmanuel II's invasion of Rome, the students held a meeting to denounce the invasion as an indignity to the pope, and voted to contribute a Peter's Pence to the pontiff. The university's Law Department had been established at the end of Maguire's presidency, and it began its first classes in October 1870. The Georgetown College Journal began publishing in December 1872, as the university's first student-produced newspaper.

That year, Early began to experience the effects of a disease of his kidneys, which affected his eyesight. As a result, the vice president, Patrick Francis Healy, largely took over the administration of the university; Healy would later succeed Early as president. On May 22, 1873, Early suffered a stroke, which left him unable to speak and half his body paralyzed. He died the following day. It was estimated that 5,000 people attended his funeral, and he was buried in the Jesuit Community Cemetery at Georgetown.

Academic offices
Preceded by James A. Ryder	3rd President of the College of the Holy Cross; 1848–1851	Succeeded by Anthony F. Ciampi
New office	1st President of Loyola College in Maryland; 1852–1858	Succeeded by William Francis Clarke
Preceded by Bernard A. Maguire	26th President of Georgetown University; 1858–1865	Succeeded by Bernard A. Maguire
Preceded by Anthony F. Ciampi	5th President of Loyola College in Maryland; 1866–1870	Succeeded by Edward Henchy
Preceded by Bernard A. Maguire	28th President of Georgetown University; 1870–1873	Succeeded by Patrick F. Healy
Catholic Church titles
New office	1st Pastor of St. Ignatius Church; 1852–1858	Succeeded by William Francis Clarke
Preceded by Anthony F. Ciampi	5th Pastor of St. Ignatius Church; 1866–1870	Succeeded by Edward Henchy
