= St. Ignatius Church (Baltimore) =

Church in Baltimore, Maryland, US

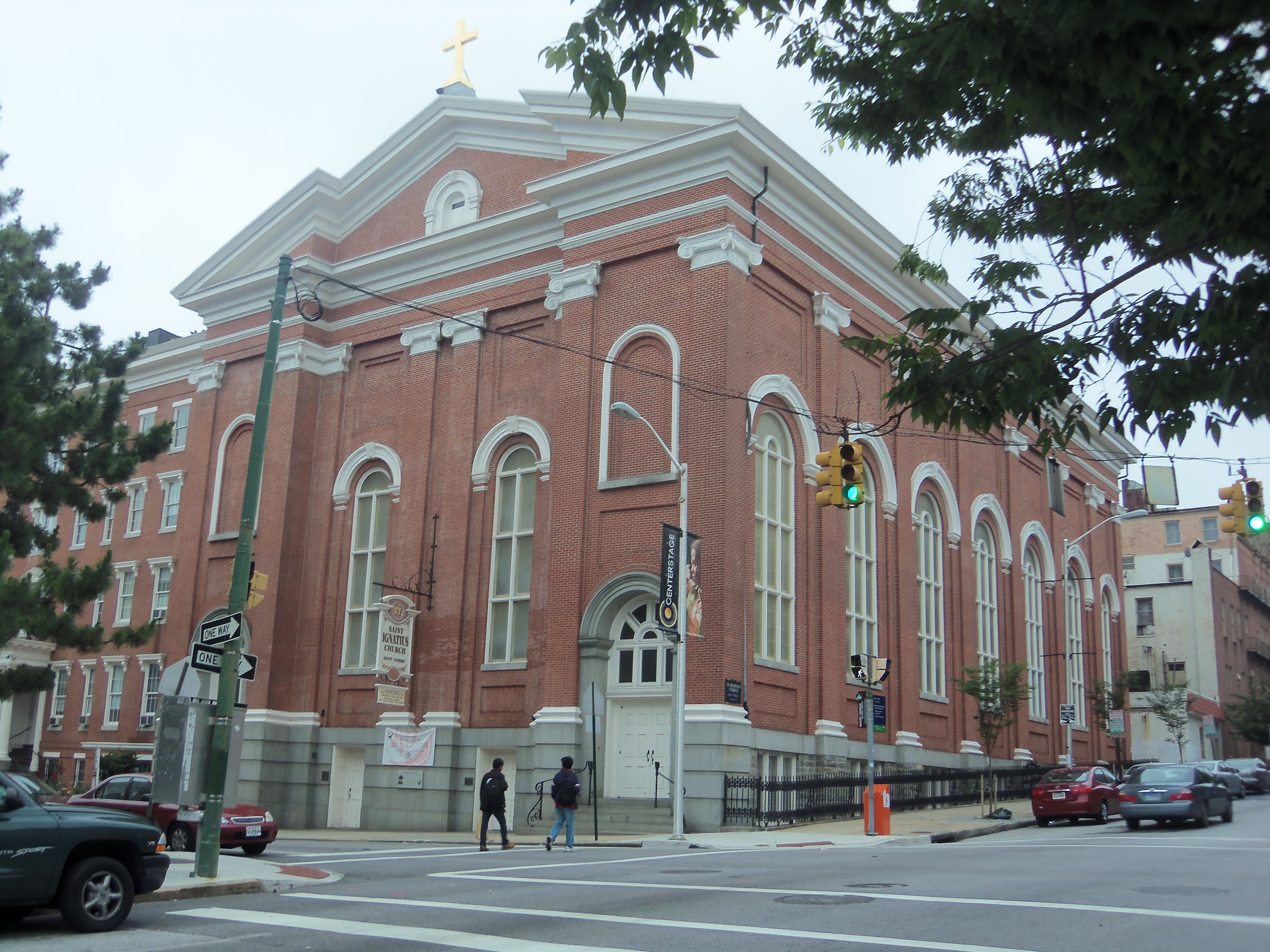

- Location in Baltimore
- 39.2985°N 76.6133°W
- Location: 740 North Calvert Street, Baltimore, MD 21202
- Country: United States
- Denomination: Roman Catholic
- Religious order: Society of Jesus
- Website: http://www.st-ignatius.net/

History
- Founder: John Early
- Consecrated: 15 August 1856

Architecture
- Years built: 1853–1856

St. Ignatius Church is a historic Catholic church in Baltimore, Maryland within the Archdiocese of Baltimore. Established and administered by the Society of Jesus, the church is dedicated to Saint Ignatius of Loyola, the order's founder. It is located at 740 N. Calvert St in the Mt. Vernon neighborhood, north of downtown Baltimore, and is considered the city’s center of history and culture.

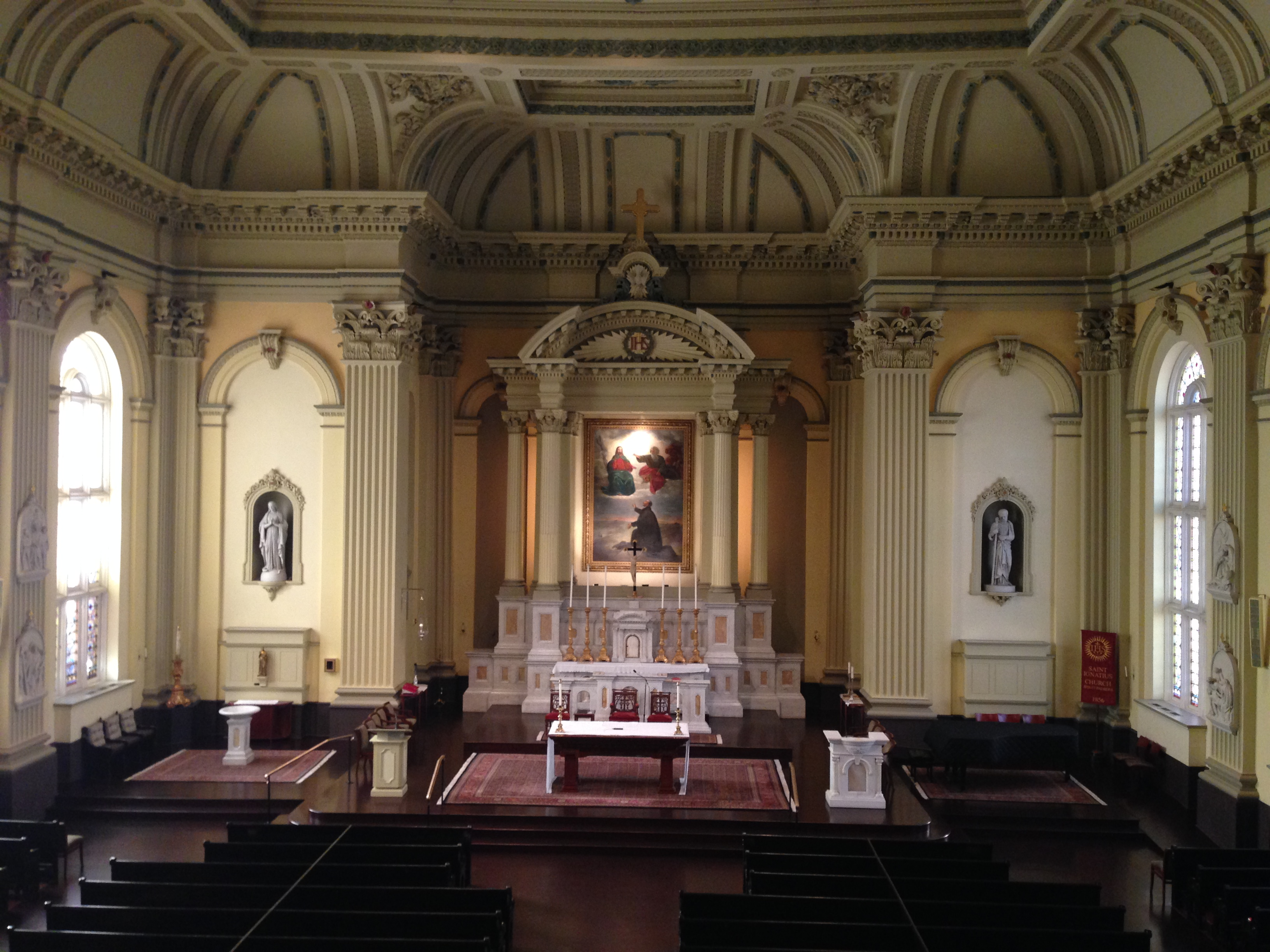
The church sanctuary

== History ==
In 1852, the new Archbishop of Baltimore, Francis Kenrick, asked the local Jesuit Provincial to open a new college in response to petitions from the newly elected, anti-Catholic Know Nothing party to ban Catholic teachings from public schools in Maryland. As a result, Loyola College opened its doors in 1852 and moved to its former location on Calvert and Madison streets in 1855. St. Ignatius Church was originally built to accompany the adjoining Loyola College, at 700 N Calvert, prior to the college’s move in 1922 to an Evergreen Campus in North Baltimore. John Early founded and served as the first pastor of the church.

The church opened on August 15, 1856 on the Feast Day of the Assumption of Mary. On 20 September 1857 the chapel of St Peter Claver was dedicated, where Masses were provided for the black population. This congregation in 1864 obtained its own parish church, St. Francis Xavier.

Major renovations were carried out in 1870, the transparent glass windows replaced with new stained glass. New pews to seat about six hundred people were added. A ceiling painting of the Assumption of Mary by Wilhelm Lamprecht was added. The following year, the newly renovated church was decorated for the public celebration of the twenty-fifth anniversary of Pius IX's election to the papacy; gaslight illuminations were installed for the occasion but could not be used because of adverse weather.

In 1968 a series of protests in support of the Catonsville Nine was held at the church.

After World War II the church had seen a sharp drop in the number of parishioners as many city residents moved to the suburbs. This led the church to “refashion their mission and ministry” in the 1990s to bring Catholics back to Mt. Vernon. In 1991, the church underwent a $1.7 million renovation to separate the sanctuary from the entrance to give parishioners a place to gather before and after mass.

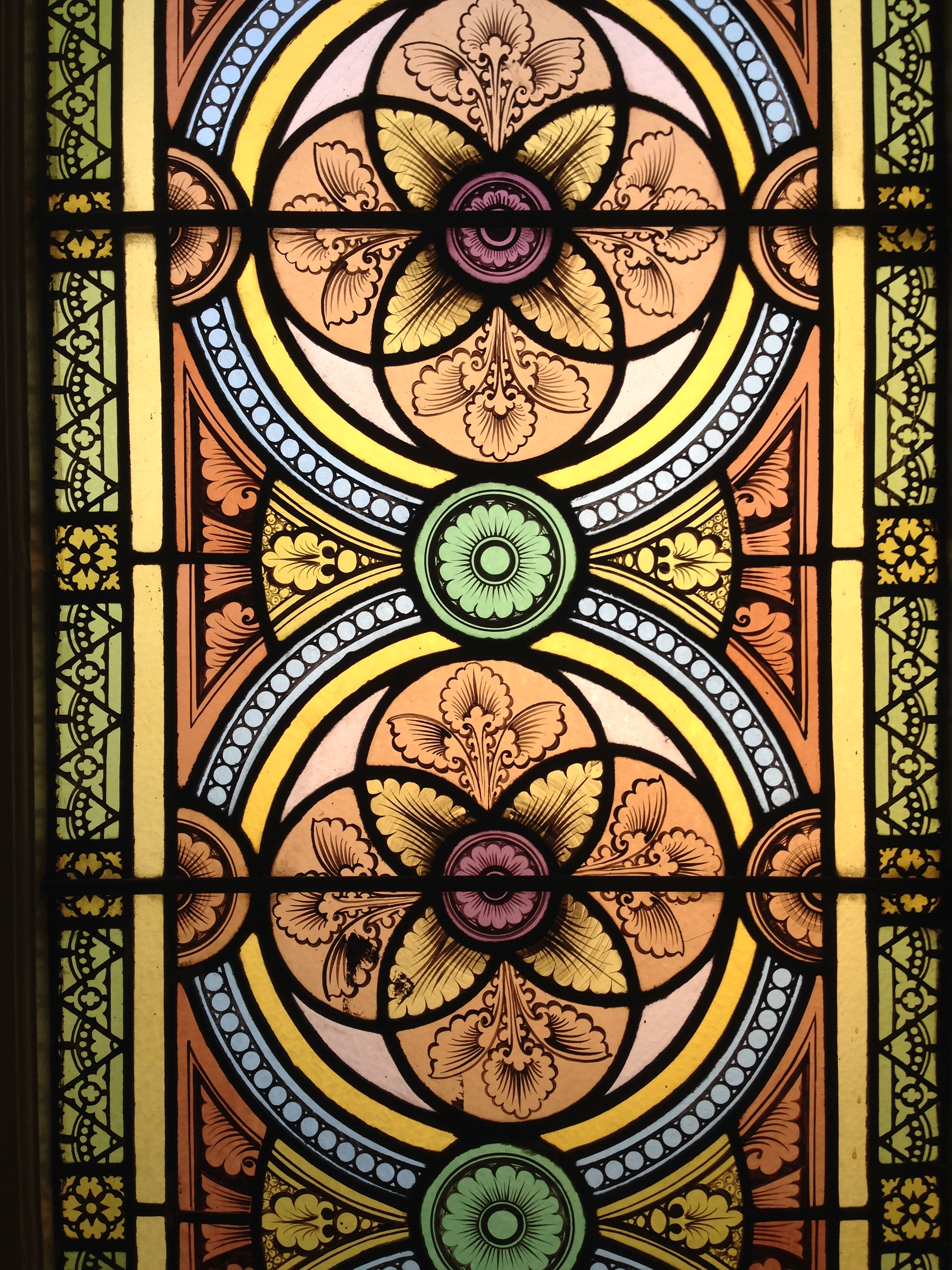
Stained Glass windows from 1870 in Saint Ignatius Church

== Architecture ==
St. Ignatius Church was built by Louis L. Long, a prominent Baltimore architect, from 1853 to 1856 with the assistance of Henry Hamilton Pittar. The building is in the Italianate style featuring Ionic columns, heavy modillioned cornicing and a broken pediment. The base of the building is rusticated while the rest of the exterior is brick with tall, frosted glass arched windows along with blank brick arches. The top of the church is adorned with a golden cross.

The interior of the church is modeled after the mother church of the Jesuits, the Church of the Gesù in Rome, taking on a similar late Renaissance/Baroque style. It features multicolored ornamental trimmings, Corinthian columns and stained glass windows of 17 different colors added during the 1870 renovation to replace the original frosted glass.

Ornate ornamental plasterwork tops Ionic columns originally painted by Italian immigrants. The plaster was restored to hues similar to those used in the mid-to-late 19th century during an extensive restoration of the church in 1999. This renovation, supervised by Michael V Murphy of Murphy & Dittenhafer Architects, cost $1.7 million and took six months. The restoration used a gradient effect on paint colors complementing the stained glass so as to draw the eye up to the ceiling.

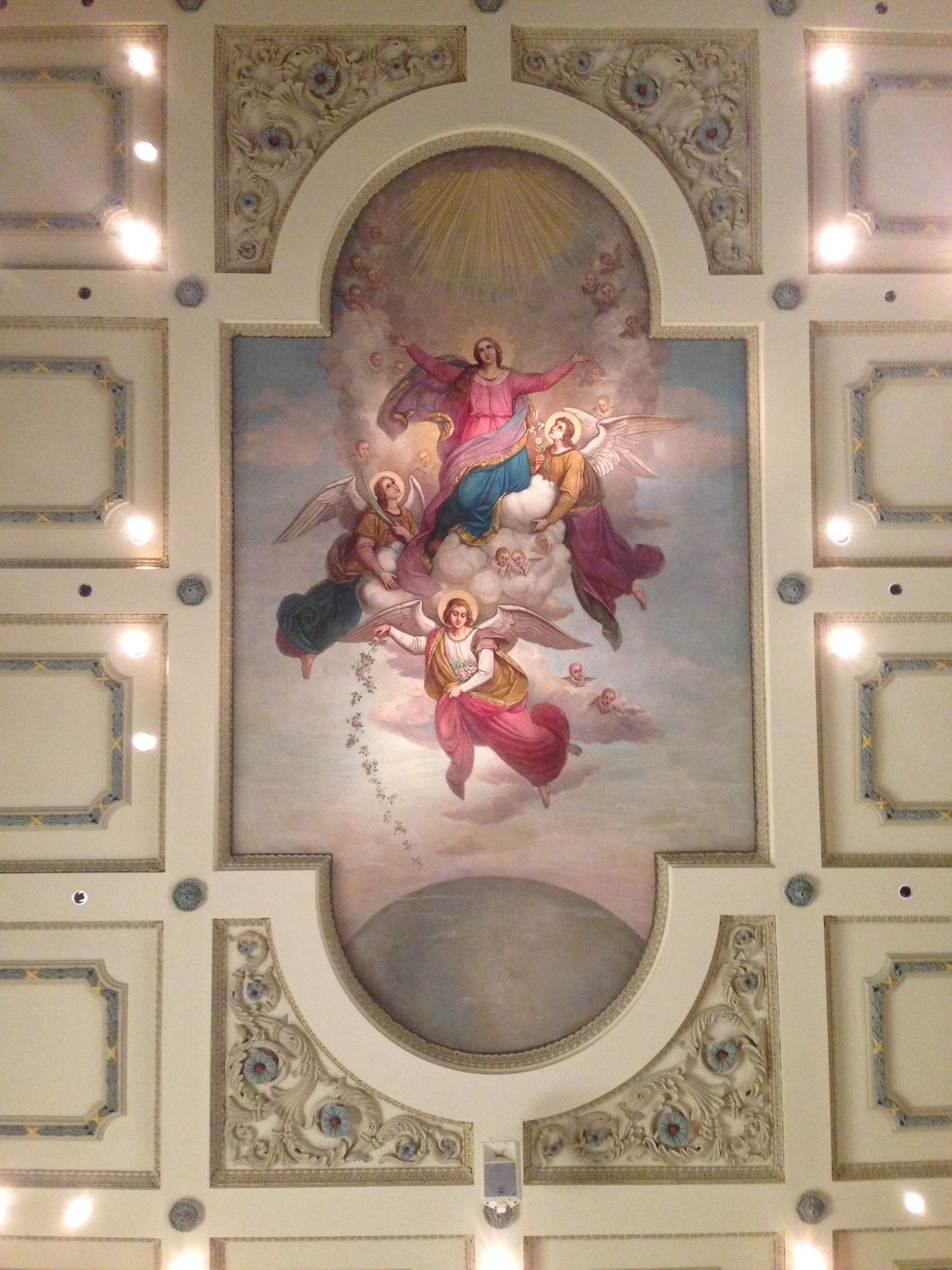
The Assumption of Mary painted by William Brecht

== Featured art ==
Saint Ignatius church has a free standing altar built by a South Baltimore company featuring hand-carved wood Ionic columns mirroring the external architecture. Behind the main altar, the church features a painting of St. Ignatius' mystical experience outside Rome at La Storta by Constantino Brumidi.

The church’s ceiling was painted by Wilhelm Lamprecht, a German artist, and depicts the Assumption of Mary. Two paintings are displayed on the wall of the church opposite the stained glass, both by a Mexican Jesuit priest. The paintings are of St. Aloysius Gonzaga, the Patron Saint of Youth, who died of the plague in 1591, and Our Lady of the Way, Madonna della Strata. On each side on the altar, there is a statue of the Blessed Virgin Mary and Saint Ignatius.

The entrance of the church contains a lifesize crucifix that was removed from the sanctuary after Vatican II.

The pipe organ was built and installed by W. B. D. Simmons, a Boston firm, in 1857 and was restored in 1987. In 2010, it underwent of full renovation, rebuild, and restoration by Patrick J. Murphy and Associates. The historic organ was played in recital during the Organ Historical Society Convention in July 2024.

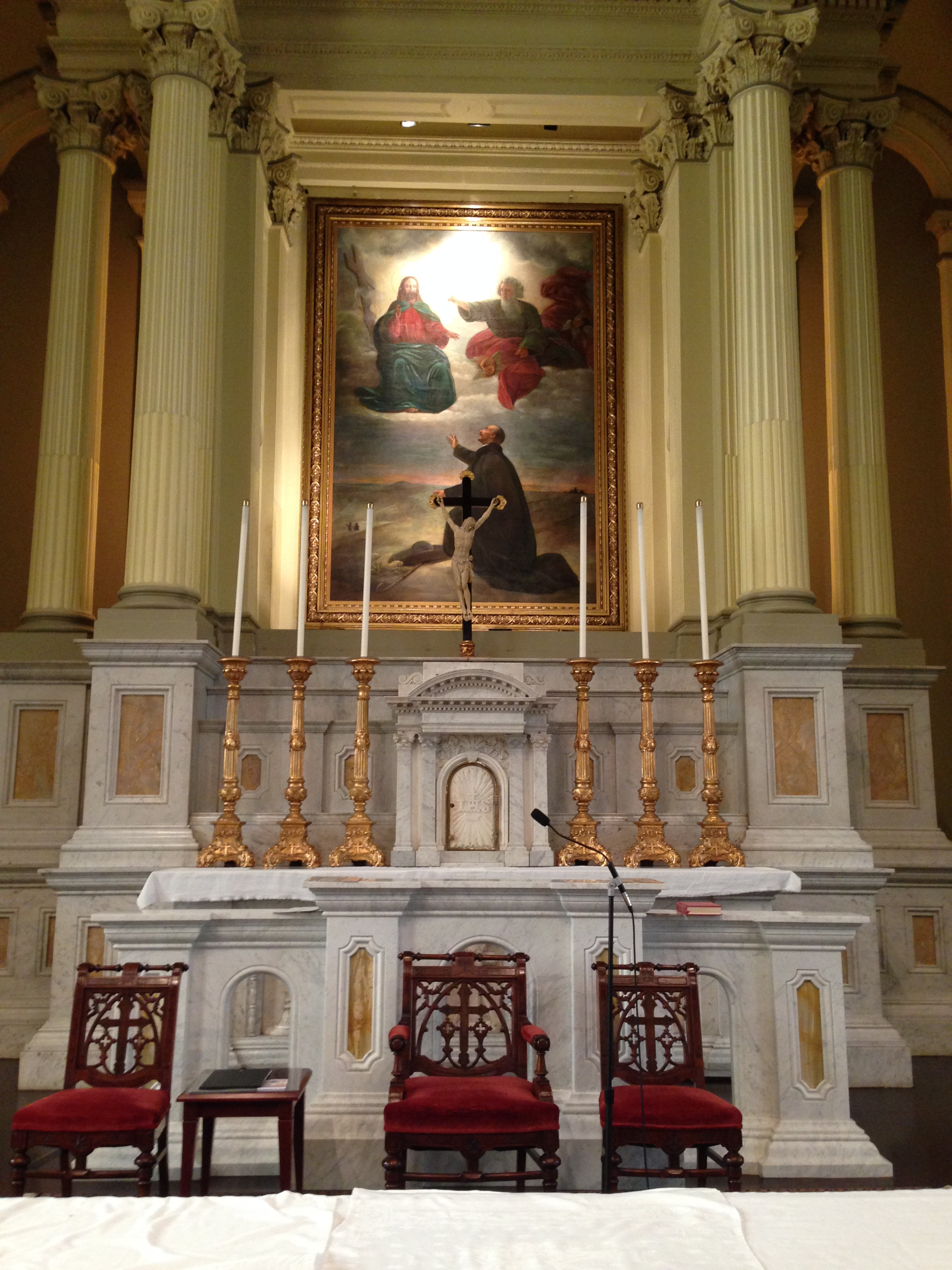
St. Ignatius’ mystical experience outside Rome at La Storta by Constantine Brumidi

== Notable pastors ==
- John Early (1852–1858)
- William Francis Clarke (1858–1859)
- Anthony F. Ciampi (1863–1866)
- John Early (1866–1870)
- Stephen A. Kelly (1870–1877)
- Edward A. McGurk (1877–1885)
- W. G. Read Mullan (1907–1908)

== See also ==
- List of Jesuit sites
