= Lawrence C. Gorman =

20th-century American Jesuit educator

The Reverend Lawrence C. Gorman SJ
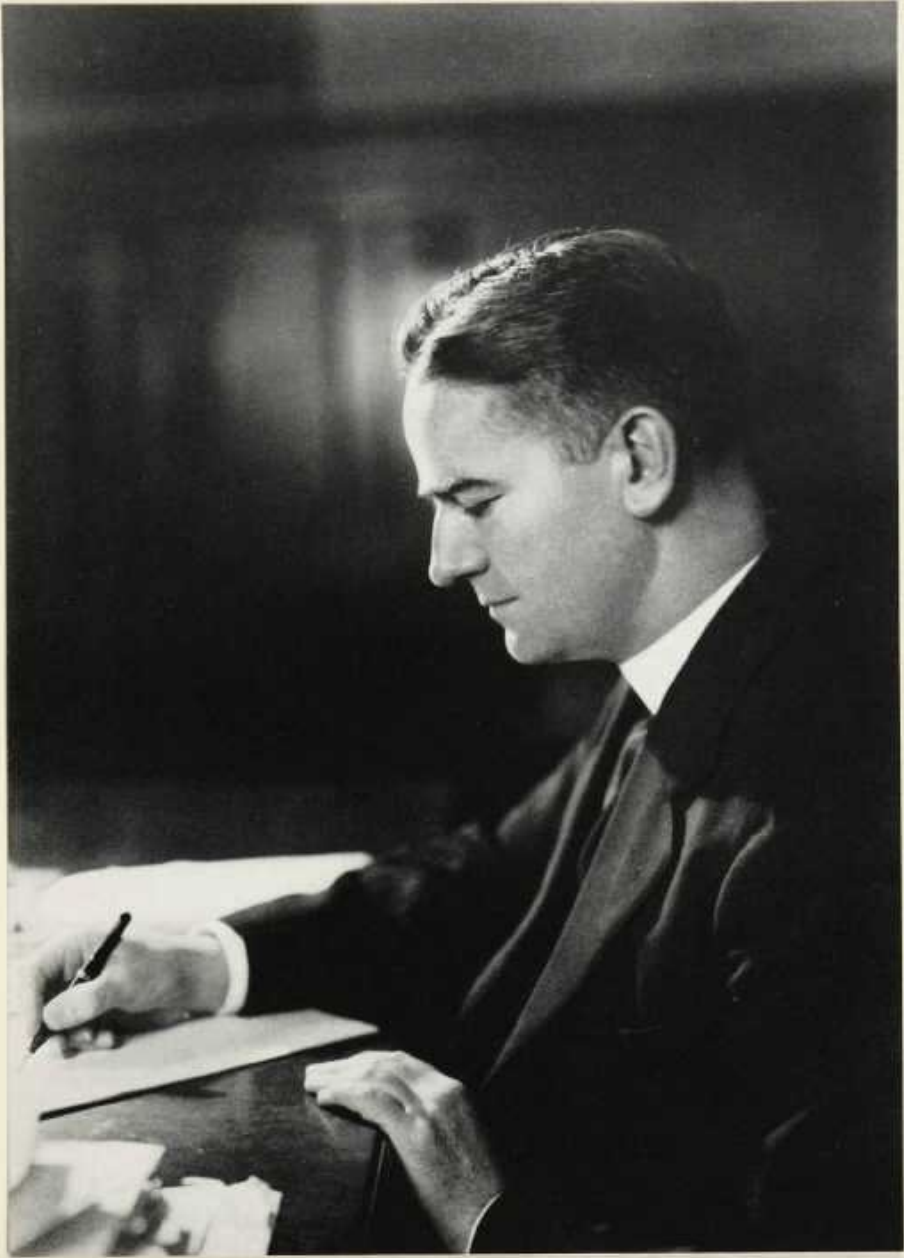
- Gorman in 1943

41st President of Georgetown University
- In office 1942–1949
- Preceded by: Arthur A. O'Leary
- Succeeded by: J. Hunter Guthrie

Personal details
- Born: September 28, 1898 New York City, United States
- Died: December 28, 1953 (aged 55) Scranton, Pennsylvania, U.S.
- Resting place: Jesuit Community Cemetery
- Education: Fordham University (A.B.); Boston College (M.A.); Woodstock College (S.T.L.); Pontifical Gregorian University (Ph.D.)

Orders
- Ordination: June 21, 1932 by Pietro Fumasoni Biondi

Lawrence Clifton Gorman SJ (September 28, 1898 – December 28, 1953) was an American Catholic priest and Jesuit who held senior positions at several Jesuit universities in the United States. Born in New York City, he was educated at Jesuit institutions, before entering the Society of Jesus. He then became a professor of chemistry at Georgetown University, and continued his higher studies at Jesuit universities in the United States and Rome.

He became the acting dean of Georgetown College in 1935, and then vice president and dean of studies at Loyola College in Maryland, before being appointed president of Georgetown University in 1942. His tenure was largely shaped by World War II, which necessitated his admittance of women into the Graduate School of Arts and Science. A proponent of racial integration, he instructed administrators to admit the first black undergraduate students. While this did not materialize until shortly after his presidency, the university did begin admitting black students in several of its graduate schools during his term. He also joined the presidents of other local universities in agreeing to allow medical students from Howard University to train at Washington, D.C.'s public hospital.

During his presidency, Gorman constructed the new Georgetown University Hospital building, and raised funds for the construction of McDonough Gymnasium. Following the end of his term of office, he became vice president and dean of studies at the University of Scranton, where he died in 1953.

== Early life and education ==
Lawrence Clifton Gorman was born on September 28, 1898, in New York City, to Lawrence P. Gorman and Anna Teresa Gorman, née Nagle. He enrolled in Xavier High School (where he was later inducted into their hall of fame) and graduated in 1916, proceeding to Fordham University, where he received his Bachelor of Arts in 1920. Upon graduation, he entered the Society of Jesus on September 28, 1920. In 1926, he was awarded a Master of Arts from Boston College.

=== Academic career ===
That year, he was appointed an assistant professor of chemistry at Georgetown University, where he remained until 1929. He then went to Woodstock College in Maryland, where in 1932, he was ordained by Archbishop Pietro Fumasoni Biondi, the Apostolic Delegate to the United States, as a subdeacon on June 19, a deacon on June 20, and a priest on June 21. He celebrated his first Solemn Mass on July 3 in St. Philip Neri's Church in The Bronx. In 1933, he was awarded a Licentiate of Sacred Theology from Woodstock. He then returned to Georgetown in 1933, where he was made director of the department of chemistry.

Replacing George F. Strohaver, Gorman was named the acting dean of Georgetown College in 1935, until a permanent replacement was found in John E. Grattan. The following year, he became the vice president and dean of studies at Loyola College in Maryland, and held this position until 1942. During this time, he also completed his education at the Pontifical Gregorian University in Rome, where he received his Doctor of Philosophy in 1938. Later in life, Gorman was eventually awarded an honorary Legum Doctor degree.

== Georgetown University ==
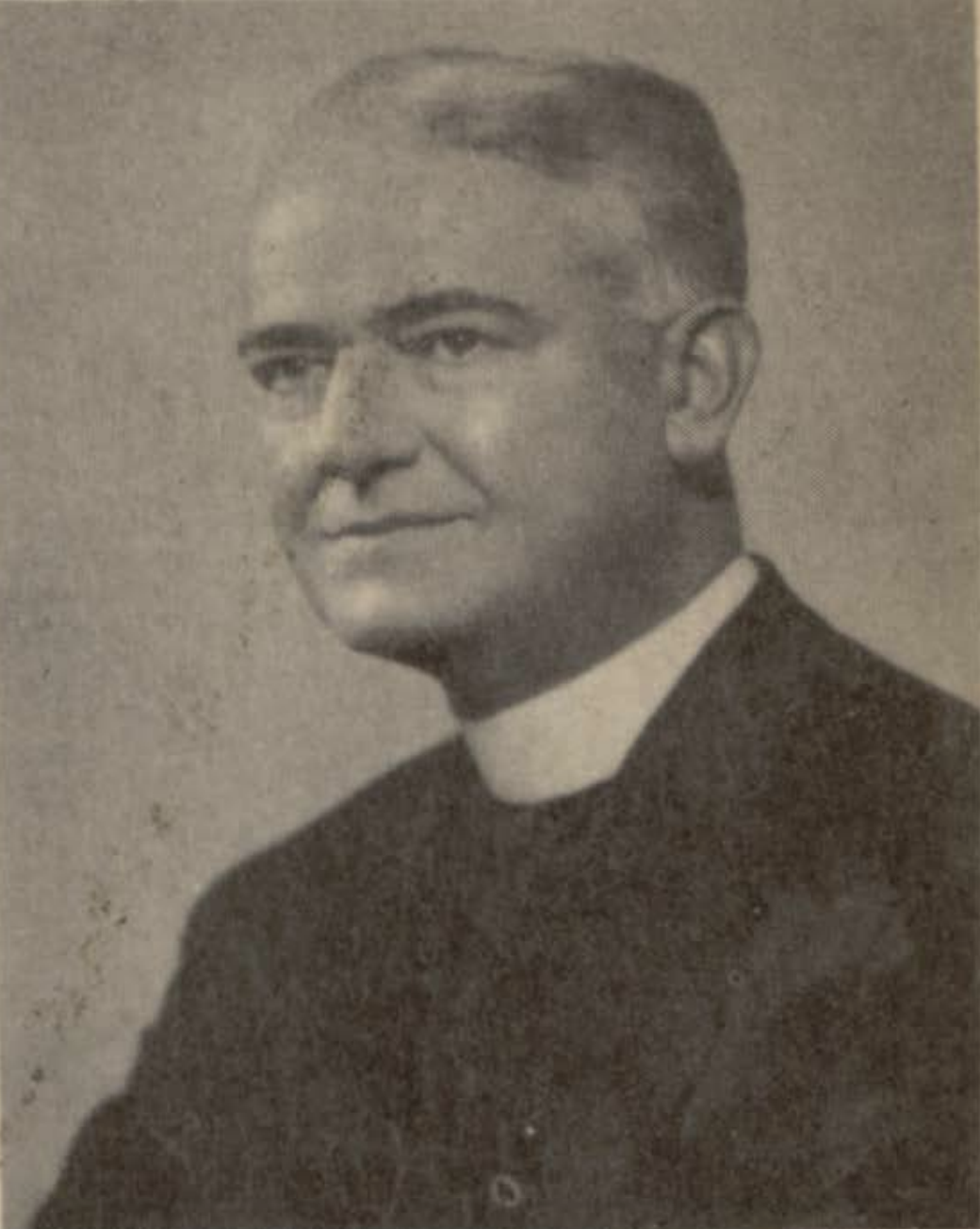
Gorman later in life

Gorman succeeded Arthur A. O'Leary as president of Georgetown University on December 17, 1942, upon being appointed by Zacheus J. Maher, the American assistant to the Jesuit Superior General. The first half of his presidency was principally shaped by World War II; since so many male students had left to fight the war, Gorman decided to admit women to the Graduate School of Arts and Sciences, with the first eleven enrolling in 1943. That year, the university also began hosting an Army Specialized Training Program, focusing on instruction in engineering, languages, and area studies, and the Medical, Dental, and Nursing Schools created training programs with the Army and Navy.

On December 18, 1944, Gorman broke ground on the new Georgetown University Hospital, which was located on Reservoir Road and held 400 beds. In order to build the hospital, on March 24, 1945, President Franklin D. Roosevelt signed a law granting a special exception to the Height of Buildings Act of 1910, which limits the height of buildings in the District of Columbia. The Georgetown University Hospital became one of seven buildings to have been specifically exempt from the height restrictions in the history of the law. In addition to construction of the hospital, Gorman undertook a campaign that raised the bulk of the funds necessary for the construction of McDonough Gymnasium, which broke ground in 1950.

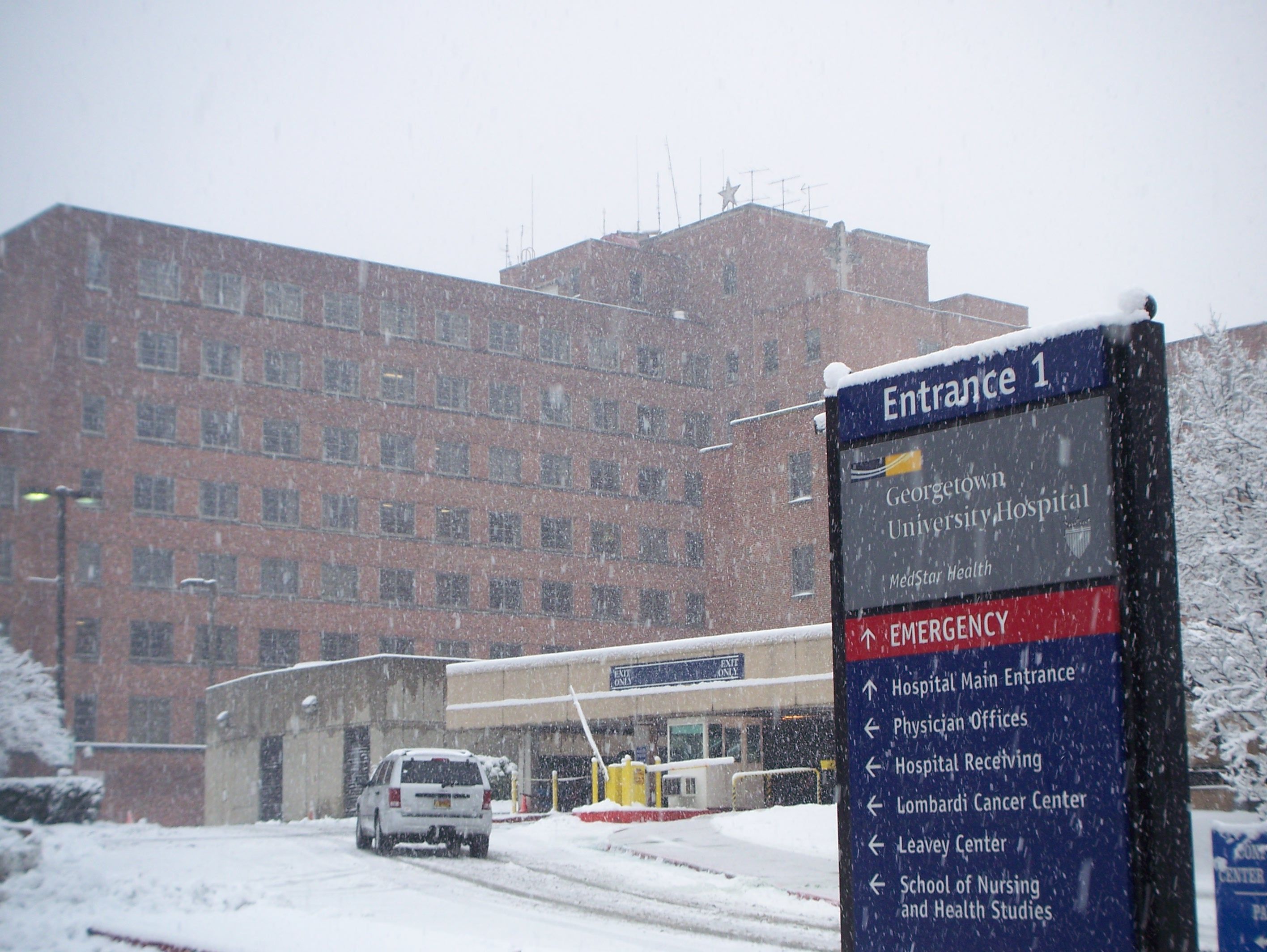
The main Georgetown University Hospital building was constructed during his presidency.

At the commencement ceremony of 1945, Gorman awarded President Harry S. Truman an honorary Doctor of Laws degree, and hailed him as the "chosen son of destiny" who was working to bring forth peace in the midst of World War II. Truman was unable to attend the ceremony, and sent Senator Dennis Chávez in his stead; an honorary doctorate was also awarded to Ross T. McIntire, the Surgeon General of the Navy. He also presented Crown Prince Abdul Ilah, the regent of the Kingdom of Iraq, with an honorary Doctor of Laws degree.

Gorman directed administrators in 1947 to include at least one black student in the following year's freshman class. The administrators did not follow this directive, but did begin to admit black students to the Graduate School, Medical School, and Law School. Eventually, in 1950, the first black undergraduate student was admitted to the School of Foreign Service.

In 1948, along with the president of Howard University, Mordecai Wyatt Johnson, and Cloyd Heck Marvin, the president of George Washington University, Gorman signed an agreement allowing students and faculty from Howard University College of Medicine to practice at Gallinger Municipal Hospital on equal footing with Georgetown and George Washington. This agreement was then ratified by the District of Columbia Board of Commissioners. Following the end of World War II, the number of students at Georgetown doubled. Gorman's presidency came to an end on February 18, 1949, and he was succeeded as president by J. Hunter Guthrie.

== Later years ==
Following the end of his presidency at Georgetown, Gorman became vice president and dean of studies at the University of Scranton in Pennsylvania, where he was also a member of the board of trustees and the board of regents. Gorman died suddenly of a heart attack on December 28, 1953, at the University of Scranton. His body was returned to Georgetown, where he was buried in the Jesuit Community Cemetery.

In 1959, Georgetown opened the Lawrence C. Gorman Diagnostic and Research Building on the Medical Center campus, which was used by medical and dental students. The building contained an outpatient dental department that doubled the number of patients the Dental School could treat.

Academic offices
Preceded by George F. Strohaver	Acting Dean of Georgetown College; 1934–1936	Succeeded by John E. Grattan
Preceded by Arthur A. O'Leary	41st President of Georgetown University; 1942–1949	Succeeded by J. Hunter Guthrie
