= Edward I. Devitt =

Canadian American Jesuit and historian

The Reverend Edward I. Devitt SJ
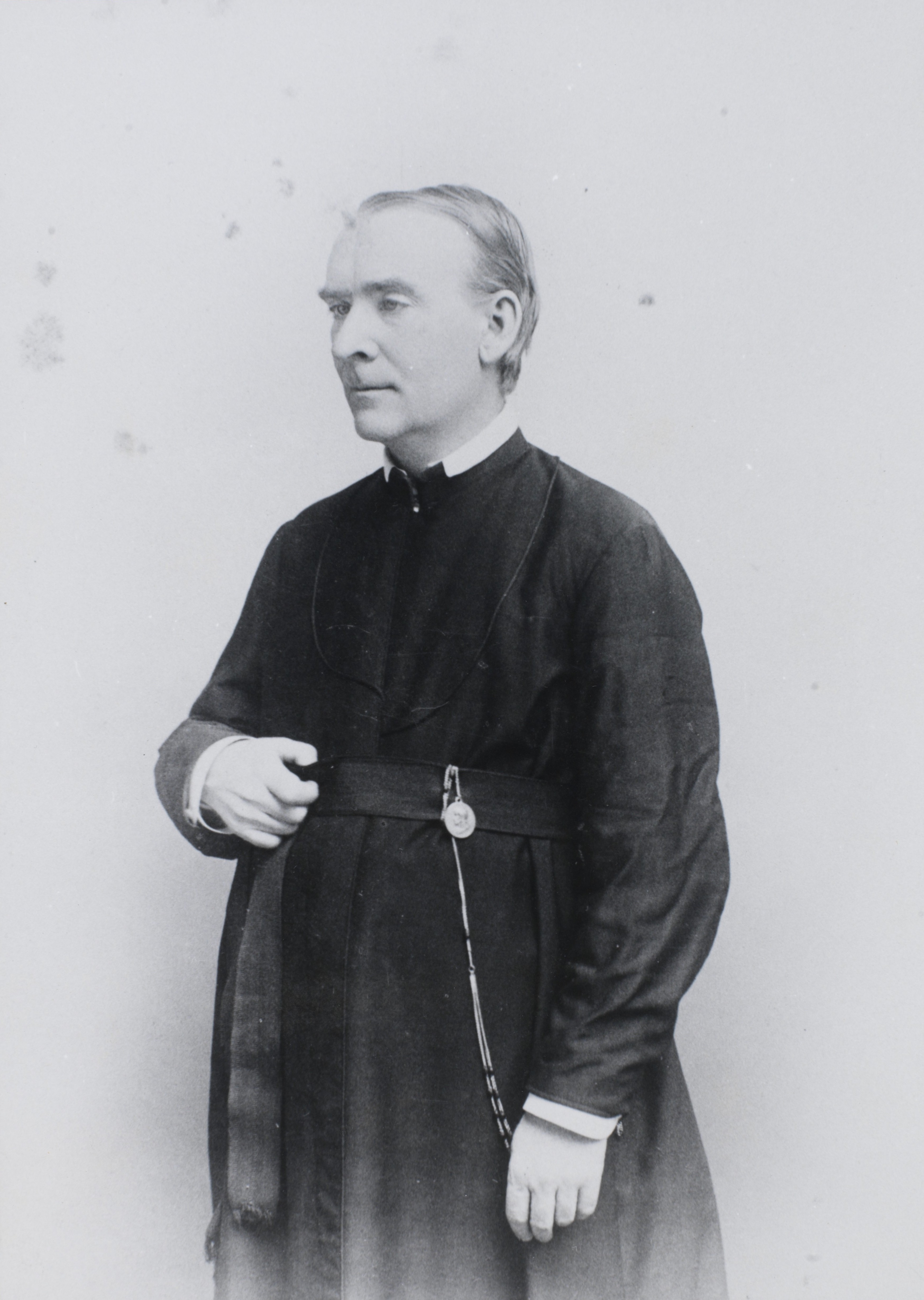
- Edward I. Devitt in 1891

9th President of Boston College
- In office 1891–1894
- Preceded by: Robert J. Fulton
- Succeeded by: Timothy Brosnahan

Personal details
- Born: November 26, 1840 Saint John, Colony of New Brunswick
- Died: January 26, 1920 (aged 79) Washington, D.C., U.S.
- Resting place: Jesuit Community Cemetery
- Education: College of the Holy Cross; Woodstock College

Orders
- Ordination: 1875 by James Roosevelt Bayley

Edward Ignatius Devitt SJ (November 26, 1840 – January 26, 1920) was a Canadian American priest, Jesuit, and historian of the American Catholic Church. Born in Saint John, New Brunswick, he moved with his family to Boston, Massachusetts, at a young age. He studied in public schools in the city before enrolling at the College of the Holy Cross. Devitt spent two years there, and then entered the Society of Jesus in 1859. He studied at the novitiate in Frederick, Maryland, and at the newly opened Woodstock College. He briefly taught at the Washington Seminary during his studies, and after graduating, was a professor for the next thirty years at Holy Cross, Woodstock, and Georgetown University.

To the surprise of many Jesuits, Devitt was appointed the vice rector of Boston College in 1891, becoming the rector and president later that year. He held the position for three years, and spent the remainder of his life teaching and working as a historian of the Catholic Church in the United States and of colonial Maryland. He died at Georgetown University in 1920.

== Early life ==
Edward Ignatius Devitt was born on November 26, 1840, in Saint John, New Brunswick, in modern-day Canada. His parents were Irish Catholics, and Devitt was baptized two days after his birth. While a young boy, he moved with his family to the United States, where they settled in the North End of Boston, Massachusetts. Devitt's father became active in the North End parish of St. Mary's, which was run by the Jesuits, under the pastorship of John McElroy. In this way, Devitt became exposed to religious life, particularly to the Jesuits.

As there were no Catholic schools in Boston at the time, Devitt was enrolled in public school, graduating from the Boston English School in 1857. He then continued his education at the College of the Holy Cross. He completed two years there before meeting Burchard Villiger, the provincial superior of the Jesuit Maryland Province, and applied for membership in the order. His application was accepted, and Devitt entered the Society of Jesus on July 28, 1859, proceeding to the novitiate in Frederick, Maryland. While at the novitiate, the American Civil War broke out, and the school was several times commandeered by the armies as a makeshift hospital, the novices and juniors being ordered to tend to the wounded.

=== Teaching and higher education ===
In 1863, Devitt moved to Washington, D.C., where he became a professor of the classics and mathematics at Washington Seminary (which later became Gonzaga College High School). He was a professor at the school at the time Abraham Lincoln was assassinated, and he marched with the Gonzaga students in the deceased president's funeral procession.

Devitt left Gonzaga in 1869 to complete his studies in philosophy and theology at Woodstock College in Maryland, where he was a member of the first class. He remained at Woodstock for seven years. He was ordained a priest by Archbishop James Roosevelt Bayley on Laetare Sunday in 1875. From 1877 to 1879, he served as prefect of studies at the College of the Holy Cross. On August 15, 1880, he professed his fourth vow.

== Academic career ==
For the next thirty years, Devitt taught philosophy at the College of the Holy Cross, Woodstock College, and Georgetown University. In teaching at Woodstock, he became the first alumnus of the college to be appointed to the faculty, and eventually became the chair of dogmatic theology. He believed that teaching was the preeminent mission of the Society of Jesus. Over the course of his career, he taught such subjects as the classics, mathematics, modern languages, philosophy, and science.

=== President of Boston College ===
While Devitt was a professor of philosophy at the College of the Holy Cross, the Jesuit provincial superior, Thomas J. Campbell, paid his annual visit to the college. On January 6, 1891, during his visit, he appointed Devitt as vice rector of Boston College, where he would assume management of the school due to the rector, Robert J. Fulton's, worsening illness. The Jesuits in both Worcester and Boston were surprised by his appointment. Eventually, on September 3, 1891, Devitt's status was changed to rector and president of Boston College by the Jesuit Superior General, Anton Anderledy. He simultaneously served as pastor of the Church of the Immaculate Conception in the South End of Boston. During Devitt's tenure, the holdings of the college library were increased by 25%, and the science department was expanded. Boston College's literary magazine, The Stylus, resumed publication in 1893, having been inactive since 1889. Devitt's tenure as president came to an end on July 16, 1894, and he was succeeded by Timothy Brosnahan.

In 1902, Devitt was selected to represent the Maryland-New York Province at the Jesuits' congregation of procurators in Rome.

=== Historian ===
Devitt also developed a reputation as an authoritative historian of the Catholic Church in the United States and of colonial Maryland. Though his historical interests began as a hobby, Devitt eventually became an editor of the Woodstock Letters, a journal published by the American Jesuits. He became a member of the Columbia Historical Society, the Maryland Historical Society, and the American Catholic Historical Society, the latter of which he was especially active in. While at Georgetown University, toward the end of his life, he received for the university's library one of the most comprehensive collections of books on the history of Maryland. Despite his reputation as an adept historian, his skills in writing were considered lackluster by many of his colleagues. He also served as the curator of Georgetown's historical archives.

Devitt died on January 26, 1920, at Georgetown University, and was buried in the Jesuit Community Cemetery. His largest project, a history of the Maryland-New York Province of the Society of Jesus, remained unfinished at the time of his death. For his historical work, Devitt received the posthumous praise of Bishop Thomas Shahan, the rector of the Catholic University of America and a historian.

Academic offices
Preceded by Robert J. Fulton	9th President of Boston College; 1891–1894	Succeeded by Timothy Brosnahan
Catholic Church titles
Preceded by Robert J. Fulton	10th Pastor of the Church of the Immaculate Conception; 1891–1894	Succeeded by Timothy Brosnahan
