= Timothy Brosnahan =

American Jesuit educator (1856–1915)

The Reverend Timothy Brosnahan SJ
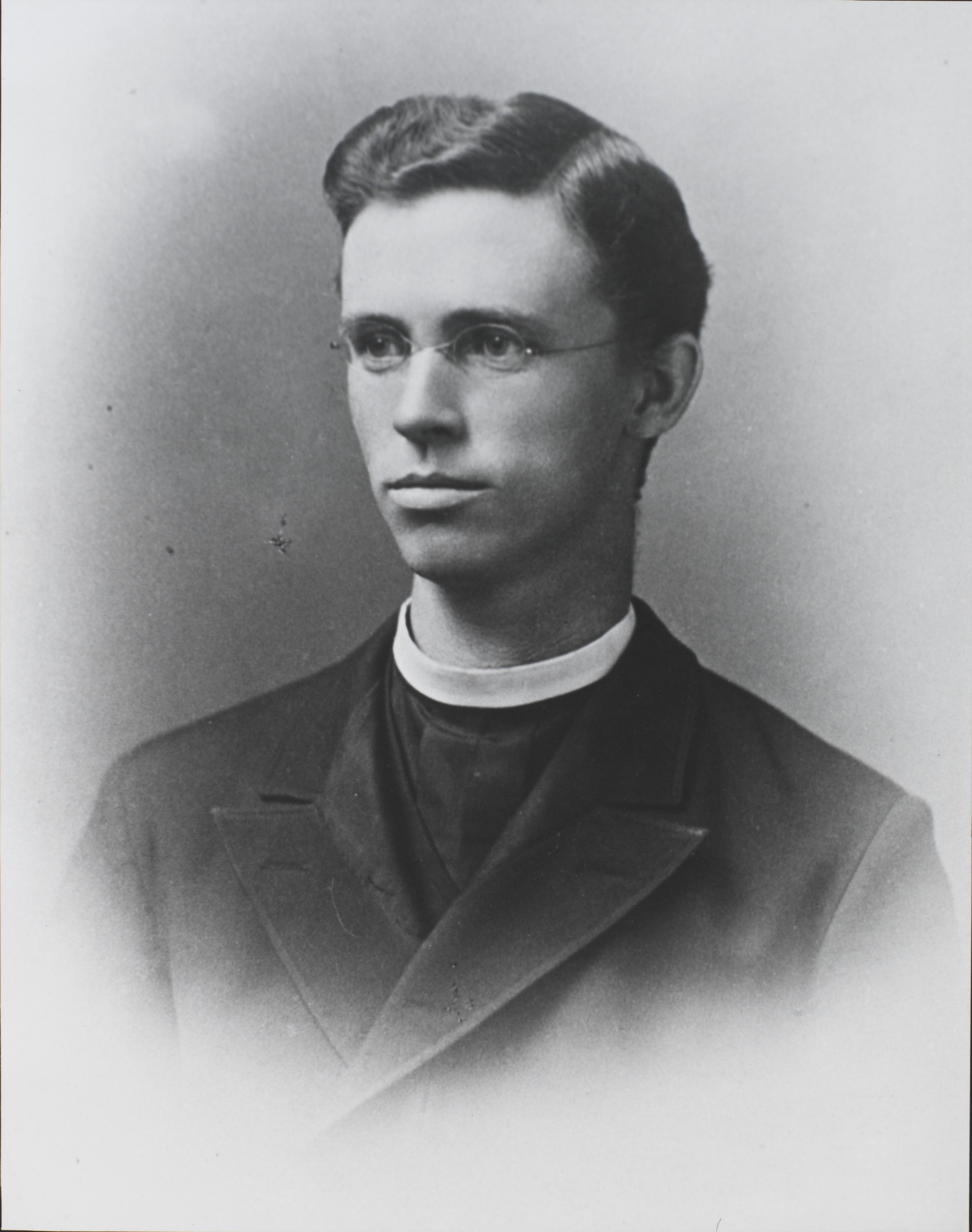
- Brosnahan c. 1896

10th President of Boston College
- In office 1894–1898
- Preceded by: Edward I. Devitt
- Succeeded by: W. G. Read Mullan

Personal details
- Born: January 8, 1856 Alexandria, Virginia, U.S.
- Died: June 4, 1915 (aged 59) Washington, D.C., U.S.
- Resting place: Jesuit Community Cemetery
- Education: Gonzaga College; Woodstock College

Orders
- Ordination: 1887 by James Gibbons

Timothy J. Brosnahan SJ (January 8, 1856 – June 4, 1915) was an American Catholic priest and Jesuit who served as the president of Boston College from 1894 to 1898. Born in Virginia, he joined the Society of Jesus in 1872, and taught philosophy at Woodstock College, Georgetown University, and Boston College. After his presidency, he wrote a prominent article criticizing an article by Harvard University's president that deprecated Jesuit education. In his later years, he taught and wrote about ethics.

== Early life ==
Timothy J. Brosnahan was born on January 8, 1856, in Alexandria, Virginia. He was baptized the following Sunday, January 15 at St. Mary's Church, a Jesuit parish. In June of that year, his father became the overseer of a farm in northern Washington County, today located in the Brightwood neighborhood of Washington, D.C., and Brosnahan moved there with his parents. In June 1861, he and his sister enrolled as students at a private school for farmers' children near his house. In November 1862, due to the outbreak of the Civil War, Brosnahan moved with his parents from the countryside to the City of Washington, and they became parishioners at St. Aloysius Church, a Jesuit parish.

In 1863, Brosnahan developed pneumonia and doctors believed he would not survive. After recovering, Brosnahan began his education, briefly attending two private schools. He then enrolled in a parochial school, initially located in the basement of St. Aloysius Church. In 1867, Brosnahan received his first communion and was confirmed by Archbishop Martin John Spalding of Baltimore. He transferred to Gonzaga College in 1869. That year, he applied to join the Society of Jesus, but the provincial superior denied his application. Brosnahan again applied to the order, and was accepted into the Jesuit novitiate in Frederick, Maryland, entering the Jesuit order on August 21, 1872.

=== Jesuit formation ===
After four years in Frederick, Brosnahan began his philosophical studies at Woodstock College. Afterwards, he taught at Boston College for four years, and in 1883, he founded the school magazine The Stylus. Later that year, he went to Georgetown University, where he taught for one year. In 1884, Brosnahan returned to Woodstock for his theological studies. During the academic year of 1886 to 1887, he was the editor of the Woodstock Letters. He was the first Jesuit scholastic to become editor of the publication. Brosnahan introduced coverage of contemporary subjects, rather than purely historical ones. He also appointed the first assistant editors. In 1887, Brosnahan completed his theological studies, and was ordained a priest that same year by Cardinal James Gibbons, the Archbishop of Baltimore.

In 1887, Brosnahan returned to Boston College as a professor of rhetoric. The following year, he completed his tertianship in Frederick. He then became a professor of logic and general metaphysics at Woodstock College. In 1892, he again returned to Boston College as a professor of philosophy, and on February 2, 1892, he professed his fourth vow. In December 1893, Brosnahan oversaw the resumption of publication of The Stylus, which had ceased publication in 1889 because renovation of the college building left it without any office.

== Boston College ==
On July 16, 1894, Brosnahan succeeded Edward I. Devitt as the president of Boston College. At the same time, he also served as the school's prefect of studies. He reorganized the schedule of English classes and wrote a summary of the Jesuit philosophy of education, both of which were adopted by other colleges through the Jesuit province. It was reproduced in Boston College's catalogue for 57 years. He also instituted a required course in physiological psychology and added a laboratory requirement to the chemistry course, and instituted geology and descriptive geometry as electives.

Brosnahan and J. Havens Richards, the president of Georgetown, organized a much-anticipated first intercollegiate debate between Boston College and Georgetown. On May 1, 1895, three students from each school debated the merits of the newly enacted federal income tax, with Georgetown prevailing.

During Brosnahan's presidency, the number of students enrolled increased to 450, from 315 in 1890, and the school's finances were in good order. In 1895 and 1896, he purchased two brick buildings on Newton Street to house the Young Men's Catholic Association, which was previously housed inside the college building. In 1898, he purchased a large tract of land in Roxbury, on both sides of Massachusetts Avenue, from the estate of Oakes Angier Ames. The college's board of trustees desired to build on it an athletic field for competitive sports. The field was only ever used for sports practice and was eventually sold in 1914, with the proceeds partly funding construction of a new college campus.

Brosnahan began for the first time a separation between Boston College's high school classes from its college classes. Each were held in separate wings of the building, with separate entrances to each. Brosnahan was succeeded as president by W. G. Read Mullan on June 30, 1898.

During his presidency of Boston College, Brosnahan was also the pastor of the Church of the Immaculate Conception in the South End. During the summer of 1895, he closed the upper church for renovations, which reopened on September 15.

== Later years ==
In 1898, Brosnahan returned to Woodstock College as a professor of metaphysics for one year, and then taught ethics. During this time, he published a book on ethics titled Adversaria ethica in ordinem redacta.

In 1900, Brosnahan wrote an article in The Sacred Heart Review responding to and criticizing an article by Charles William Eliot in The Atlantic Monthly that advocated elective classes, which Eliot had recently implemented at Harvard University as president, and criticizing the rigid curriculum in Jesuit universities, comparing it to Islamic curriculums. This article brought Brosnahan to national prominence within Catholic circles.

Brosnahan succeeded Anthony Maas as the prefect of studies of Woodstock College in 1906. In 1909, he went to Loyola College in Maryland as a professor or ethics, where he also gave evening lectures to the public. In 1914, Brosnahan's health began to deterioriate, which physicians diagnosed as Bright's disease. He paused his teaching, spending the summer at Georgetown, before returning to resume teaching in the fall. He also worked on translating his Latin book Adversaria ethica into English, which he only partially completed.

On March 1, 1915, he was taken to Georgetown University Hospital, remaining there for more than one month, and then returned to the hospital again on May 27. Brosnahan died there on June 4, 1915. His funeral was held at St. Aloysius Church, and his body was interred in the Jesuit Community Cemetery at Georgetown.

Academic offices
Preceded by Edward I. Devitt	10th President of Boston College; 1894–1898	Succeeded by W. G. Read Mullan
Catholic Church titles
Preceded by Edward I. Devitt	11th Pastor of the Church of the Immaculate Conception; 1894–1898	Succeeded by W. G. Read Mullan
