= Arthur O'Leary =

Arthur O'Leary may refer to:

- Arthur A. O'Leary (1887–1962), American Jesuit educator and president of Georgetown University
- Arthur O'Leary (preacher) (1729–1802), Irish Franciscan preacher and polemical writer
- Arthur O'Leary (composer) (1834–1919), Irish composer and pianist
- Arthur O'Leary (soldier) (1746–1773), Irish soldier in the Austro-Hungarian army
