= Georgetown University Graduate School of Arts & Sciences =

Graduate school in Washington D.C.

Georgetown University Office of Graduate Studies
- Seal of Georgetown University
- Former names: Georgetown University Graduate School of Arts & Sciences
- Type: Private
- Established: 1820; 206 years ago
- Parent institution: Georgetown University
- Affiliations: Roman Catholic (Jesuit)
- Vice President for Graduate Studies: Alison Mackey
- Location: Washington, D.C., United States; 38°54′19″N 77°04′11″W
- Campus: Urban
- Website: grad.georgetown.edu

The Graduate School of Arts & Sciences is a graduate school at Georgetown University in Washington, D.C. Its offices are in the historic Car Barn building on the edge of the campus in the Georgetown section of Washington, D.C.

== History ==
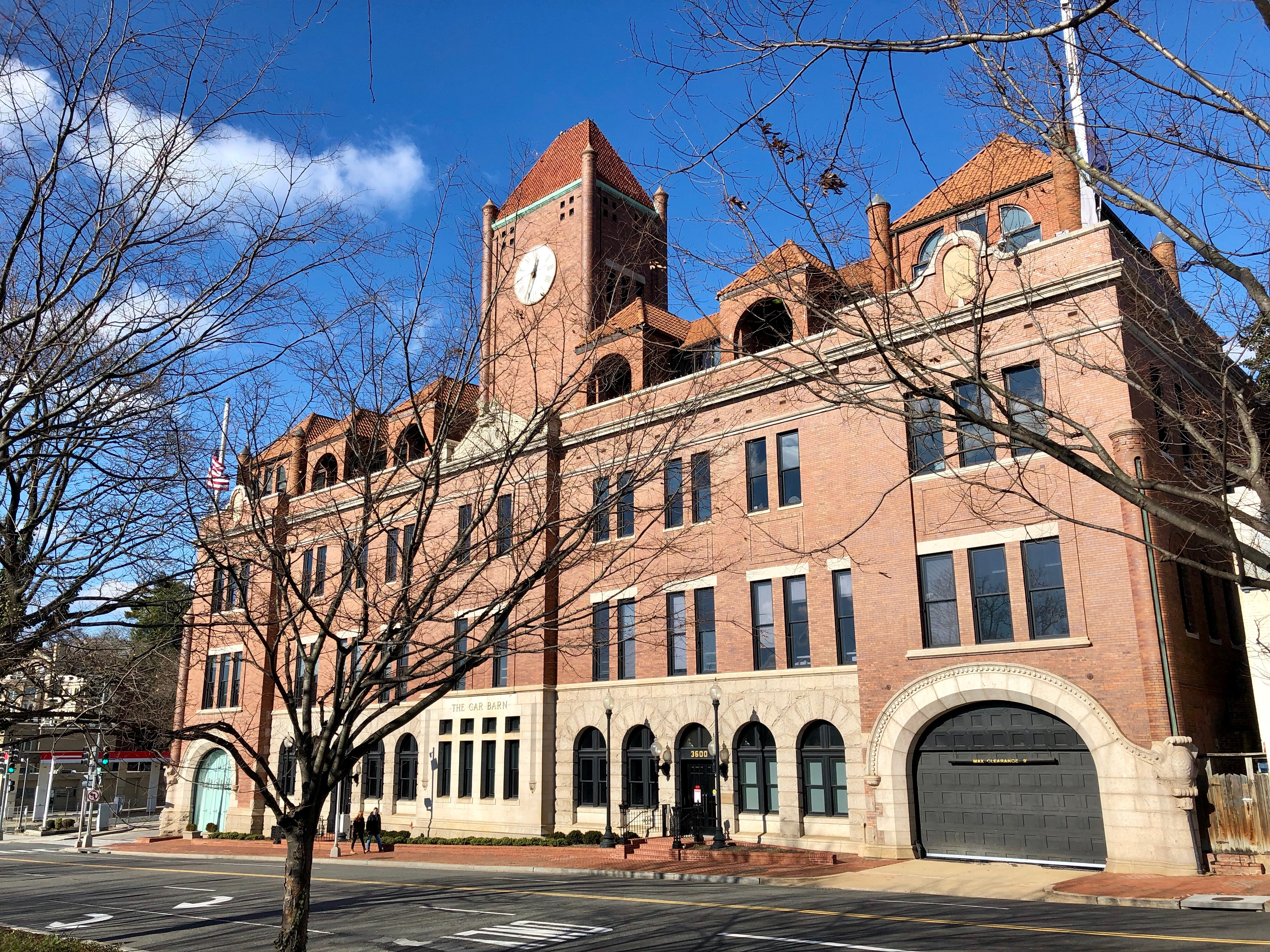
The Graduate School is currently housed within the historic Georgetown Car Barn

The graduate program was first founded in 1820, when Georgetown College graduates expressed the desire for continued studies. The school offered its first graduate degree in 1821. The school existed independently from 1855 until the end of the American Civil War, when low student numbers forced its suspension. The school was reestablished in 1891, conferring its first doctoral degree in 1897.

== Programs ==
The school is currently the largest graduate school at Georgetown and offers 46 programs in 34 departments.

== List of deans ==
Deans
No.	Name	Years	Notes	Ref.
1	Henry J. Shandelle SJ	1900–1906		
2	Charles Macksey SJ	1906–1907		
3	Thomas I. Gasson SJ	1914–1923		
4	John H. Fasy SJ	1923–1925		
5	Louis J. Gallagher SJ	1925–1926		
6	Robert A. Parsons SJ	1926–1927		
7	Arthur A. O'Leary SJ	1927–1928		
8	R. Rush Rankin SJ	1928–1931		
9	John J. McLaughlin SJ	1931–1932		
10	Miles J. O'Mailia SJ	1932–1934		
11	Frederick W. Sohon SJ	1934–1936		
12	Aloysius J. Hogan SJ	1936–1938		
13	Wilfrid Parsons SJ	1938–1940		
14	Edward C. Phillips SJ	1940–1942		
15	J. Hunter Guthrie SJ	1942–1949		
16	Gerard Yates SJ	1949–1955		
17	John M. Daley SJ	1955–1960		
18	James B. Horigan SJ	1960–1967		
19	Rocco E. Porreco	1967–1973		
20	Donald G. Herzberg	1973–1981		
21	Richard B. Schwartz	1981–1998		
22	Joseph Serene	1998–2001		
23	David W. Lightfoot	2001–2006		
24	Timothy A. Barbari	2006–2011		
25	Gerald Mara	2011–2013	Acting dean	
26	Norberto M. Grzywacz	2014–2019		
27	Alexander Sens	2020–2025		

With the transition from the Graduate School of Arts & Sciences to the Office of Graduate Studies, the role of Dean was replaced with that of Vice President for Graduate Studies.

No.	Name	Years	Notes	Ref.
1	Alexander Sens	2025-2026	Interim	
2	Alison Mackey	2026-present		
