= Wolfgang Fink =

German-American theoretical physicist

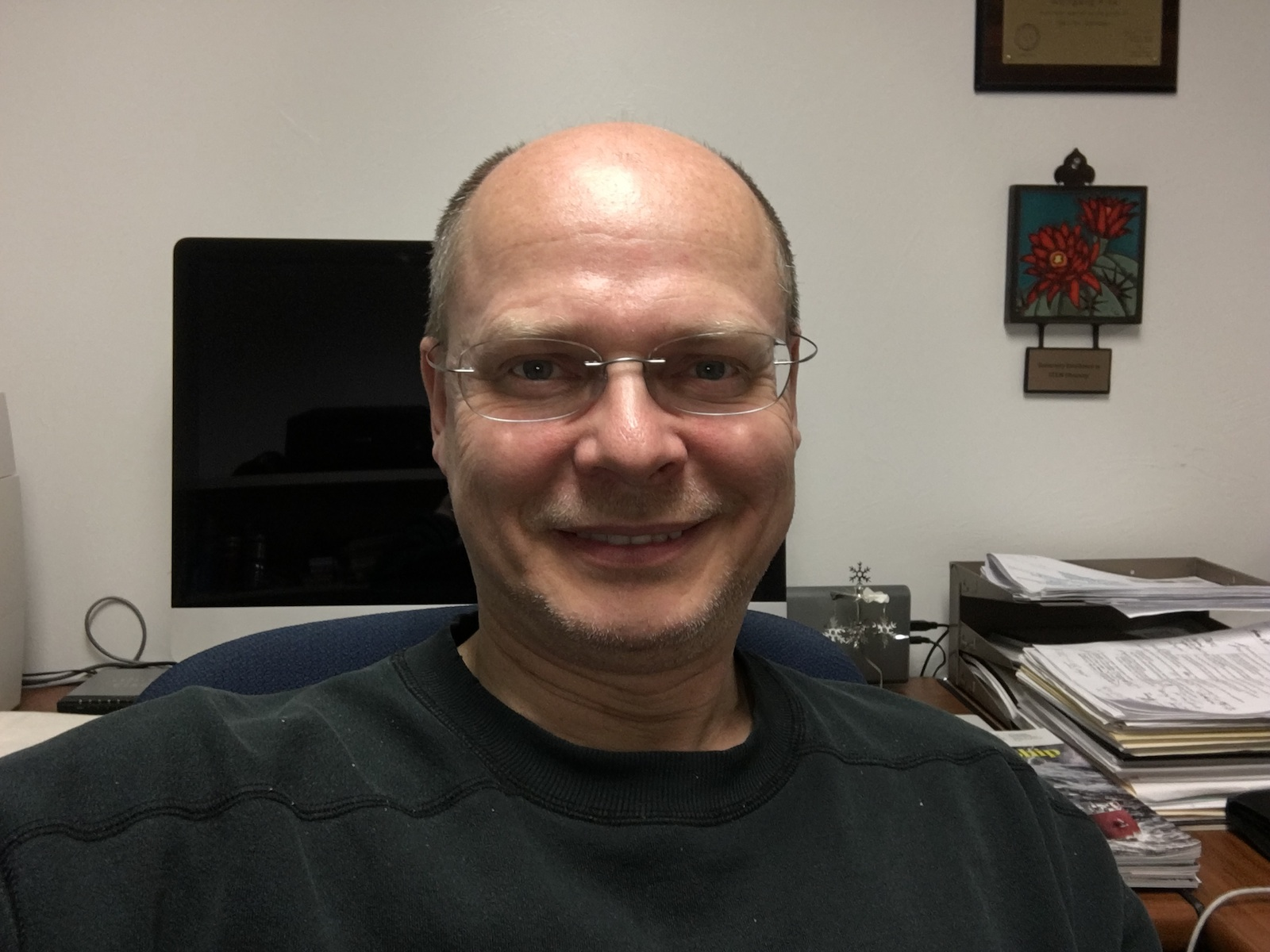
- Fink in February 2017
- Born: Limburg an der Lahn, Germany
- Education: University of Tübingen (Ph.D. 1997); University of Göttingen (B.S. 1990, M.S. 1993)
- Awards: NAI Fellow (2023); SPIE Meinel Award (2023); USDOE/NREL E-ROBOT Prize 2021; ARVO Silver Fellow (2023); SPIE Fellow (2020); PHMS Fellow (2018); Aimbe Fellow (2012); IEEE Senior Member (2015) da Vinci Fellow University of Arizona (2015); ACABI Fellow University of Arizona (2017)
- Scientific career
- Fields: Autonomous systems Biomedical engineering Brain–computer interface C4ISR systems Smart systems Stochastic optimization Telemedicine; Tier-scalable reconnaissance Vision science
- Workplaces: University of Arizona, California Institute of Technology, NASA's Jet Propulsion Laboratory, University of Southern California

Wolfgang Fink is a German-American theoretical physicist. He is currently an associate professor and the inaugural Maria & Edward Keonjian Endowed Chair of Microelectronics at the University of Arizona. Fink has joint appointments in the Departments of Electrical & Computer Engineering, Biomedical Engineering, Systems & Industrial Engineering, Aerospace & Mechanical Engineering, and Ophthalmology & Vision Science at the University of Arizona. He is the current Vice President of the Prognostics and Health Management (PHM) Society.

== Research career & education ==
Fink has a B.S. (Vordiplom, 1990) and M.S. (Diplom 1993) degrees in physics and physical chemistry from the University of Göttingen, Germany, and a Ph.D. "summa cum laude" in theoretical physics from the University of Tübingen, Germany (1997). He was a senior researcher at NASA's Jet Propulsion Laboratory (2001–2009). He was also a visiting associate in physics at the California Institute of Technology (2001–2016), where he founded Caltech's Visual and Autonomous Exploration Systems Research Laboratory. He also held concurrent appointments as Voluntary Research Associate Professor of both Ophthalmology and Neurological Surgery at the University of Southern California (2005–2014).

== Active research areas ==
Fink is a specialist in the areas of autonomous systems, biomedical engineering for healthcare, human/brain-machine interfaces, and smart service systems. In particular, his research focuses on autonomous robotic systems for hazardous environments, C^{4}ISR architectures (Tier-Scalable Reconnaissance), vision prostheses for the blind, smart mobile and tele-ophthalmic platforms, ophthalmic instruments and tests, self-adapting wearable sensors, cognitive/reasoning systems, and computer-optimized design.

Fink was a principal investigator of the United States Department of Energy's (USDOE's) "Artificial Retina" project (2004–2011), a multi-institutional and multi-disciplinary CRADA-based effort to develop an implantable microelectronic retinal device that restores useful vision to people blinded by retinal diseases (Retinitis pigmentosa and Macular degeneration). Furthermore, Fink is Caltech's founding Co-Investigator of the NSF-funded Center for Biomimetic Microelectronic Systems (2003–2010), awarded in 2003 to University of Southern California, Caltech, and UC Santa Cruz. The center enacted the only FDA-approved visual prosthesis to date (Argus retinal prosthesis or ARGUS II).

== Honors & awards ==
- Fellow of the National Academy of Inventors (NAI), Class of 2023 for having "demonstrated a highly prolific spirit of innovation in creating or facilitating outstanding inventions that have made a tangible impact on the quality of life, economic development, and welfare of society".
- Recipient of the 2023 SPIE Aden and Marjorie Meinel Technology Achievement Award "for pioneering, sustained contributions to the development of transformational opto-medical examination and device technologies, with particular focus on visual prostheses for the blind, ophthalmology, and tele-ophthalmology."
- Co-winner of USDOE/NREL-sponsored E-ROBOT Prize 2021 (Phase 1: $200,000), an American-Made Challenge, to devise building envelope retrofit solutions that make retrofits easier, faster, safer and more accessible for workers. The team "wall-EIFS" co-led by Fink devised "wall-EIFS: a robotically applied, 3D-sprayable exterior insulation and finish system (EIFS) for building envelope retrofits."
- Recipient of the inaugural Scott Clements Most Valuable Person (MVP) Award of the Prognostics and Health Management (PHM) Society (2020).
- ARVO Fellow, Class of 2023.
- Fellow of SPIE (inducted in 2020) "for achievements in vision science for the blind and tele-ophthalmic healthcare worldwide".
- Fellow of the Prognostics and Health Management (PHM) Society (inducted in 2018).
- ACABI Fellow 2017 recognizing "faculty that are strongly active in innovation related to ACABI", the Arizona Center for Accelerated BioMedical Innovation at the University of Arizona.
- da Vinci Fellow 2015 for "innovative, productive and highly recognized engineering research" at the University of Arizona.
- Senior Member IEEE
- College of Fellows of the American Institute for Medical and Biological Engineering (AIMBE) (inducted in 2012) "for outstanding contributions in the field of ophthalmology and vision sciences with particular focus on diagnostics and artificial vision systems".

== Patents ==
Fink has been awarded 31 US and international patents to date in the areas of autonomous systems, biomedical devices, neural stimulation, MEMS fabrication, data fusion and analysis, and multi-dimensional optimization.
