= Joseph Guthrie =

Joseph Guthrie may refer to:

- J. Hunter Guthrie (1901–1974), American academic philosopher, writer, Jesuit, and Catholic priest
- Joseph Guthrie (politician) (born 1929), member of the New Hampshire House of Representatives
