= Alexander Sens =

American professor of classics

- Occupations: Markos and Eleni Tsakopoulos-Kounalakis Professor of Hellenic Studies, Georgetown University

Academic background
- Education: Harvard University (PhD) and (MA), classical philology Brown University (BA), classics and Sanskrit

Alexander Sens is an American professor of classics at Georgetown University, where he is the Markos and Eleni Tsakopoulos-Kounalakis Chair of Hellenic Studies. Sens is a specialist in post-classical literature, especially epigram. His research has revealed the literary merit of often-neglected authors such as Matro of Pitane and Lycophron.

== Early life and education ==
He was born in Boston, Massachusetts on 28 September 1964. He has one brother. He attended public elementary and high school in Brookline, Massachusetts. He earned a B.A. at Brown University in 1986, and an MA (1988) and PhD (1991) at Harvard University.

== Academic career ==
Prior to his current post he was the Joseph Durkin SJ Professor of Classics, a chair named for a noted Georgetown historian. Sens recently served first as Interim Dean and then Dean of the Graduate School of Arts and Sciences from 2020-2026, following Norberto M. Grzywacz. Sens was also the interim vice president for graduate studies from 2025-26. Under his leadership Georgetown completed a four-year process of reforming its structures for graduate education, making Sens the last dean of the old structure.
