= Georgetown University Jesuit Community Cemetery =

Historic cemetery at Georgetown University, Washington, DC

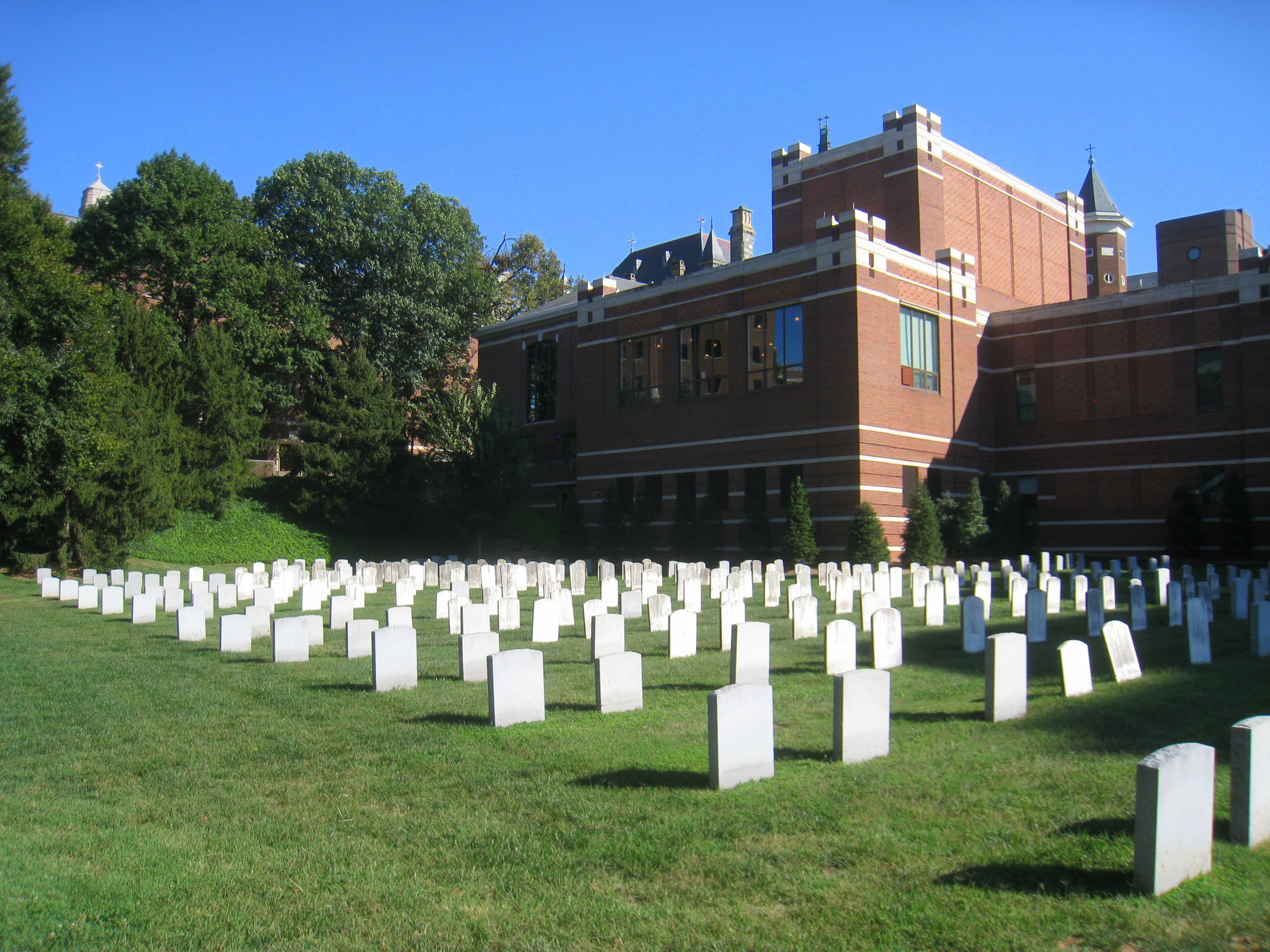
- Cemetery in 2010
- Interactive map of Georgetown University Jesuit Community Cemetery

Details
- Established: 1808 (1854 in present location)
- Location: Georgetown University, Washington, D.C.
- Coordinates: 38°54′30″N 77°04′25″W
- Type: Roman Catholic
- Size: 1 acre (0.40 hectares)
- No. of graves: 350 (as of 2009)
- Find a Grave: Georgetown University Jesuit Community Cemetery

The Jesuit Community Cemetery on the campus of Georgetown University in Washington, D.C., is the final resting place for Jesuits who were affiliated with the university. It was first established in 1808 and was moved to its present location in 1854.

== History ==
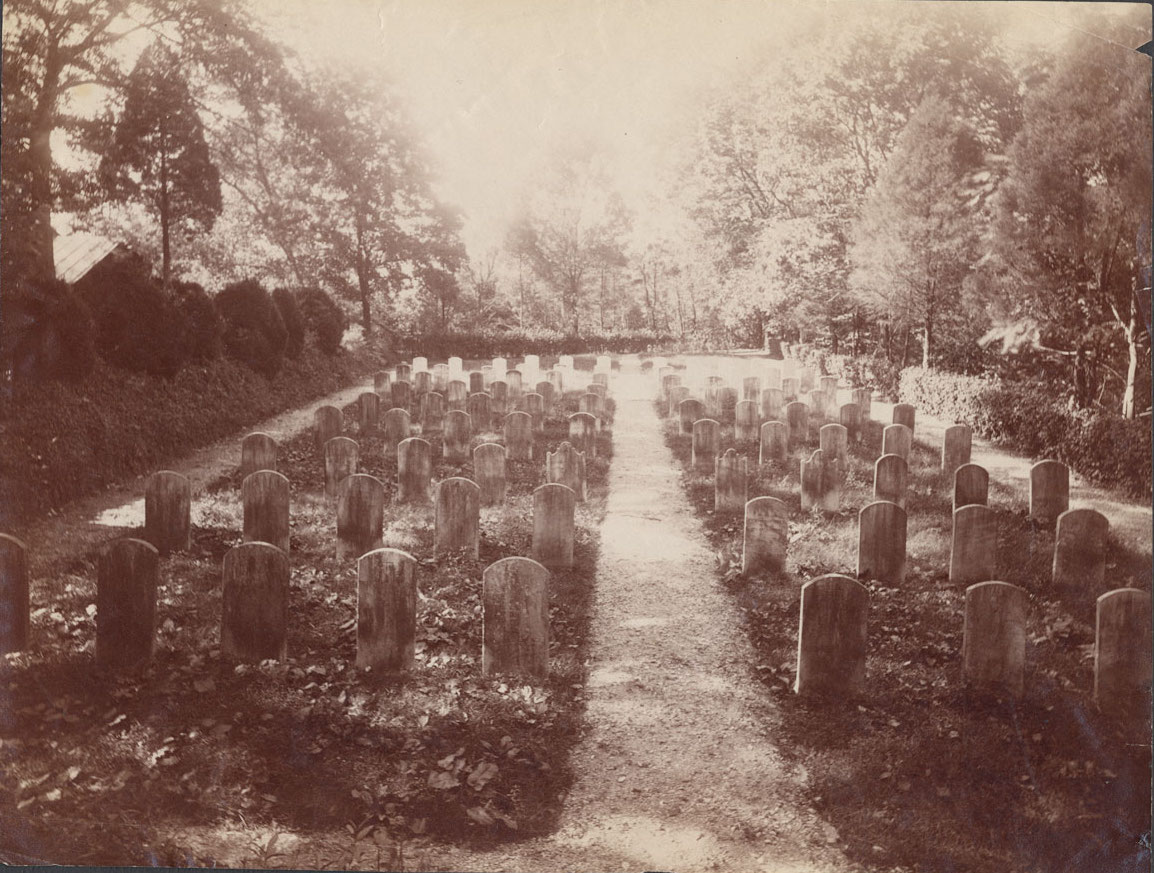
Original cemetery location, next to Maguire Hall

The Jesuit cemetery was originally established in 1808 at the southern end of Healy Hall. The first person buried there was Thomas Kelly, S.J. on August 16, 1808. With the construction of Maguire Hall, university administrators ordered the cemetery to be moved to its present location in 1854, so that it would not be immediately next to the hall. This required the exhumation and relocation of the remains of 46 Jesuits. In 1964, a senior administrator proposed to university president Edward B. Bunn the idea of exhuming the bodies once again and removing them to the cemetery at Woodstock College in Maryland, as doing so would free up approximately one acre of land on the campus that could be used for building.

Today, the cemetery is situated in the middle of Georgetown's campus, between the Edward B. Bunn S.J. Intercultural Center and Harbin Hall. As of 2009, the cemetery is the resting place for 350 Jesuits, 17 of whom served as president of Georgetown University. It is the oldest of the cemeteries owned by the university. As with other Jesuit cemeteries around the world, all of the headstones are uniform. Many of the headstones are marked in Latin with coadjutor to indicate that the decedent was a Jesuit brother, or sacerdos to indicate that the decedent was a priest or scholastic (Jesuit priest in training).

== Notable interments ==
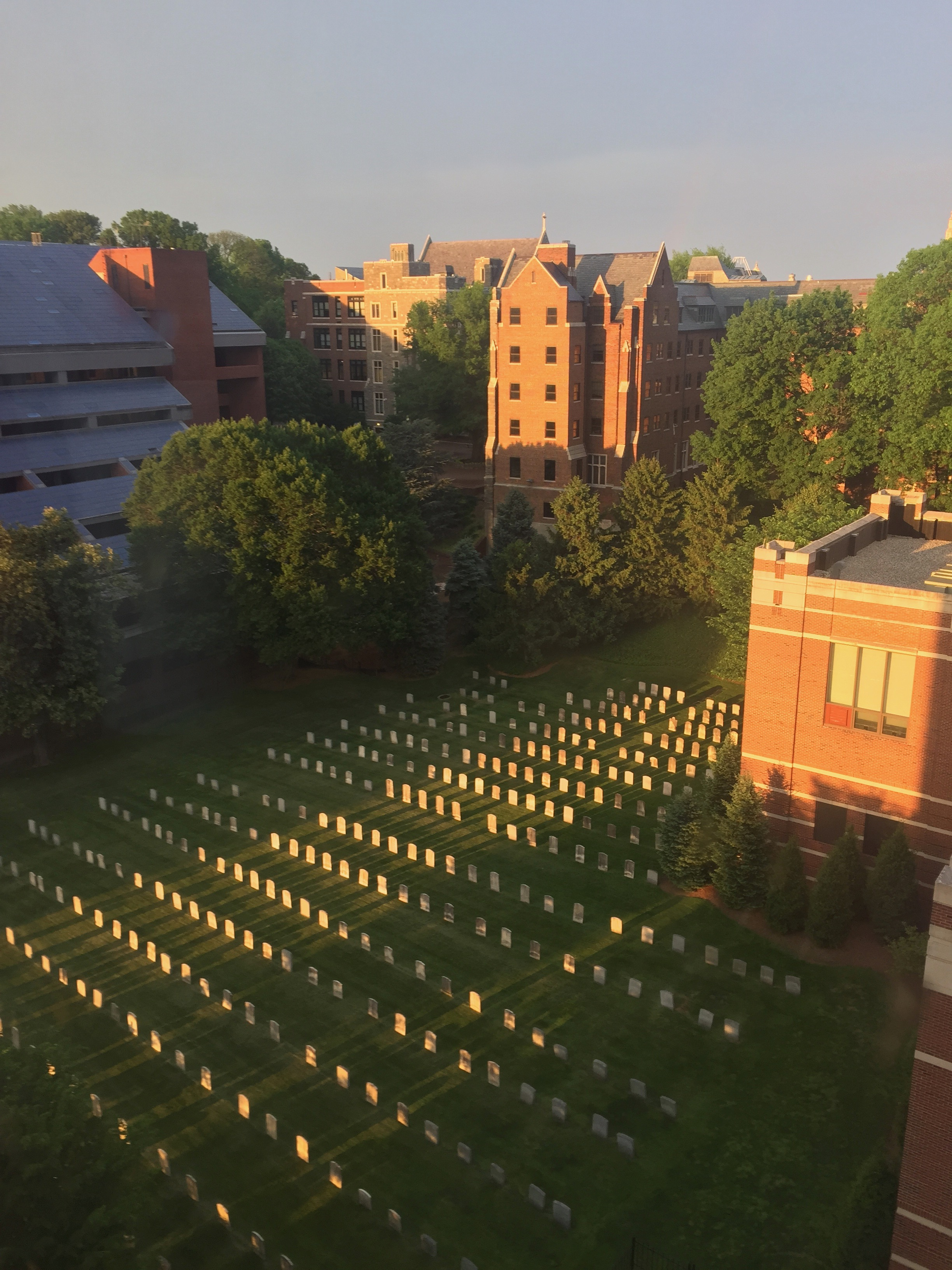
Overhead view of the cemetery

Among the notable burials are:

- Robert W. Brady
- Timothy Brosnahan
- Edward B. Bunn
- Gerard Campbell
- Anthony F. Ciampi
- William Francis Clarke
- Edward I. Devitt
- James A. Doonan
- John Early
- Enoch Fenwick
- Lawrence C. Gorman
- J. Hunter Guthrie
- Patrick Francis Healy
- Timothy S. Healy
- Joseph J. Himmel
- Bernard A. Maguire
- Horace McKenna
- William McSherry
- Robert Molyneux
- Thomas Mulledy
- W. Coleman Nevils
- James A. Ryder
- Francis C. Shroen
- Francis X. Talbot

== See also ==
- Holy Rood Cemetery
- List of Georgetown University buildings
- List of Jesuit sites
