= Norberto M. Grzywacz =

Brazilian-American neuroscientist

Norberto M. Grzywacz is a Brazilian-American computational cognitive neuroscientist. He served as professor at the University of Southern California (USC), Georgetown University, and Loyola University Chicago. Moreover, at USC, he was the founding director of the Center for Visual Science and Technology, director of the Neuroscience Graduate Program, and the chair of the Department of Biomedical Engineering. Later, he became the dean of the Graduate School of Arts and Sciences of Georgetown University. Finally, he was the provost and chief academic officer of Loyola University Chicago.

== Biography ==
Grzywacz was born in 1957 in São Paulo, Brazil, growing up there and studying at Escola Alef Peretz.. and Colegio Equipe. In 1975, he moved to Israel, where he worked in Kibbutz Hazor Ashdod and enrolled at the Hebrew University of Jerusalem, a major research university. He graduated summa cum laude from the Hebrew University (1980), receiving Bachelor of Science degrees in physics and mathematics. Later, he received a Doctor of Philosophy degree (neuroscience, 1984) from the same university. He was then a postdoctoral fellow and research scientist at the Massachusetts Institute of Technology, where he stayed from 1984 until 1991. His work there was at the Artificial Intelligence Laboratory and Department of Brain and Cognitive Sciences. In 1991, he joined the Smith-Kettlewell Eye Research Institute in San Francisco as a senior research scientist. Next, in 2001, he was appointed full professor in the Department of Biomedical Engineering at USC. He was also a professor of Electrical Engineering and faculty member of its Neuroscience Graduate Program. He became director of the Program in 2005 and chair of the BME department in 2010. In 2015, Grzywacz joined Georgetown University as both professor of physics and neuroscience and dean of the Graduate School. Then, in 2020, he moved to Loyola University Chicago as provost and professor of both psychology and molecular pharmacology and neuroscience. During his time at Loyola, Grzywacz has participated in the national discussion about education policies of the second Trump administration.

== Research ==
For the first 30 years of his career, Grzywacz’s research focused on both the brain’s visual system and visual perception. He used neurophysiology, cellular biology, and computational neuroscience to study both photoreceptors and retinal processing and development. In parallel, he used psychophysics and computational neuroscience to study motion and contour perception. In addition, he studied the statistics of natural scenes and how the brain optimizes its visual processing according to these statistics. The studies included Bayesian models of vision perception and its performance under pathological conditions. He also led a National Institutes of Health Bioengineering Research Partnership, developing devices for age-related macular degeneration and was a leading member of the Engineering Research Center for Biomimetic MicroElectronic Systems, building a retinal prothesis for retinitis pigmentosa.

From 2015, Grzywacz changed research direction, focusing on the brain’s valuation system and aesthetic values. Some of the subjects that he investigated were musical aesthetic values as measured by the popularity of songs and neuroaesthetics in different arts and architecture. Other subjects included the social conformity of aesthetic values, individuality, social grouping and polarization, value instability, connections to artificial intelligence, and a theoretical framework for value learning

Grzywacz also directed the Georgetown-Santander Partnership on Social Economy to develop financial mechanisms to help underprivileged international communities. Furthermore, he directed the USC-Coulter Translational Research Partners Program to translate BME laboratory discoveries to the patients’ bedsides.

== Honors and awards ==
- Elected to the College of Fellows of the American Institute for Medical and Biological Engineering
- Inducted as a Member of Sigma Xi, The Scientific Research Honor Society
- Inducted as a Member of Alpha Sigma Nu
