= Edward Keonjian =

American electronics engineer (1909–1999)

Edward Keonjian (14 August 1909 – 6 September 1999) was a prominent engineer, an early leader in the field of low-power electronics, the father of microelectronics. In 1954 Keonjian designed the world's first solar-powered, pocket-sized radio transmitter. In 1959 Keonjian designed the first prototype of integrated circuit. In 1963 he organized the world's first international symposium on low-power electronics. Later on Keonjian collaborated with NASA astronaut Neil Armstrong as chief of failure analysis on the Apollo 11 project.

== Early life ==
Edward Keonjian was born in 1909 to an Armenian family in Tiflis, in the southern part of Russia, now known as the Georgian Republic. He obtained academic degrees in electrical engineering from Leningrad (now St. Petersburg) Institute of Electrical Engineering in 1932. When Leningrad was besieged in World War II, Edward was teaching at the institute. Millions were perishing from cold and starvation. When he too collapsed from hunger, he was mistaken for dead and placed in a common grave. A woman passing by saw a hand sticking out of this grave. Noticing a slight movement, she realised someone was still alive and rescued him. To her astonishment it was an old friend.

Not long afterward, Edward was evacuated from Leningrad, only to be captured, along with his wife Virginia and young son Edward Jr., by the Germans and sent to a slave labor camp. His duties at the camp included dismantling aircraft for spare parts. Liberated after World War II, he eventually emigrated to the United States of America with both his wife, (who died in 1969) and son. He arrived in 1947 penniless, knowing not one word of English, and with no friends or relatives. Nonetheless, he rose to become one of the outstanding scientists and inventors in microelectronics.

== Personal life ==
He was an avid traveler and a member of the Explorers Club, the Circumnavigators Club, and the Archaeological Institute of America.

Edward was married to his first wife Virginia, and they had one child, Edward Keonjian Jr. in 1937.

He moved to Green Valley in 1993 from Great Neck, New York with his second wife Maria.

In 1997 he chronicled his life story in his autobiography, Survived to Tell.

Edward is survived by his son, Edward Jr., grandchild Camille Keonjian and his widow Maria.

== Career in science ==
Keonjian was an early leader in the field of low-power electronics, and in 1954 designed the world's first solar-powered, pocket-sized radio transmitter. The transmitter now is on display at the Smithsonian National Museum of American History. Keonjian has had more than 100 publications and 27 U.S. and foreign patents. One of the books Keonjian edited and co-authored, Microelectronics: Theory, Design, and Fabrication, sold more than one million copies worldwide and has been translated into six languages since it was first published in 1963.

Keonjian began his work in microelectronics at General Electric in 1951. He later organised the first international symposium on low-power electronics in 1963. While employed by Grumman Aircraft, he supervised a staff of 165, and worked with Neil Armstrong as chief of failure analysis on the Apollo 11 project. He spent several years in India and Egypt working as an electronics specialist for the United Nations. He also spent 12 years as a U.S. member of NATO's research arm (AGARD) among many other distinguished career events.

He was a fellow of the Institute of Electrical and Electronics Engineers, won the Distinguished Colleague Award from the Aerospace Industries Association (AIA), and was a member of the New York Academy of Science. At the University of Arizona in Tucson, he has endowed the Edward Keonjian Visiting Professorship which permits some of the world's leading scientists in microelectronics to come to the university to work with the faculty and students. In 1998, he and his second wife established the Edward and Maria Keonjian Chair in Microelectronics at the university. In 2001, the University of Arizona placed a life size bronze cast, in Edward's honour, in the Electrical & Computer Engineering Building.

== Keonjian Distinguished Professorship in Microelectronics ==
To mark his centennial (as Edward Keonjian would have been 100 years old on 14 August 2009), the College of Engineering announced the establishment of the Edward and Maria Keonjian Distinguished Professorship in Microelectronics, the result of a million-dollar endowment by Keonjian and his wife Maria. The first holder of this distinguished professorship will be Wolfgang Fink, who joined the faculty of the University of Arizona in October 2009 coming from the California Institute of Technology and NASA’s Jet Propulsion Laboratory.

== Bibliography ==
- Keonjian, Edward Micropower electronics (paper) Dewey: 621.3817, LC: TL500 .N6 no. 77, OCLC: 1855674
- Keonjian, Edward (1970) Air and spaceborne computers Technivision Services (Slough, England)
- Keonjian, Edward (1963) Microelectronics theory, design, and fabrication. McGraw-Hill (New York) LCCN: 63013140, Dewey: 621.381, LC: TK7870 .K4
