= Tier-scalable reconnaissance =

Vehicle organization method for surveying

'Tier-Scalable Reconnaissance:Three-tiered utilization on Mars. Tier 1: spaceborne orbiter; Tier 2: airborne blimps; Tier 3: ground-based rovers.

Tier-scalable reconnaissance is the term for an approach to deploying and controlling vehicles in multiple areas of interest, such as in the exploration of planets or diverse regions on Earth. It is not a rigid or fixed paradigm, but is infinitely extensible. It uses hierarchical levels of oversight called tiers, each tier commanding or controlling the vehicles within the tier beneath it. The size of each tier can be scaled from one to many vehicles.

== Origination ==
The tier-scalable reconnaissance paradigm was originated by Dr. Wolfgang Fink et al. at the California Institute of Technology. It is based on the supposition that a perspective that integrates several vantage points enhances scientific understanding by optimizing exploration and consequent scientific results.

== History ==
Robotic planetary exploration missions typically use a single lander or rover. This is by design, driven primarily by safety and engineering constraints, at the expense of mission reliability and science return. Rovers are generally capable mobile platforms, but they are incapable of exploring multiple distant sites on a planetary surface. They are usually not used to explore potentially hazardous, scientifically interesting regions. At the other extreme, orbiting satellites have the benefit of a global perspective, but miss much surface detailed information. In either case, using a rover or orbiter, monitoring changing events on the surface is difficult, if not altogether impossible.

Tier-scalable reconnaissance, on the other hand, distributes the burden of data gathering across different logical tiers. In this way, a mission is more distributed, goal-driven, and less constrained. And, because of the numerous vehicles in each tier, a mission is more survivable and more capable. Consider the following scenario: The vehicles in the spaceborne and airborne tiers have overhead perspectives at different scales and resolutions. They map out areas of interest and acquire terrain data, and then choose targets for visiting and sampling by the ground vehicles. The overhead perspective also allows the higher tiers to determine paths for safe passage of these vehicles to their targets. The ground-tier vehicles gather local data that complement the remote sensing data obtained by the spaceborne and airborne vehicles.

In addition to the spaceborne and ground tiers, there may be several airborne tiers having vehicles such as balloons, blimps, and unmanned aerial vehicles (UAVs) at different altitudes. The tier-scalable reconnaissance paradigm is not limited to space, aerial, and ground applications but can be applied as well to water, subterranean, and ocean floor scenarios for scientific, commercial, or military purposes.

The tier-scalable reconnaissance paradigm is also highly automated. Spaceborne orbiters command and control the airborne vehicles autonomously, and the airborne vehicles in turn command and control the ground-tier reconnaissance vehicles. This allows orbiters, airships, and rovers to act in a unified, controlled manner. A mission that uses this paradigm is also considered more survivable. Since the airborne and ground-tier vehicles can be quite inexpensive, even expendable, many such vehicles can be used collectively to explore numerous science targets with complementary suites of instruments. Even if one or more vehicles should fail, others are present to take up the slack and continue the mission.

== Scenarios ==
Tier-scalable reconnaissance missions allow access to targets of great interest on planetary bodies, something which is not currently feasible with conventional single-rover or single-orbiter mission designs. Tier-scalable reconnaissance missions also enable spanning larger surface areas than previously possible – mimicking the way geologists explore regions on Earth – and therefore allow for greater data return.

Consider how the tier-scalable paradigm adapts to various environmental scenarios:

- Environments with atmospheres and with non-extreme surface temperatures (Earth, Mars):
  - Tier 1: Spaceborne orbiters, which guide deployment and control of
  - Tier 2: Airborne balloons or blimps, which in turn deploy and control
  - Tier 3: Surface-based buoys, and sensors, which in turn deploy and control
  - Tier 4: Submersibles and sensors.

- Environments with atmospheres and with extreme surface temperatures (Venus, Titan):
  - Tier 1: Spaceborne orbiters, which guide deployment and control of
  - Tier 2: Airborne balloons or blimps, which, if conditions permit, deploy and control
  - Tier 3: Ground sensor webs, rovers, or submersibles.

- Environments without atmospheres and with extreme surface conditions (Mercury, Moon, Europa):
  - Tier 1: Spaceborne orbiters, which guide deployment of and communicate with
  - Tier 2: Ground-based rovers and sensor webs.

== Commanding and operation ==
Using traditional means, simultaneous commanding of even a few reconnaissance vehicles becomes exceedingly complex, and so the logistical and computational demands of the tier-scalable paradigm scale quickly beyond the computers able to fit on such vehicles. This problem is overcome by using a round-robin concurrent commanding scheme. In this scheme, the vehicles are not commanded simultaneously; instead, each is commanded in turn, one by one. Moreover, each vehicle is given a small command set to execute. In this way, one vehicle is being commanded while the others are executing their issued commands. Depending on how close the vehicles are to each other and how accurately they execute their navigation commands, an airborne deployment reassessment is done so that refined trajectories are computed for each vehicle. Thus, each vehicle can be commanded in turn without threat of collision.

In the tier-scalable paradigm, ground-tier vehicles are commanded typically through the use of local airborne vehicles, such as blimps or balloons. The airborne vehicles contain onboard tracking and command systems for use with the ground-tier vehicles. With a wide field of view, the tracking and commanding systems on board the airborne vehicles determine optimal paths for the ground-tier vehicles, identifying both obstacles and interesting science targets. The ground-tier vehicles are then commanded to navigate through the operational area to the designated targets, while avoiding the identified obstacles. Therefore, this approach does not rely on the limited horizontal view of the ground-tier vehicles. Each ground-tier vehicle includes its own instrument suite to collect information, which is transmitted back to the airborne tier.

The ground-tier vehicles may conduct measurements en route to their targets. If an interesting object is encountered along the way, a vehicle may request permission of the commanding tier to explore it. A ground-tier vehicle may also find itself in an area of geography through which it cannot pass. In this case, it would request an alternate trajectory to its target, or even a target reassignment. These resolutions are possible because the higher-level airborne commanding tier is able to reassess the deployment of the vehicles, refining the trajectories of each of the vehicles at each step. In this way, even if a vehicle should go off-course, such as from sliding on sandy soil, the commanding tier will recalculate a path to the target based on the vehicle's current position.

== Applications ==
Robotic reconnaissance operations are called for in extreme environments such as space, as well as in potentially hazardous or inaccessible operational areas on Earth, such as those related to military or terrorist activities, or areas that have been exposed to biochemical agents, radiation, or natural disasters.

Tier-scalable reconnaissance opens access to geologic sites not currently feasible to visit, such as canyons, mountain ranges, chaotic and rugged terrain, impact basins and craters, even volcanoes and liquid pools or lakes. In addition, other exotic locales of scientific interest exist on the planetary bodies of the Solar System that are particularly crucial in the search for extraterrestrial biological activity in general, and sample return missions in particular.

Potential terrestrial applications include Homeland Security, border control, battlefield surveillance and reconnaissance, telecommunications relay, and weather observations, as well as monitoring of military checkpoints, standoff detection, and delivery/removal of explosives such as landmine cleanup.

== Advantages and implications ==
Some of the major advantages of tier-scalable reconnaissance architectures include:

1. Overhead navigation, enabling deployment of simple, inexpensive, expendable ground vehicles;
2. Efficient commanding of multiple ground vehicles;
3. Mission safety, reliability, and survivability;
4. Optimized target identification, path planning, and obstacle avoidance; and
5. Real time reconnaissance, allowing identification and characterization of active events.

Also, tier-scalable reconnaissance reduces driving requirements for ground vehicles, since they already are deployed in the vicinity of where they need to be. Therefore, driving is limited to “fine-tuning” the location of the ground-tier vehicles to perform local sampling, as opposed to “long-distance” driving towards the location where they need to be. Hence, inexpensive, expendable miniaturized vehicles with limited driving capabilities can be used.

The ground-tier vehicles have limited onboard computing capabilities, since they off-load data analysis to a primary lander or higher tiers that have higher-grade computing equipment. Conceptually, a primary lander is a higher-grade computing engine that also acts as a communication relay, much like a planetary internet router between the tiers. Thus, the tier-scalable reconnaissance paradigm, by its inherent architecture, is an extended distributed computing topology unto itself.

== Developments ==
Individual components of the tier-scalable reconnaissance paradigm are either under development or have already been tested and proven “in the field.” These include orbiters, balloons, blimps, airships, and ground-based vehicles such as rovers and landers as well as sensor webs. The biggest challenge, however, appears to be not so much the hardware but the “intelligent” software that would enable all the components of a tier scalable mission to be integrated and function autonomously.
