= Holy Rood Cemetery =

Cemetery in Northwest Washington, DC

Coordinates: 38.9176°N 77.0704°W

View of Washington Monument from Holy Rood Cemetery

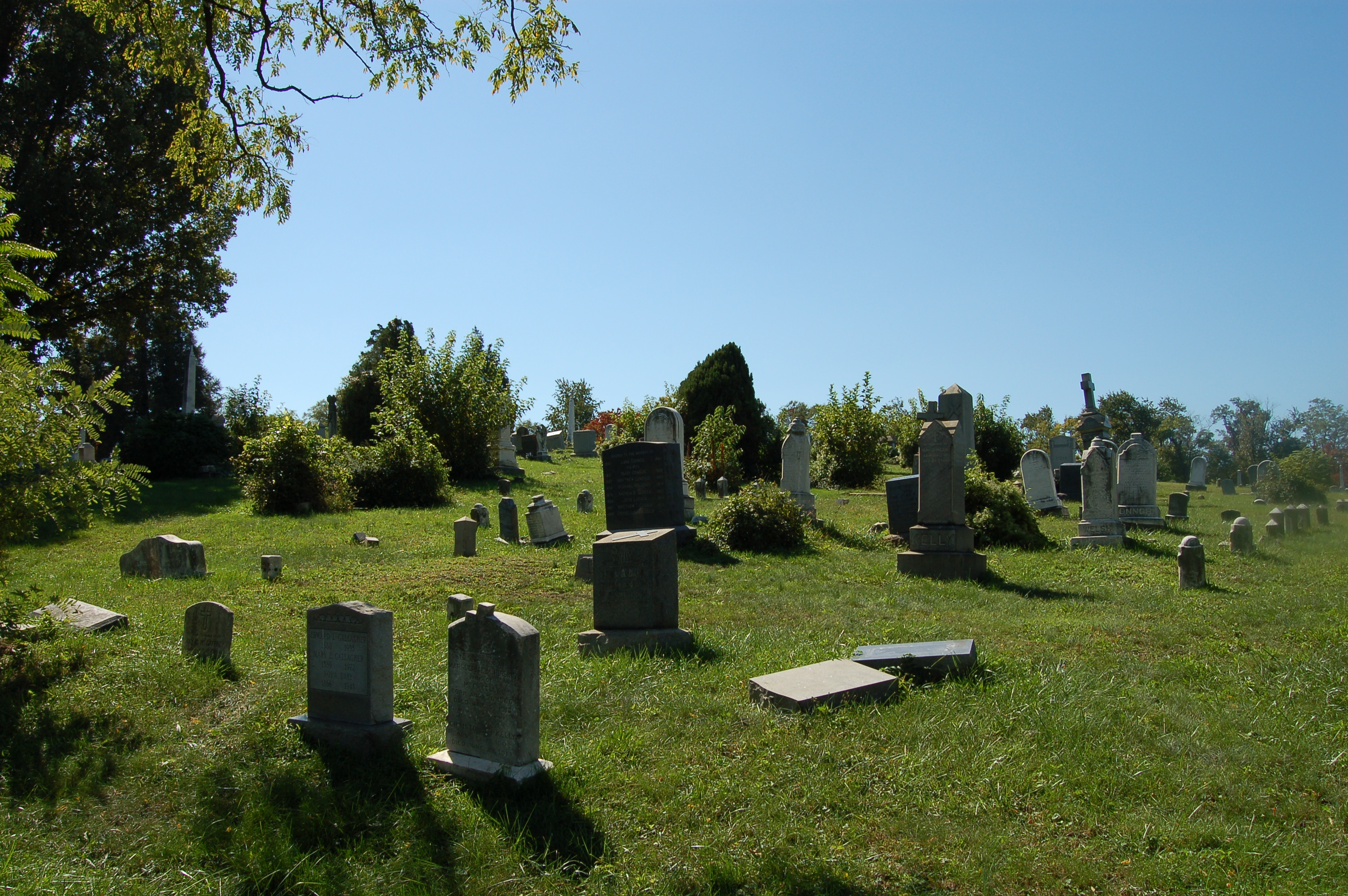
There are approximately 7,000 burials at Holy Rood Cemetery.

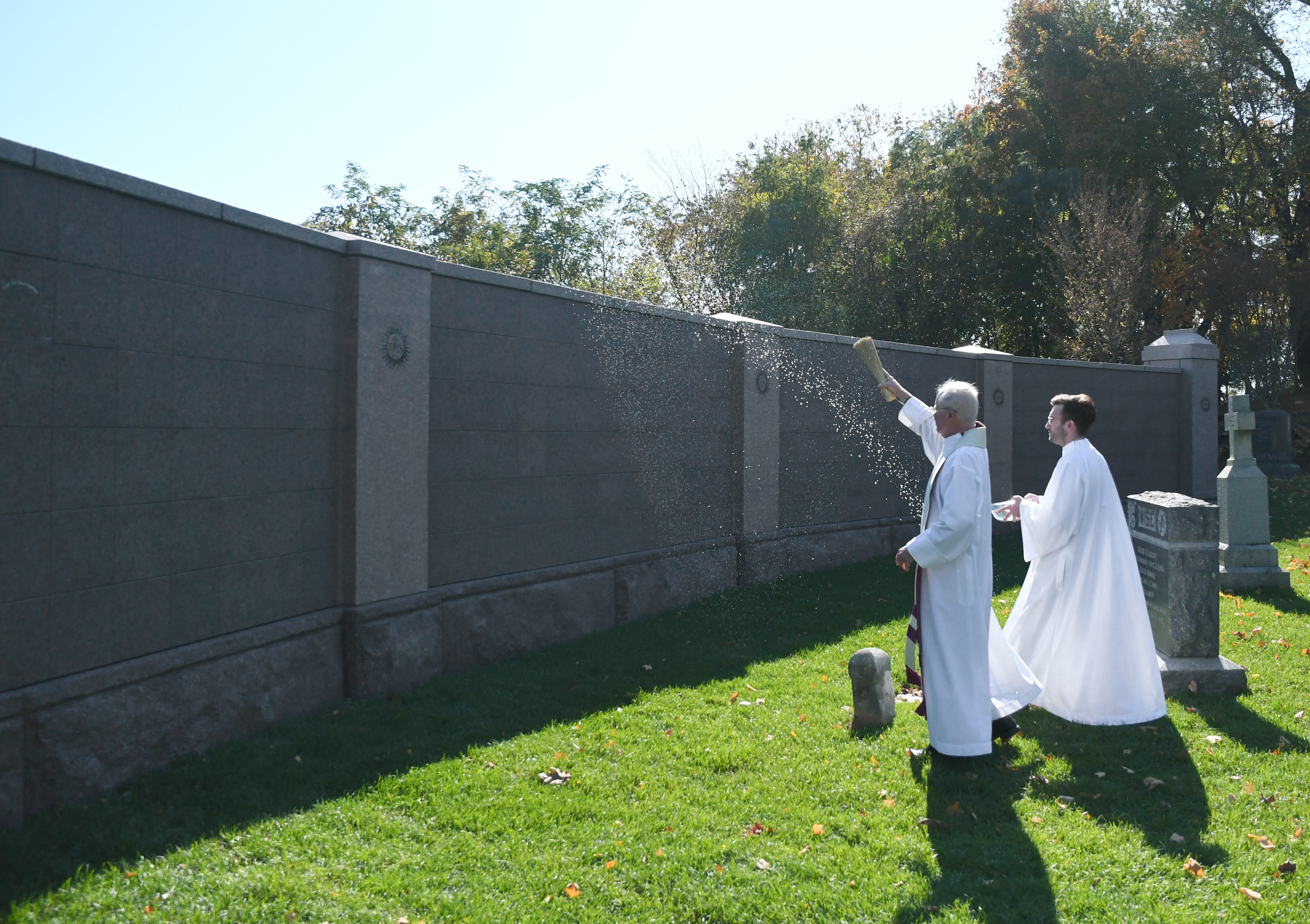
The blessing of Holy Trinity Columbarium on November 2, 2019

Holy Rood Cemetery is Holy Trinity Catholic Church's parish cemetery. It is located at 2126 Wisconsin Avenue N.W. at the southern end of Glover Park, adjacent to Georgetown in Washington, D.C. It is at one of the highest elevations in the city. The 6.5-acre cemetery contains approximately 7,000 burials, including the graves of European immigrants who built the C&O Canal and the City of Washington, along with Civil War veterans and others. At the western edge of the cemetery is the grave of Joseph Nevitt, a veteran of the American Revolutionary War. As many as 1,000 free and enslaved African Americans are buried at Holy Rood, in what may be the best-documented slave burial ground in the District of Columbia.

Originally called Trinity Church Upper Grave Yard, the burial ground was established by Holy Trinity Catholic Church in 1832. It was enlarged between 1850 and 1870, and renamed Holy Rood Cemetery. (Rood is an old English word for Cross.) The cemetery was active from the mid-nineteenth century until the early twentieth century. The last cemetery lot was sold in 1915, and a few burials took place as late as the 1990s. The cemetery is closed for additional burials.

Holy Rood Cemetery is owned by Georgetown University which founded Holy Trinity Catholic Church in 1787. In the 1980s, the university explored the possibility of disinterring the bodies buried there so the land could be put to other uses, but was blocked by a legal action brought by the remaining holders of burial rights. Without revenue from lot sales, the cemetery fell into disrepair. Headstones toppled, there were weeds and invasive shrubs, and the roadway deteriorated.

In 2018, Georgetown University and Holy Trinity Catholic Church announced plans to restore the historic cemetery and build a columbarium there. Holy Trinity Columbarium. In November 2019, Holy Trinity completed the 645-niche columbarium at Holy Rood. The columbarium consists of a restored brownstone crypt, containing 99 niches in the crypt interior, and a seven-panel granite columbarium wall, containing 546 niches, built in the carriage way opposite the crypt. The first entombment in the columbarium was on November 2, 2019.

Priority for purchasing niches at the columbarium is given to Holy Trinity parishioners, persons with ancestors buried at Holy Rood, and Georgetown University alumni, faculty and staff. Others are welcome to purchase niches as they are available. One does not have to be a Catholic for remains to be inurned at the Holy Trinity columbarium. The Holy Trinity columbarium website contains information on purchasing a niche. .

Restoration of Holy Rood Cemetery was completed in 2019. It included enhancements to the entrance, a new ornamental gate and fence, and extensive relandscaping. Hundreds of trees and shrubs were planted, the roadway was repaved, and fallen headstones were reset. Additional landscaping has been done throughout the cemetery since that time. A portion of the proceeds from columbarium niche sales funds a Perpetual Care Endowment that has been established to maintain and improve Holy Rood Cemetery.

== See also ==
- Jesuit Community Cemetery (Georgetown University)
- Holy Trinity Columbarium
- Mount Olivet Cemetery (Washington, D.C.)
