= Arthur A. O'Leary =

American Jesuit educator

The Reverend Arthur A. O'Leary SJ
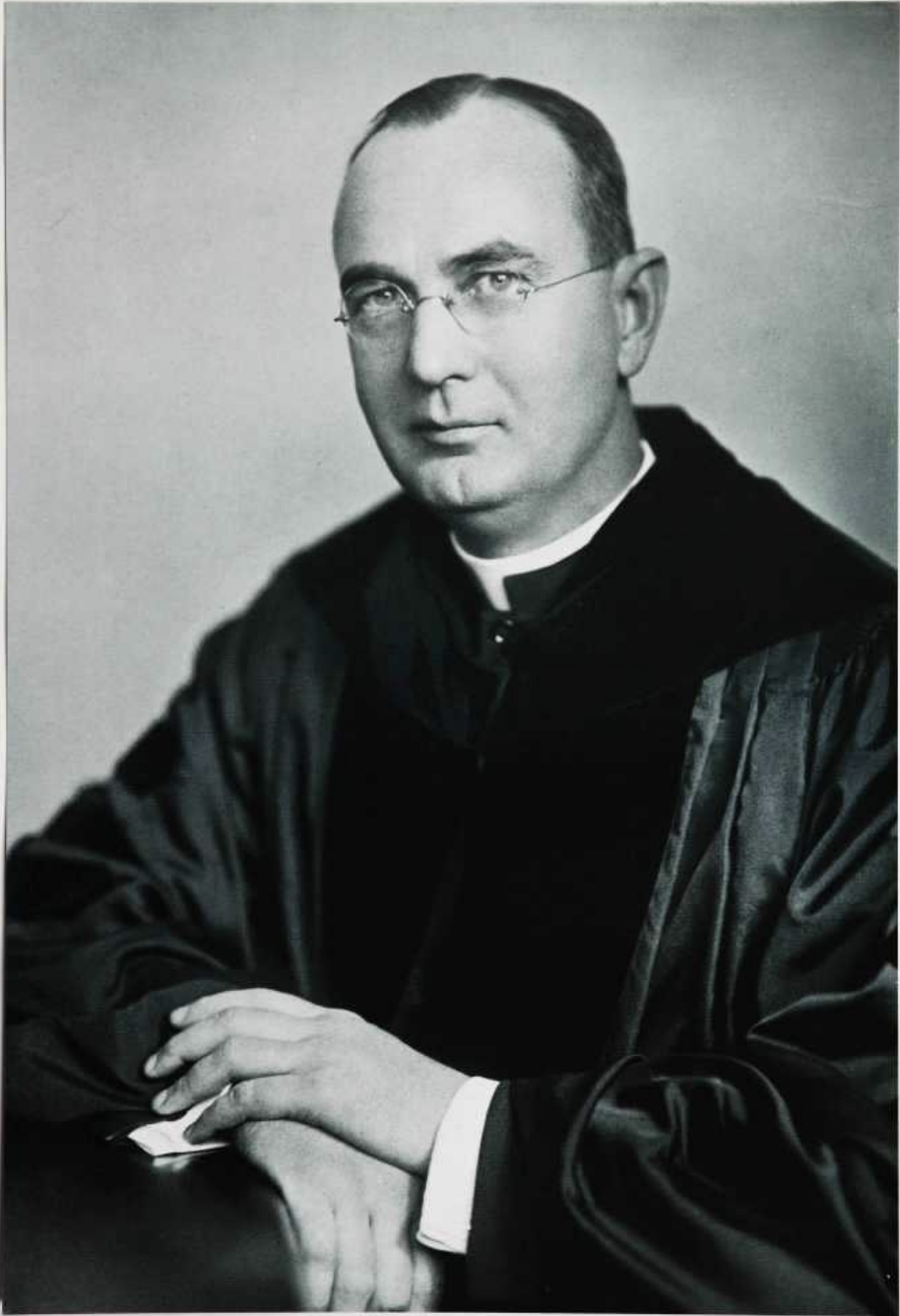
- O'Leary in 1936

40th President of Georgetown University
- In office 1935–1942
- Preceded by: W. Coleman Nevils
- Succeeded by: Lawrence C. Gorman

Personal details
- Born: September 27, 1887 Washington, D.C., U.S.
- Died: February 8, 1962 (aged 74) Washington, D.C.
- Education: St. Andrew-on-Hudson; Woodstock College (PhD)

Orders
- Ordination: 1919

Arthur Aloysius O'Leary SJ (September 27, 1887 – February 8, 1962) was an American Catholic priest and Jesuit, who served as president of Georgetown University in from 1935 to 1942. Born in Washington, D.C., he studied at Gonzaga College before entering the Society of Jesus and continuing his education at St. Andrew-on-Hudson and Woodstock College. He then taught at St. Andrew-on-Hudson and Georgetown University, where he eventually became the university's librarian, and undertook a major improvement of the Georgetown University Library. O'Leary then assumed the presidency of the university in the midst of the Great Depression and, later, World War II.

In office, he began a revitalization of the nationwide alumni network from the disparate, regional chapters, re-established the Graduate School of Arts and Sciences as a standalone school within the university, and significantly expanded Georgetown's athletic programs. After, he became the pastor of Holy Trinity Church in Georgetown, and then pastor of St. Andrew-on-Hudson. Towards the end of his life, he returned to Georgetown, where he died.

== Early life ==
Arthur Aloysius O'Leary was born on September 27, 1887, in Washington, D.C. His father was a worker on the Baltimore and Ohio Railroad. O'Leary was educated at Gonzaga College, and his parish was the adjacent St. Aloysius Church. He entered the Society of Jesus on August 14, 1903, and was sent to St. Andrew-on-Hudson in New York for his scholasticate. He then completed his studies at Woodstock College in Maryland, where he earned a Doctor of Philosophy. He went to Georgetown University in 1912, as a professor of philosophy, holding the position until 1916. At the same time, he was also spiritual director for the university. He was finally ordained a priest in 1919, becoming a member of the first class of priests ordained at Georgetown. He then returned to St. Andrew-on-Hudson, where he taught for several years.

In 1923, O'Leary became the chief librarian of Georgetown. He made significant improvements to the library, including expanding access to the library to alumni, creating a reference desk, and establishing a system for interlibrary loans. He began in 1935 to comprehensively catalogue all of the university's 177,000 volumes of books according to the Library of Congress Control Number. This signified the first time that the library's holdings in various subjects had all been organized together.

== President of Georgetown University ==
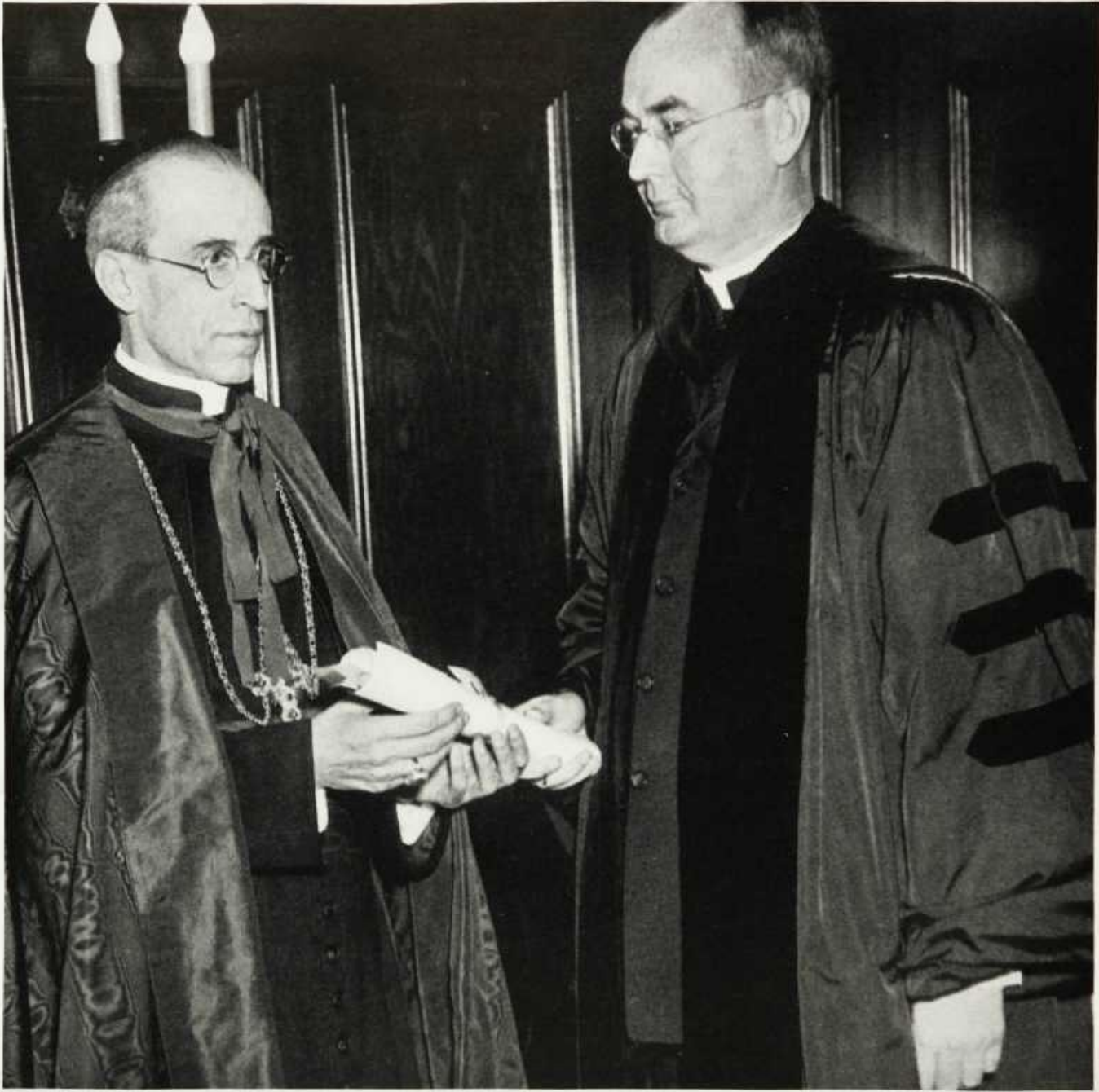
O'Leary presenting Cardinal Eugenio Pacelli (future Pope Pius XII) with an honorary doctorate in 1939

The end of Coleman Nevils' second term as president of Georgetown University was due in 1934. However, the faculty and alumni of Georgetown petitioned the Jesuit Superior General in Rome to allow Nevils to remain for an additional year in order to prepare a suitable successor. With the general's approval of the petition, in October 1935, when Nevils was sent to Japan for three months to represent the American Red Cross at an international conference, he appointed O'Leary as acting president in his stead. In July of that year, O'Leary was officially appointed president of the university, becoming the first native of Washington, D.C. to hold the office. The inauguration ceremony on November 23 was attended by several justices of the U.S. Supreme Court, government officials, many foreign diplomats, delegates of several hundred educational institutions and learned societies, and the Apostolic Delegate to the United States, Amleto Giovanni Cicognani. His presidency was largely shaped by the ongoing Great Depression.

By the 1930s, Georgetown's alumni association had become largely defunct. In the latter half of the decade, several alumni chapters around the country, especially driven by alumni of Georgetown Law School, had begun to reconstitute. In O'Leary's first month of office, he announced that he would establish an office for organizing alumni nationally, not just in regional chapters. This goal did not immediately materialize, and in 1937, Edmund A. Walsh, the founder of the School of Foreign Service, urged O'Leary to revitalize the alumni association. In response, O'Leary traveled around the country in the spring of 1938 to reorganize the regional chapters and appointed one of Georgetown's professors of English as the first secretary of the national association; the board of directors officially approved the national alumni organization in the fall of 1938, which began compiling a national directory and publishing a newsletter.

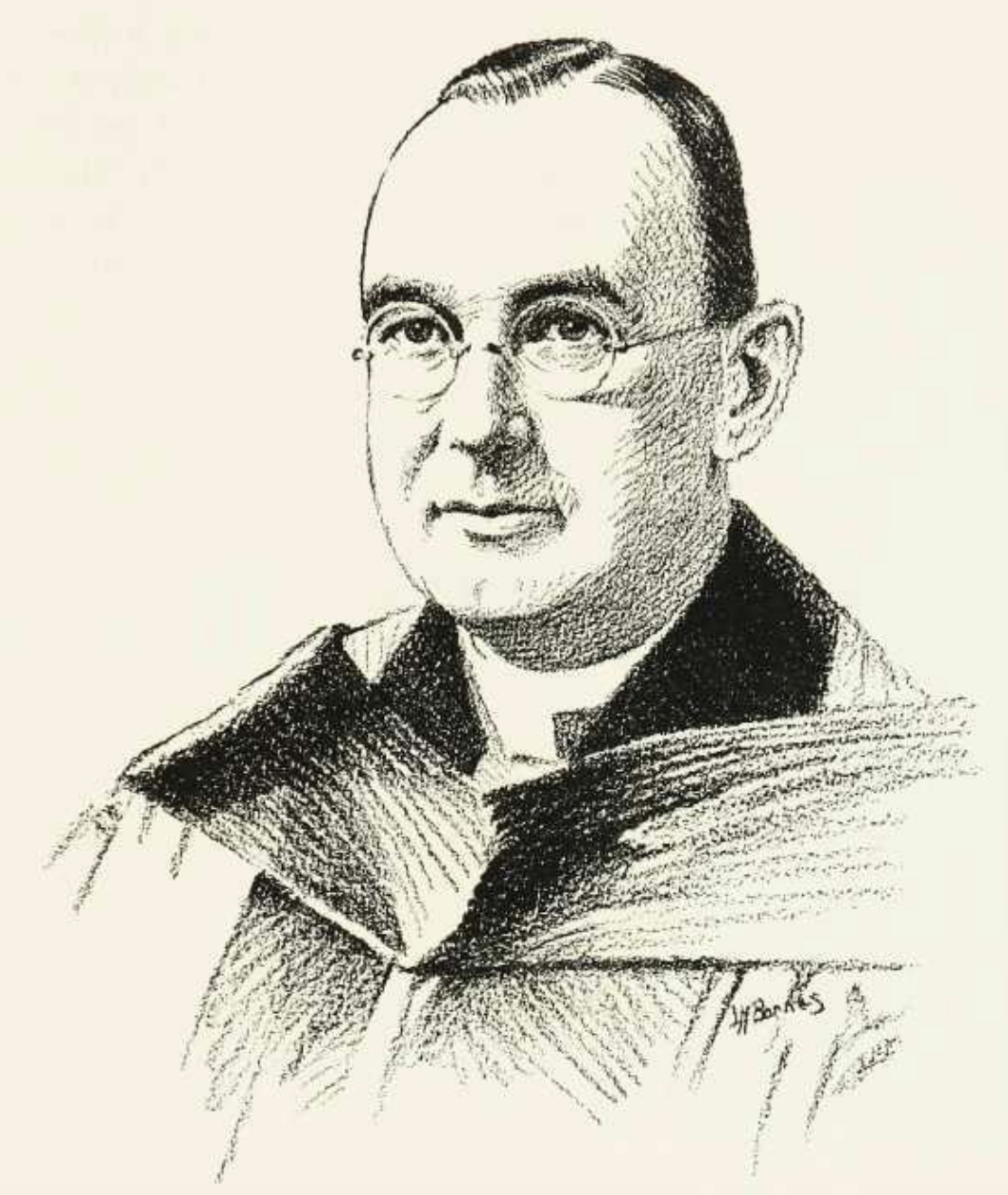
Sketch of O'Leary in 1939

O'Leary was a proponent of expanding Georgetown's athletic programs, in part due to the recognition that they proved to be profitable for other universities, and greatly expanded scholarships available to athletes. Unlike his predecessor, O'Leary was a rather conservative figure. In 1935, O'Leary warned of the prevalence of communism in the United States. The following year, The Hoya, Georgetown's student newspaper, echoed this sentiment, reporting on the growth of the Communist Party in the United States and the prevalence of communism among faculty across the country. In light of protests at college campuses around the country against involvement in World War II, such as the presence of the Reserve Officers' Training Corps on campuses, and increasing political tension, O'Leary requested that the Jesuit provincial superior appoint a censor in 1937 to review any public speeches that would be given by Jesuits, so as to remove any political overtones. Due to the national mobilization during the War, Georgetown's campus became a testing ground for the Army Specialized Training Center.

During O'Leary's presidency, the Graduate School of Arts and Sciences was re-established as an independent school within the university. (Note: The Graduate School of Arts and Sciences had been merged into Georgetown College in 1907 due to pressure from the Catholic University of America to have graduate-level education at only one Catholic university in Washington, D.C.) This was part of O'Leary's aim to have Georgetown meet the Association of American Universities' standard for graduate education. He also increased the number of graduate faculty and students and made major significant improvements to the library's holdings. By 1937, the school began awarding doctoral degrees once again in some departments. In the law school, O'Leary decided to condense the two leadership positions of dean and regent (the latter of which was always a Jesuit) into a single position, due to the resignation of the previous dean.

Toward the end of his presidency, O'Leary's health began to deteriorate. He underwent surgery to remove kidney stones in 1937. Soon after the operation, he again became seriously ill and nearly died. As a result, he went to New England and Jamaica for several months to recuperate, returning to the university in October 1937. With his illness progressing, in December 1942, the Jesuit authorities took the unusual step of replacing the president of the university during wartime, naming Lawrence C. Gorman as his successor.

== Later years ==
In 1947, O'Leary replaced James A. McCarl as the pastor of Holy Trinity Church in Georgetown. Obtaining permission from the Metropolitan Police Department, he began the practice of students at the Holy Trinity School using N Street as their playground for recess. He remained pastor until 1953, when he was succeeded by Emory Ross. His final assignment was as pastor of St. Andrew-on-Hudson, which he held until his death. O'Leary died on February 8, 1962, at Georgetown University Hospital. The requiem mass was held at St. Aloysius Church in Washington, D.C.

== Notes ==
Academic offices
Preceded by W. Coleman Nevils	40th President of Georgetown University; 1935–1942	Succeeded by Lawrence C. Gorman
Catholic Church titles
Preceded by James A. McCarl	40th Pastor of Holy Trinity Church; 1947–1953	Succeeded by Emory Ross
