= J. Hunter Guthrie =

American Jesuit philosopher

The Reverend J. Hunter Guthrie SJ
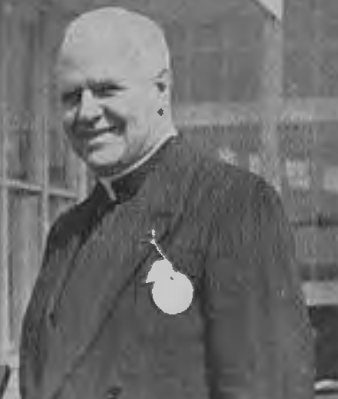
- J. Hunter Guthrie in 1949

42nd President of Georgetown University
- In office 1949–1952
- Preceded by: Lawrence C. Gorman
- Succeeded by: Edward B. Bunn

Personal details
- Born: January 8, 1901 New York City, United States
- Died: November 11, 1974 (aged 73) Wernersville, Pennsylvania, U.S.
- Resting place: Jesuit Community Cemetery
- Education: Woodstock College (BA, MA); Pontifical Gregorian University (STD); University of Paris (Dr de l'U)
- Awards: National Order of Honour and Merit

Orders
- Ordination: June 23, 1930

Philosophical work
- Era: 20th-century philosophy
- School: Existentialism, logical positivism, analytic philosophy, scholasticism

Joseph Hunter Guthrie SJ (8 January 1901 – 11 November 1974) was an American academic philosopher, writer, Jesuit, and Catholic priest. Born in New York City, he entered the Society of Jesus in 1917, and began his studies at Woodstock College. Following his undergraduate and graduate work there, he taught at Jesuit institutions in the Philippines until 1927. Following his ordination in 1930, he received doctorates in theology and philosophy from the Pontifical Gregorian University and the University of Paris, respectively. He then returned to the United States, where he became a professor of philosophy at Woodstock College and Fordham University.

In 1943, Guthrie became the chairman of graduate philosophy at Georgetown University and dean of the Graduate School of Arts and Sciences. In this role, he admitted the first women to the school on equal terms as men. For twenty years, he promoted the belief that intellectuals must play a central role in combatting the ideologies that led to World War II. To that end, he was a member of the drafting committee of the UNESCO charter, was a co-founder of an American academy of Catholic intellectuals, and travelled the world with the U.S. State Department, for which he received honors from several countries and organizations.

Guthrie became the president of Georgetown University in 1949, and a major decision he made was to abolish the university's football program, believing it to be inconsistent with the educational purpose of a Catholic university. He also oversaw construction of McDonough Gymnasium. His tenure ended abruptly in 1952, when he did not return at the start of the academic year. His resignation resulted from illness, as well as frustration with senior administrators who resisted his attempts to centralize governance of the university. In his later years, he taught at Saint Joseph's College in Philadelphia, and died in Wernersville, Pennsylvania, in 1974.

== Early life ==
Joseph Hunter Guthrie was born on January 8, 1901, in New York City, to parents Jacob Francis Guthrie and Mary Guthrie (née Ross). He enrolled at Fordham Preparatory School in 1913, and graduated in 1917. On July 30 of that year, he entered the Society of Jesus at the novitiate of St. Andrew-on-Hudson. Guthrie began studying science and philosophy at Weston College in Massachusetts, and completed his undergraduate education at Woodstock College in Maryland, where he graduated in 1923 with a Bachelor of Arts and in 1924 with a Master of Arts. Guthrie then taught English, Latin, and rhetoric at the seminary in Vigan, in the Philippines, from 1924 to 1925, and English, Latin, and economics at the Ateneo de Manila University from 1925 to 1927. He also coached drama at both the Vigan Seminary and Ateneo, which resulted in his Ateneo Passion Play being performed in 1927 at the Manila Grand Opera House.

=== European studies ===
Guthrie returned to Woodstock College that year, traveling through China, Japan, North Africa, and India on his return voyage. On June 23, 1930, he was ordained a Catholic priest at Woodstock. He was then sent to the Pontifical Gregorian University in Rome, where he earned a Doctor of Sacred Theology degree in 1931. He spent the following year studying ascetical theology at the Drongen Abbey and at the Catholic University of Louvain in Belgium. On August 15, 1934, he professed his final vows in the Chapel of Saint Denis on Montmartre in Paris, which were received by Anthony Joseph Schuler, the Bishop of El Paso, Texas.

Guthrie began work on his doctorate in philosophy, studying at the Friedrich Wilhelm University of Berlin, the Ludwig-Maximilians-Universität München, the University of Freiburg, and the University of Paris. During this time, he became ill with tuberculosis, which required that he be treated in Asheville, North Carolina. He then returned to the University of Paris to defend his dissertation on phenomenology, for which he was awarded a docteur de l'université with highest honors in 1937. During his time in Europe, Guthrie studied under Martin Heidegger, Werner Jaeger, and Emile Brédier, and was closely acquainted with Edith Stein, Simone Weil, Jacques Maritain, and Étienne Gilson. He was also in contact with the Vienna Circle. As a result, his philosophical interests were German existentialism, logical positivism, and analytic philosophy, the latter of which he studied a decade before it become prominent in American universities.

Following his education, Guthrie taught philosophy at Woodstock College from 1937 to 1940. He became a professor and chairman of the department of graduate philosophy at Fordham University in 1940, remaining in the position for three years. He was also an assistant editor of The Journal of Philosophy, Thought, and Philosophy Abstracts, and was a prolific author.

== Georgetown University ==
=== Deanship ===
In 1943, Guthrie was appointed chairman of the graduate department of philosophy at Georgetown University, which made him ex officio the dean of the Graduate School of Arts and Sciences. Later, he also was named the chairman of deans of the university. During his term, the first eleven women were admitted to the graduate school on equal status as men. (Note: The first women ever admitted to Georgetown University's Graduate School were nine religious sisters from the Georgetown Visitation Monastery in the 1920s, one of whom earned a Ph.D.) The president of the university, Lawrence C. Gorman, described this action as initially experimental and as a "wartime concession" that proved successful. Guthrie sought to revitalize the graduate school, and recruited prominent faculty who fled Europe during World War II, especially those in the fields of philosophy and political science.

The reputation and quality of academics in the graduate department of philosophy, which had a separate location and faculty from its undergraduate counterpart, was greatly improved during his term, and it was said that the graduate school "firmly established" itself for the first time. Having succeeded Edward C. Phillips as dean, Guthrie was replaced by Gerard Yates.

==== Worldwide academic advocacy ====
Following the end of World War II, Guthrie became a proponent of making academia a key instrument in securing future world peace by combating ideologies of nationalism, totalitarianism, and scientific racism. To that end, he became a member of the U.S. Commission on Restructuring Education, which met at Princeton University in 1940, alongside British academics, to implement democratic principles in education. He was also a member of the chartering committee of UNESCO, which met in Nice in 1945.

Guthrie supported a proposal by several Catholic intellectuals to create an American academy for Catholic thought. This occurred in the context of many American think tanks and intellectual organizations, such as the Council on Foreign Relations, reevaluating their purposes and missions, so as to ensure that another world war would never happen again. The body's twofold mission would be "reconstructing Catholic intellectual life" in the aftermath of the war, and maintaining a "presence in the total work of the United Nations Educational and Scientific Organization." Guthrie envisioned the organization as being composed primarily of academic laymen, rather than clergy. Eventually, the academy came to fruition, and he became a co-founder of the Catholic Commission on Intellectual and Cultural Affairs (CCICA) in 1946. He was also a member of the American Academy of Political and Social Science and the Medieval Academy of America.

Guthrie was a prolific traveller, visiting every continent except Australia. He traveled as an exchange specialist with the U.S. Department of State and the United States Information Agency to the Iberian Peninsula and Latin America from 1947 to 1950. He was a polyglot, being fluent in four languages and able to read in four more. Guthrie received the Grand Cross of the Order of Civil Merit of Spain in 1948 for his writings on the Spanish philosopher Francisco Suárez, and lectures at the University of Barcelona, University of Madrid, and University of Salamanca. He received the Freedoms Foundation Award in 1950, the National Order of Honour and Merit of Haiti in 1954, and the Air University Award in 1958 for casting a tie-breaking vote to create the Air University. Film director Samuel Bronston consulted with Guthrie in the 1950s on films set in Ancient Greece and Rome.

=== Presidency ===
On February 18, 1949, Guthrie was appointed to succeed Gorman as the president of Georgetown University. Under his leadership, McDonough Gymnasium was built, with construction starting in 1950, and the building opening in December 1951. One of Guthrie's first actions was the revival of the board of regents in April 1949, whose purpose was to advise the president and participate in fundraising and promotion of the university. Another of his primary goals was to centralize the university administration under the office of the president. At the time he took office, the schools of medicine, law, and foreign service operated close to autonomously in their governance, finances, and academics.

Much of Guthrie's philosophy of education was motivated by his support for scholasticism. He wrote against the modern conception of academic freedom as a "false liberty to license" that deprived students of the "divine dimension of reality". In this view, university-level education should teach students of the divine revelation. At the same time, he advocated for the sort of classical education that existed in antiquity, although supplemented by modern science. In sum, he believed that modern thought had little to offer.

Guthrie's presidency came to an end abruptly in 1952. In the summer of that year, he left for the American West for a retreat and to fundraise. He did not return at the start of the academic year, prompting many rumors on campus. He submitted his resignation to the university board of directors the following October, and it was announced that the Jesuit authorities in Rome had selected Edward B. Bunn as his successor. One historian later determined that Guthrie's ousting was not entirely voluntary, but rather was due to a combination of factors. In July 1952, his health had begun to deteriorate; he moved in with his mother in Annapolis, Maryland, and soon thereafter was treated at hospitals in Baltimore, Maryland and Charlotte, North Carolina. Additionally, he had become frustrated with the fact that each of the university professional schools was headed by a Jesuit regent. They vigorously opposed his attempts to centralize the administration of the university, and when Guthrie tried to invoke the authorities in Rome to support his effort, he felt that he did not have their backing.

==== Abolition of football ====
"Into football goes a stupendous outlay of time, money, and manpower, accompanied by the raw passions of greed and slavish devotion, the ignoble emotions of spite, bitterness, and sly cunning."

— J. Hunter Guthrie

One major decision of Guthrie's presidency was to discontinue Georgetown's football program in 1951. He offered multiple reasons for his decision, the first of which was that the sport contributed little to the educational purpose of the university and was unbecoming of a Catholic educational institution. Financial considerations also motivated Guthrie. He disapproved that collegiate football had become "big business." The sport consumed the vast majority of the university's entire sports budget, and, combined with ancillary costs of running the program, resulted in a substantial, annual net deficit. Moreover, the team had been performing poorly for many seasons. As a result, Georgetown became the most prominent of 38 schools—many of them Catholic—to drop their football programs by 1951, and the university saw a gradual de-emphasis of sports in general. Guthrie's decision prompted a strong backlash from alumni, and the football program was restored 12 years later.

== Later years ==
Guthrie continued to suffer from the damage tuberculosis had done to his lungs. After spending time recuperating, he became a professor at Saint Joseph's College in Philadelphia in 1953, and for a time, served as chair of the department of philosophy. He was interested in people who learn differently and worked intensively with one student, who he identified as having a learning disability that science later would identify as dyslexia. He also advocated for the creation of a Latin American studies program at Saint Joseph's, which was created in 1960.

Guthrie assumed professor emeritus status at Saint Joseph's in 1969. He died on 11 November 1974 at the Jesuit novitiate of St. Isaac Jogues in Wernersville, Pennsylvania. His body was returned to Georgetown University and was buried in the Jesuit Community Cemetery.

== Writings ==
- Introduction Au Problème de L'histoire de la Philosophie: La Métaphysique de L'individualité a Priori de la Pensée [Introduction to the Problem of the History of Philosophy: The Metaphysics of Individuality a Priori to Thought]. Bibliothèque de philosophie contemporaine (Thesis) (in French). Paris: Félix Alcan. 1937. OCLC 300099420.
- Guthrie, Hunter; Walsh, Gerald Groveland, eds. (1941). A Philosophical Symposium on American Catholic Education. New York: Fordham University Press. OCLC 10296628.
- Tradition and Prospect: The Inauguration of the Very Reverend Hunter Guthrie, S.J., as Thirty-fifth President of Georgetown University, April 30 and May 1, 1949. Washington, D.C.: Georgetown University Press. 1949. OCLC 612812806.
- The Sacred Fetish of Academic Freedom (PDF) (Speech). 51st Commencement Exercises. Georgetown University: Georgetown University Alumni Magazine. June 12, 1950. Archived (PDF) from the original on January 9, 2019.
- "The Absent Guest: An Appraisal of John Carroll" (PDF). Georgetown University Alumni Magazine. Vol. 5, no. 1. May 1952. pp. 5, 9. Archived (PDF) from the original on January 9, 2019.
- Congar, Yves M.J. (1968). Guthrie, Hunter (ed.). A History of Theology. Translated by Guthrie, Hunter. Garden City, New York: Doubleday. OCLC 191218.

== Notes ==
Academic offices
Preceded by Edward C. Phillips	Dean of the Georgetown University Graduate School of Arts and Sciences; 1943—1949	Succeeded by Gerard Yates
Preceded by Lawrence C. Gorman	42nd President of Georgetown University; 1949—1952	Succeeded by Edward B. Bunn
