= David Lightfoot (linguist) =

American linguist

- Born: David William Lightfoot; February 10, 1945 (age 81)
- Occupations: Linguist, academic, educator, author
- Years active: 1971—present
- Awards: The Linguistic Society of America's Linguistic Service Award (2013), The Linguistic Society of America's Distinguished Teaching Award (2013)

Academic background
- Education: University of Michigan
- Thesis: Natural Logic and the Moods of Classical Greek (1971)
- Doctoral advisor: Robin Lakoff

Academic work
- Discipline: Linguistics
- Sub-discipline: Syntactic theory, language acquisition, language change
- Institutions: McGill University; University of Utrecht; University of Maryland; Georgetown University
- Notable works: Principles of Diachronic Syntax (CUP 1979), The Language Lottery: Toward a Biology of Grammars (MIT Press, 1982), How to Set Parameters: Arguments from Language Change (MIT Press, 1991), and The Development of Language: Acquisition, Change, and Evolution (Blackwell, 1999).

David William Lightfoot (born February 10, 1945) is an American linguist and academic. He is an Emeritus Professor of linguistics at Georgetown University. Lightfoot served as assistant director of the National Science Foundation's Directorate for Social, Behavioral and Economic Sciences from 2005 to 2009 and as President of the Linguistic Society of America (LSA) from 2010 to 2011. He founded the Department of Linguistics at the University of Maryland. Lightfoot has been a Guest Professor of linguistics at the Beijing Language and Culture University (BLCU) since 2016. (Note: He has also been a Visiting Professor in Salzburg (Austria), UCLA, Federal University, Rio de Janeiro (Brazil), the University of Geneva (Switzerland), and Federal University of Santa Catarina, Florianopolis (Brazil), among others and was invited to give the Insight Distinguished Public Lecture at Newcastle University (UK; 2016).)

Lightfoot is a Fellow of the American Association for the Advancement of Science (AAAS), the Linguistic Society of America, and the American Council of Learned Societies. Lightfoot works on generative syntax, language acquisition, and historical language change. He is known for arguing that describing the principles of grammar requires understanding how language is acquired, linking grammatical theory to human biology. He argued that children are born to assign structures to their ambient language. This yields a view of language variation not based on parameters defined at Universal Grammar. His approach extends Minimalist thinking (by dispensing with parameters) evaluation metrics for the selection of grammars, and any independent parsing mechanism. Instead, both external and internal languages play crucial, interacting roles, allowing an “open” Universal Grammar.

== Early life and education ==
Lightfoot was born in Looe, Cornwall, UK but grew up in Plymouth. After receiving his B.A. in Classical Studies from King's College London in 1966, he worked for a year as Labor Relations manager at Ford Motor Company. He earned a Ph.D. in Linguistics from the University of Michigan in 1971. His doctoral thesis, supervised by Robin Lakoff, was titled Natural Logic and the Moods of Classical Greek.

== Career ==
Lightfoot held professorial appointments at McGill University and the University of Utrecht before joining the University of Maryland. He founded and chaired the linguistics department, at Maryland, where he also served as Associate Director of the Neuroscience and Cognitive Sciences program. (Note: While working at the University of Maryland, he had a joint appointment as Professor of Linguistics at the University of Reading.) (Note: While working at the University of Maryland, he had a joint appointment as Professor of Linguistics at the University of Reading.)

In 2001, Lightfoot was appointed Dean of the Graduate School at Georgetown University. He took a leave of absence from 2005 to 2009 to serve as Assistant Director of the National Science Foundation, where he oversaw the Directorate for Social, Behavioral, and Economic Sciences. Upon returning to Georgetown in 2009, he directed the undergraduate Cognitive Science program and the graduate program in Communication, Culture & Technology.

Lightfoot was elected a fellow of the American Association for the Advancement of Science (AAAS) in 2004 and a fellow of the Linguistic Society of America (LSA) in 2006. He served as President of the LSA from 2010 to 2011. He has held visiting positions at institutes including Beijing Language and Culture University, the University of Geneva, and the Federal University of Rio de Janeiro.

== Research ==
=== Principles of Diachronic Syntax ===
Diachronic syntax is the study of how the structure of sentences in a language changes over time. Just like words and pronunciation can evolve, so can the rules that govern how we arrange words to form sentences. For example, in Old English, people could move words around more freely because endings on words showed their role in the sentence, but in Modern English, word order is much more fixed (we usually stick to subject-verb-object as in "The cat chased the mouse"). Diachronic syntax looks at these kinds of changes, helping us understand how and why languages evolve over centuries.

His 1979 book, Principles of Diachronic Syntax, influenced the study of syntactic change. In this work, Lightfoot presented a framework for understanding syntactic change, focusing on the concept of "radical reanalysis," where new generations of speakers reinterpret linguistic structures based on the input they receive. Lightfoot argued that syntactic changes occur when the complexity of a language's grammar becomes too opaque for new learners to process, leading to reanalysis. His ideas were centered around generative grammar, and he emphasized the need to separate theories of grammar from theories of change, which was considered a major step forward in diachronic syntax. A key contribution was his proposal of the "Transparency Principle," which suggested that language changes when the connection between underlying structures and surface forms becomes too complex or opaque for learners to process easily. While some reviewers, like Fischer, van der Leek, and Warner, recognized the methodological clarity of his work, they also critiqued aspects such as the "Transparency Principle," suggesting that some of Lightfoot's explanations were overly simplistic. Despite these criticisms, Principles of Diachronic Syntax played a role in renewing interest in the study of syntactic change within generative grammar. Lightfoot's analyses, particularly his treatment of English modals, have remained influential in shaping research on how syntactic structures evolve over time.

Lightfoot's methodology also made a lasting impact by arguing that simultaneous changes in a language's grammar could often be traced back to a single underlying cause. His case studies, particularly in the history of English, such as the development of modal verbs and impersonal constructions, demonstrated how his theoretical insights could be applied to real historical data.

=== The Language Lottery ===
In The Language Lottery: Toward a Biology of Grammar, Lightfoot presented an introduction to the biolinguistic approach of generative grammar, positing that humans are born with an innate capacity for language acquisition. Rooted in Noam Chomsky’s theories, Lightfoot compared linguistic development to a lottery, where every child draws the capacity to acquire any language as a result of a genetic "language program." Reviews were largely positive, with Yukio Otsu praising the book for effectively illustrating complex linguistic theories for a broad readership, though he noted that some specialized terms could be challenging for non-linguists. Lyle Jenkins lauded the work for fostering interdisciplinary dialogue and appreciated its "explanatory clarity" on the role of innate structures in language, though he suggested that some sections might require background knowledge in linguistics to fully grasp. Fred D'Agostino also praised Lightfoot's structured explanations of generative grammar's foundational principles, considering them "particularly clear and forceful".

=== How New Languages Emerge ===
His 2006 book, How New Languages Emerge, studies the processes involved in language change, particularly focusing on how new languages come into being. Central to his argument is the distinction between internal (I-language) and external (E-language) systems. Internal language refers to an individual's mental grammar shaped by biological factors, while external language encompasses the societal and environmental influences. Lightfoot stresses the role of children in language development, as they construct new grammars based on linguistic cues from their surroundings. The book combines linguistic theory, historical linguistics, and cognitive science to explain how languages evolve over time. Lightfoot argues that language change is not only a social phenomenon but also deeply connected to the cognitive processes of language acquisition. He shows that structural changes in language are contingent on shifts in grammatical cues encountered by children, which gradually spread through the community. French historical linguist Chris H. Reintges described the work as "an engaged manifesto for a new historical linguistics". Reintges said that Lightfoot's work "shows that the emergence of novel grammars, while part of language change, is a phenomenon of much broader scope that may shed new light on well-studied cases of morphosyntactic change."

=== Born to Parse ===
Lightfoot's 2020 book, Born to Parse: How Children Select Their Languages, signified, as Chinese linguist Yu Fu noted, his own "major shift from the parameter-based approach to the parsing-based approach to language acquisition and change." The work also presented a radical shift in linguistic theory, emphasizing that children naturally parse their ambient language using an internal linguistic system. This approach challenges long-standing views of language acquisition, particularly the idea of Universal Grammar (UG) as being parameter-based. Lightfoot dispenses with the need for predefined grammatical parameters, an evaluation metric for grammar selection, and an independent parsing mechanism. Instead, he argues that language variation arises as children parse external language, making sense of their internal linguistic structures. This perspective aligns with the Minimalist Program, contributing to a simplified view of grammar acquisition while addressing historical developments in English syntax, such as modal verbs and verb movement. Lightfoot also provides several case studies on English and theoretical insights, demonstrating how children's parsing abilities lead to language change and the emergence of specific linguistic properties.

== Selected publications ==
=== Books written ===
- Principles of diachronic syntax. Cambridge University Press: Cambridge (1979).
- Lightfoot, David. "The language lottery: Toward a biology of grammars." MIT Press: Cambridge, MA (1982). (Note: Spanish translation: Ediciones Antonio Machado, Madrid; Chinese translation: Liaoning Educational Publishing House; Section on 'Creativity and Political Enlightenment' reprinted in C. Otero, ed. 1994 Noam Chomsky: Critical assessments. Routledge: London.)
- Lightfoot, David. How to set parameters: Arguments from language change. MIT Press: Cambridge, MA (1991).
- Lightfoot, David. The development of language: acquisition, change and evolution. Blackwell (1999).
- Anderson, Stephen. The language organ: linguistics as cognitive physiology. Cambridge University Press (2002). (Note: With Stephen Anderson.)
- Lightfoot, D. W. How new languages emerge. Cambridge University Press (2006).
- Born to parse: How children select their languages. MIT Press: Cambridge, MA (2020)

=== Books edited ===
- Hornstein, Norbert, and David Lightfoot. "Explanation in linguistics: The logical problem of language acquisition." Longman: London (1981). (Note: With an introduction; Japanese translation: Shinyo-sha.)
- Lightfoot, David and Norbert Hornstein. "Verb movement." Cambridge University Press (1994). (Note: With an introduction. Co-written with N. Hornstein.)
- David Lightfoot. “Syntactic effects of morphological change.” Oxford University Press: Oxford (2002). (Note: With an introduction.)
- Lightfoot, David and Jon Havenhill. “Variable properties: Their nature and acquisition.” Georgetown University Press (2019). (Note: With J. Havenhill.)

=== Selected book chapters ===
- Lightfoot, David. "Trace theory and explanation." In Current Approaches to Syntax, pp. 137–166. Brill, 1980. doi:10.1163/9789004373105_008
- The diachronic analysis of English modals. In J. Anderson & C. Jones, eds. Historical linguistics: Proceedings of the First International Conference on Historical Linguistics (North Holland: Amsterdam): 219 249 (1974).
- Introduction to N. Chomsky Syntactic structures (2nd edition). Mouton de Gruyter: Berlin (2002).
- Cuing a different grammar. In A. van Kemenade and B. Los, eds. Handbook on the history of English. Blackwell: Oxford, 24-44 (2006).
- Natural selection-itis. In M. Tallerman & K. Gibson, eds. Oxford handbook of language evolution. Oxford University Press: Oxford. 313-317 (2011).
- Transparency. In A. Ledgeway & I. Roberts, eds. Cambridge handbook of historical syntax. Cambridge UP 322-337 (2017).
- Acquisition and learnability. In A. Ledgeway & I. Roberts, eds. Cambridge handbook of historical syntax. Cambridge UP 381-400 (2017).

=== Selected articles ===
- Two types of locality. Linguistic Inquiry 18.4: 537-77 (1987) (with J. Aoun, N. Hornstein & A. Weinberg).
- Grammars for people. Journal of Linguistics 31.2: 393-99 (1995).
- Discovering new variable properties without parameters. Linguistic Analysis 41 3-4, special edition by S. Karimi & M. Piattelli-Palmarini, Parameters 409-444. (2017).
- Chomsky’s I-languages: Rethinking catastrophes. Acta Linguistica Academica 66.3 349-369. (2019).

== Awards ==
- The Linguistic Society of America's Linguistic Service Award (2013)
- The Linguistic Society of America's Distinguished Teaching Award (2013)
