= The Stylus of Boston College =

American literary magazine founded in 1882

The Stylus is the literary magazine of Boston College. Founded in 1882, it is one of the oldest literary magazines in the United States, and it is the oldest literary organization on Boston College's campus.

== History ==
At the time of its founding, the Stylus acted as both literary magazine and newspaper for Boston College. The Heights, Boston College's current student newspaper, split off in 1919 and eventually became independent of the university itself.

The Stylus has been published continuously since its founding in 1882, except from the spring of 1889 to December 1893 when construction forced a suspension of publication. There was also a hiatus during World War II due to a substantial drop in student enrollment. However, this is not generally considered to be a break in continual publishing for American collegiate publications. Several other organizations claim continuous publishing despite World War II hiatuses - including, among others, the Harvard Advocate (est. 1866).

Digitized issues of The Stylus are available online from 1883 to 1922.

== Current Club ==
Though originally published monthly, Stylus now releases issues once per semester. It is run by an Editor-In-Chief, Senior Editor(s), and a team of other editors.
