= Center for Biomimetic Microelectronic Systems =

Center for Biomimetic MicroElectronic Systems is on the campus of the University of Southern California.

The Biomimetic MicroElectronic Systems (BMES) vision is realized first by identifying the unmet medical needs in the 3 testbeds of blindness, paralysis, and central nervous system impairments. The solutions to these needs are then developed by designing and synthesizing engineered system specifications from medical, scientific, and engineering disciplines. Furthermore, to develop these novel biomimetic microelectronic systems, our BMES ERC's work is concentrated in three thrust areas of enabling technology that are at the heart of immediate and long-term interest to the rapidly growing medical device industry.

Areas of Research The three testbed areas are 1) Retinal Prosthesis (Restoring Vision to the blind) 2) Neuromuscular Prosthesis (reanimating paralyzed limbs) 3) Cortical Prosthesis (Repairing cognitive disability). The three thrust areas are 1) mixed-signal systems on a chip, 2) power and data management, and 3) interface technology (electrode and electronic packaging technologies).

The Center has approximately 45 faculty that it works with at USC, Caltech and UC Santa Cruz, and an industrial advisory board of approximately ten companies.
