= Thomas F. Mulledy =

American Jesuit priest (1794–1860)

The Very Reverend Thomas F. Mulledy SJ
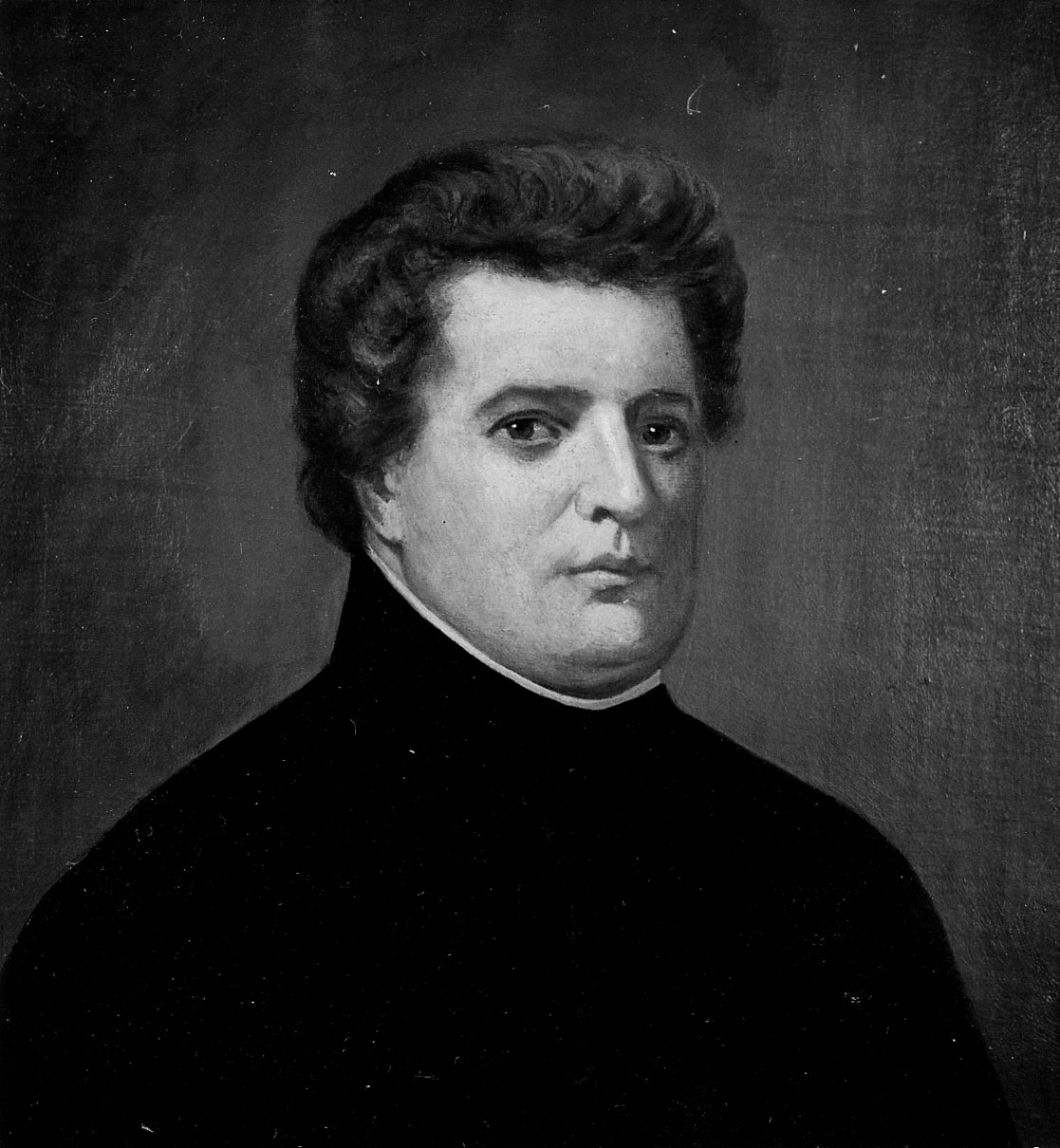

17th & 22nd President of Georgetown College
- In office 1845–1848
- Preceded by: Samuel Mulledy
- Succeeded by: James A. Ryder
- In office 1825–1837
- Preceded by: John W. Beschter
- Succeeded by: William McSherry

1st President of the College of the Holy Cross
- In office 1843–1845
- Succeeded by: James A. Ryder

Personal details
- Born: August 12, 1794 Romney, Virginia, U.S. (Note: At the time, Romney was located in the Commonwealth of Virginia, as the State of West Virginia had not yet been created.)
- Died: July 20, 1860 (aged 65) Georgetown, D.C., U.S. (Note: Georgetown was a separately chartered city within the District of Columbia until the consolidation of the district's governments into a single entity, Washington, D.C., with the Organic Act of 1871.)
- Resting place: Jesuit Community Cemetery
- Relations: Samuel Mulledy (brother)
- Education: Georgetown College; Pontificio Collegio Urbano de Propaganda Fide

Orders
- Ordination: 1825

Thomas F. Mulledy SJ (/mʌˈleɪdi/ muh-LAY-dee; August 12, 1794 – July 20, 1860) was an American Catholic priest and Jesuit who became the president of Georgetown College, a founder of the College of the Holy Cross, and a Jesuit provincial superior. His brother, Samuel Mulledy, also became a Jesuit and president of Georgetown.

Mulledy entered the Society of Jesus and was educated for the priesthood in Rome, before completing his education in the United States. He twice served as president of Georgetown College in Washington, D.C. At Georgetown, Mulledy undertook a significant building campaign, which resulted in Gervase Hall and Mulledy Hall (later renamed Isaac Hawkins Hall). He became the second provincial superior of the Maryland Province of the Jesuit order, and orchestrated the sale of the province's slaves in 1838 to settle its debts. This resulted in outcry from his fellow Jesuits and censure by the church authorities in Rome, who exiled him to Nice in the Kingdom of Piedmont-Sardinia for several years. While provincial superior, Mulledy was also the vicar general for the Diocese of Boston.

Following his return to the United States, Mulledy was appointed as the first president of the College of the Holy Cross in 1843 and oversaw its establishment, including the construction of its first building. Both in the United States and in Rome, he developed a reputation as combative and insubordinate, much to the discontent of his fellow Jesuits and his superiors. Others praised him for his administrative skills. In his later years, he was prolific in delivering sermons at Holy Cross, and played a role in seeing the college through investigations by the Know Nothing Party. He also served as pastor of St. John the Evangelist Church and president of St. John's Literary Institution in Frederick, Maryland, where he expelled a significant portion of the student body for protesting the strict discipline he imposed, leading to the school's permanent decline. He then was assigned as pastor of Holy Trinity Church in Georgetown, and briefly as the superior at Saint Joseph's College in Philadelphia.

In 2015, Georgetown renamed Mulledy Hall due to Mulledy's involvement in the 1838 slave sale. His name was also removed from a building at the College of the Holy Cross in 2020.

== Early life and education ==
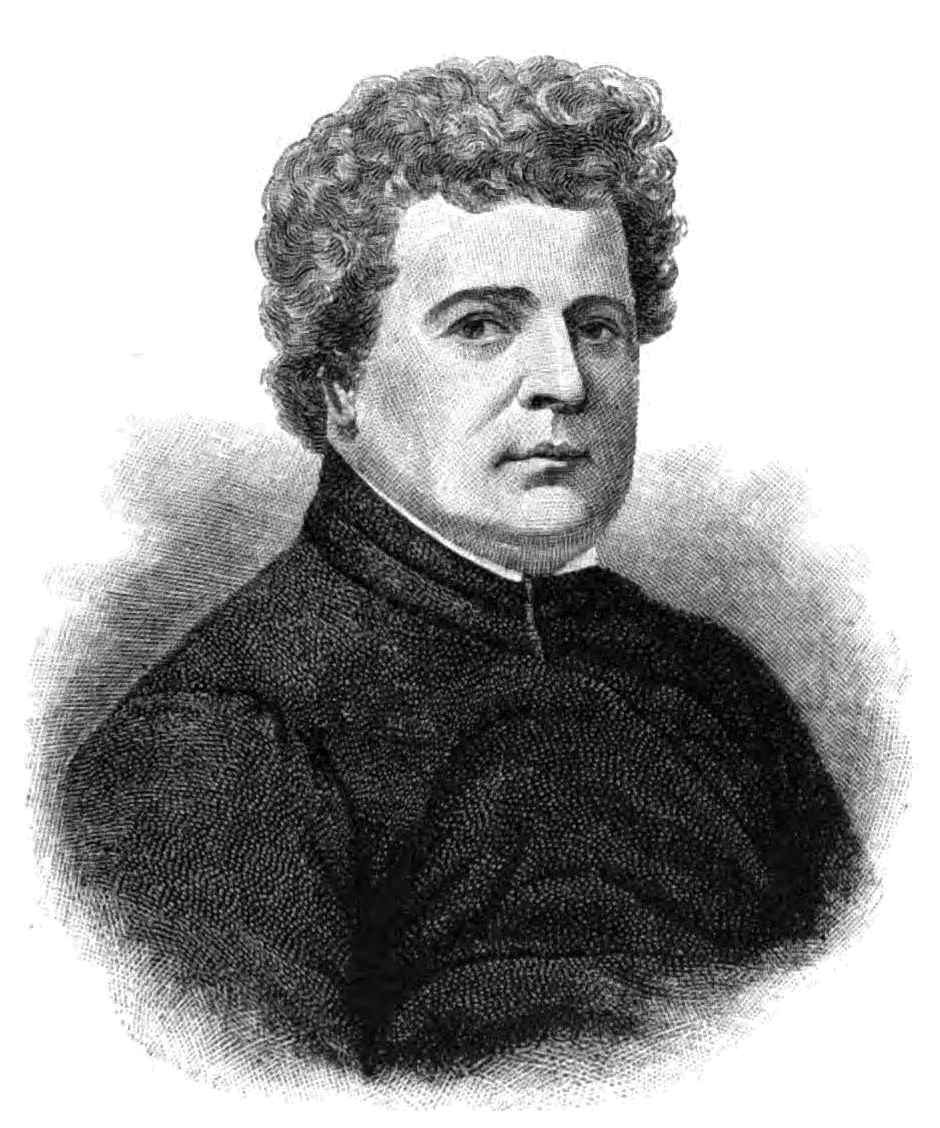
Portrait of Mulledy, 1860

Thomas Mulledy (Note: The Mulledy surname is spelled "Mullady" by some older sources. It is also erroneously spelled "Mullaly" by some sources.) was born on August 12, 1794, in Romney, Virginia (today part of West Virginia), to Irish immigrant parents. His father, also named Thomas Mulledy, was a poor farmer. His mother, Sarah Cochrane, from Virginia, was not Catholic. So the two could marry, they obtained a canonical dispensation, and agreed that their sons would be raised Catholic, while their daughters would be raised Protestant. Before receiving any higher education, Thomas Mulledy and his brother, Samuel, taught at the Romney Academy in their hometown. Like his brother, Samuel went on to become a Jesuit and the president of Georgetown College.

Thomas later enrolled as a student at Georgetown College in Washington, D.C., on December 14, 1813, having to pay for his own education, as his brother did. He left the school in February 1815 to travel with nine others to White Marsh Manor in Prince George's County, Maryland, where they entered the Society of Jesus. He returned to teach at Georgetown in 1817. While there, he contracted a disease that was unknown to the physicians of the time, and he feared death was imminent. In his debilitated state, he received the viaticum, and was thereafter restored to health, a turn of events that some considered miraculous. He was appointed by the Virginia General Assembly to the board of trustees for the town of Romney in 1818.

In 1820, he was sent to study philosophy in Rome; on the voyage, he was accompanied by Charles Constantine Pise, James Ryder, and George Fenwick. There, he studied at the Pontificio Collegio Urbano de Propaganda Fide for two years, and spent a further two as a tutor to the crown prince of Naples. Alongside his priestly studies, he was exposed to literature and science, and became regarded as among the most eminent American scholars of Italian language and literature.

Mulledy was ordained a priest in Rome in 1825, and then began his tertianship in Chieri, near Turin. By 1828, he was teaching logic, metaphysics, and ethics at a Jesuit college in Chambéry. He left Italy later that year. It was not until December 1827 that the Society raised enough money to pay for his and other Jesuit students' return to the United States, and that the Jesuit Superior General was satisfied that the Society had regained a footing in the United States after its suppression. He left from the port of Livorno on a treacherous voyage that lasted 171 days, and caused some in the United States to fear that the three Jesuits aboard had perished. Eventually, he arrived at Georgetown on December 22, 1828, where he was made the prefect of studies, as well as professor of philosophy. Mulledy provided the most comprehensive account of the mysterious events at Wizard Clip at the time.

== Georgetown College ==
=== First presidency ===
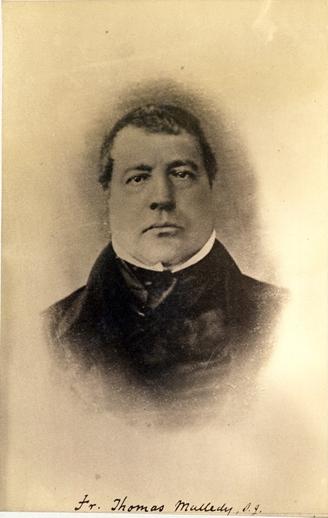
Daguerreotype of Mulledy, c. 1840s

Mulledy was appointed president of Georgetown College on September 14, 1829, following John William Beschter's brief leadership of the school. Several months before, Peter Kenney had been appointed apostolic visitor to the Jesuit mission in Maryland, and oversaw Mulledy, who was viewed cautiously by the Jesuit superiors in Europe for his ardent republicanism; at the same time, Mulledy was made a consultor to Kenney. When he assumed the presidency, the state of Georgetown was poor; the number of students had dropped to only 45. By 1834, this had rebounded to 140.

During his presidency, the Jesuit Ratio Studiorum was more fully implemented, primarily under the direction of the prefect of studies, George Fenwick. In May 1830, the first observation in the United States of the Month of Mary was undertaken by Georgetown's chapter of the Sodality of the Blessed Virgin, which had been founded in 1808 as the first chapter of the sodality in the United States. With a growth in the number of books owned by the university under Mulledy's presidency, he undertook to organize the 12,000 volumes in a single library room in Old North on February 16, 1831.

Mulledy had a reputation for being relatively lax in enforcing discipline. In 1833, a rebellion was staged by a group of several students who plotted to ambush and assault the prefect of studies, in response to the prefect's reporting of a student who imbibed to the point of intoxication at taverns when the class took a trip to the Capitol. The plot was thwarted, and Mulledy expelled several of the students. In March 1833, Pope Gregory XVI chartered Georgetown College as an ecclesiastical university, the first such institution in the United States. This authorized it to grant canonical degrees in philosophy and theology. The college narrowly escaped destruction on December 10, 1836, when a carpenter's shed near the Walks caught fire. The students and faculty worked to contain the flames and prevented their spread to the nearby dormitory.

During Mulledy's tenure, Georgetown was frequently visited by congressmen and senators. On the whole, he was viewed as having effectively managed the college. Kenney reported back to Rome that Mulledy had been a successful administrator despite his "extremely impetuous enthusiasm and excessive patriotism." His first presidency of Georgetown ended in 1837, and he was succeeded by William McSherry.

==== Building campaign ====
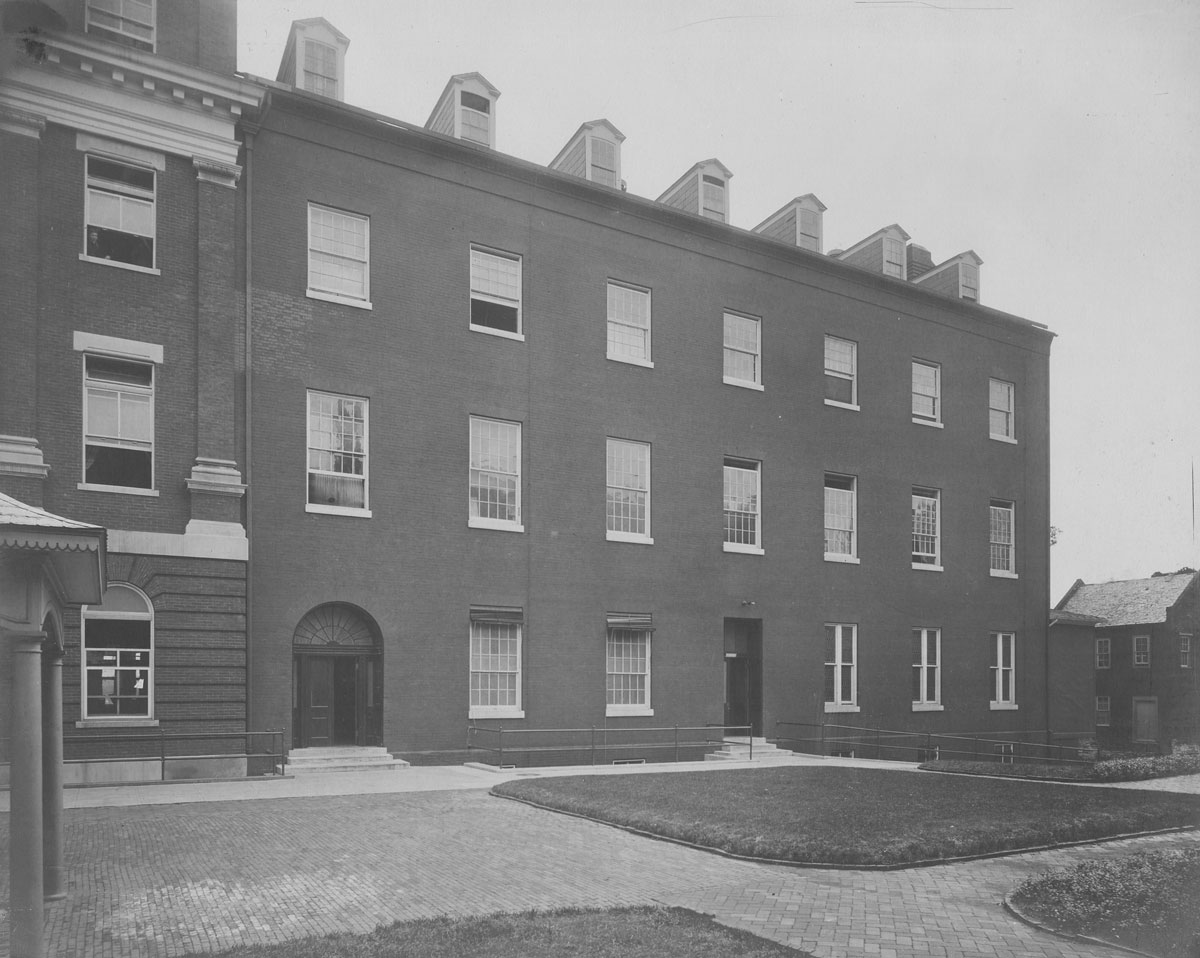
Mulledy Hall (now Isaac Hawkins Hall) was completed in 1833.

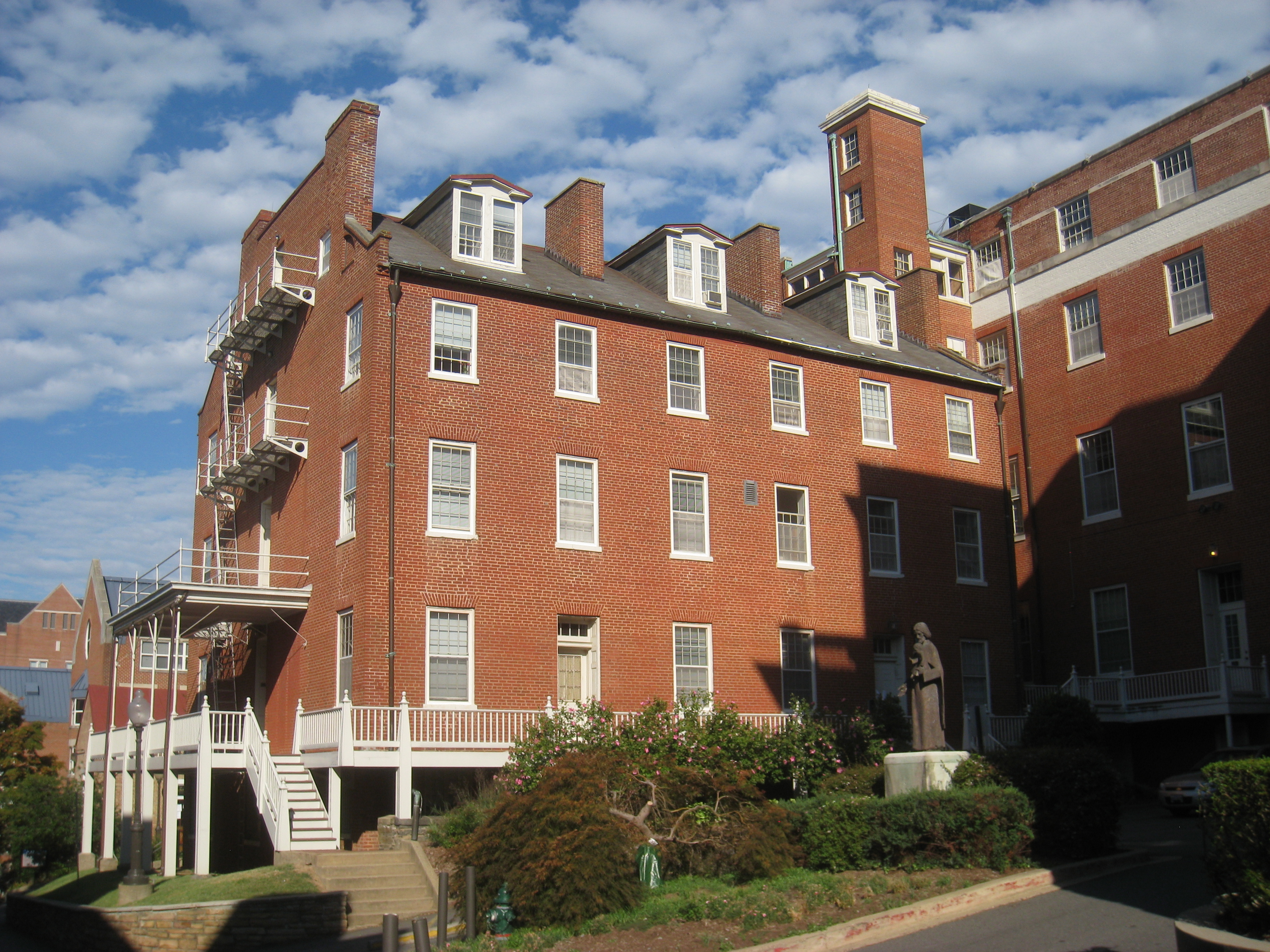
Gervase Hall was completed in 1831.

With the steady increase in the number of students during his presidency, and an influx of money as remuneration from a widow who entered the Georgetown Visitation Monastery and entrusted her son as a ward of Georgetown, Mulledy was able to construct a new infirmary building in 1831. This building was named Gervase Hall, after Brother Thomas Gervase, a missionary who sailed to Maryland aboard the voyage of The Ark and The Dove in 1634.

Notwithstanding the misgivings of the Jesuit province's treasurer, Francis Dzierozynski, about Mulledy's penchant for building despite the province's precarious finances, Mulledy undertook an even larger project the following year. He was initially unable to fund a new building that would house a refectory, chapel, study hall, and dormitories; eventually, a Jesuit who owned property because he had not yet taken final vows offered Mulledy a substantial loan. With this money, groundbreaking on the new building occurred in July 1832 and was completed by July of the following year. This building became known as Mulledy Hall. Erection of these two buildings was enabled by a loan of $7,000 from the widow of Stephen Decatur.

During Mulledy's presidency, "the Walks", a network of scenic paths through the backwoods of the campus, were created. They were the result of Joseph West, a Jesuit brother's, purchase of the land for the college. Following Congress' donation of land to Columbian College in 1832, Georgetown requested similar benefits. The legislature eventually awarded Georgetown lots worth $25,000, (~$717,849 in 2024) the titles to which were transferred to the college on February 20, 1837.

=== Second presidency ===
Mulledy again took up the presidency of Georgetown on September 6, 1845, following his brother Samuel Mulledy. Soon thereafter, President James K. Polk requested that the Catholic Church send chaplains to minister to Catholic soldiers in the Mexican–American War; as a result, Mulledy's vice president and procurator left for the Rio Grande to minister to General Zachary Taylor's army.

In 1848, due to popular uprisings in the Italian states, many Jesuits fled Italy and took refuge for a time at Georgetown College, including the future famed astronomer Angelo Secchi and scientist Giambattista Pianciani. That same year, Mulledy resigned as president of the college, and was succeeded by James Ryder.

== Maryland provincial ==
In October 1837, Mulledy was appointed the provincial superior of the Maryland Province of the Jesuits. He succeeded William McSherry, the province's first provincial, who in turn succeeded Mulledy as president of Georgetown College. His leadership of the province proved dissatisfactory to the European Jesuits in the United States who took issue with Mulledy's laxity in discipline, including failing to enforce sacred silence and permitting overindulgence of alcohol and visitation of female guests in the Jesuits' quarters. This eventually led to intervention by the Superior General in Rome, who ordered Mulledy to remedy these lapses in discipline.

In 1838, Bishop Benedict Joseph Fenwick appointed Mulledy vicar general of the Diocese of Boston, which he held simultaneously as provincial superior. He was considered by Bishop John Dubois as one of the potential choices for coadjutor bishop for the Diocese of New York, but ultimately John Hughes was selected over him in 1838.

=== Slave sale ===
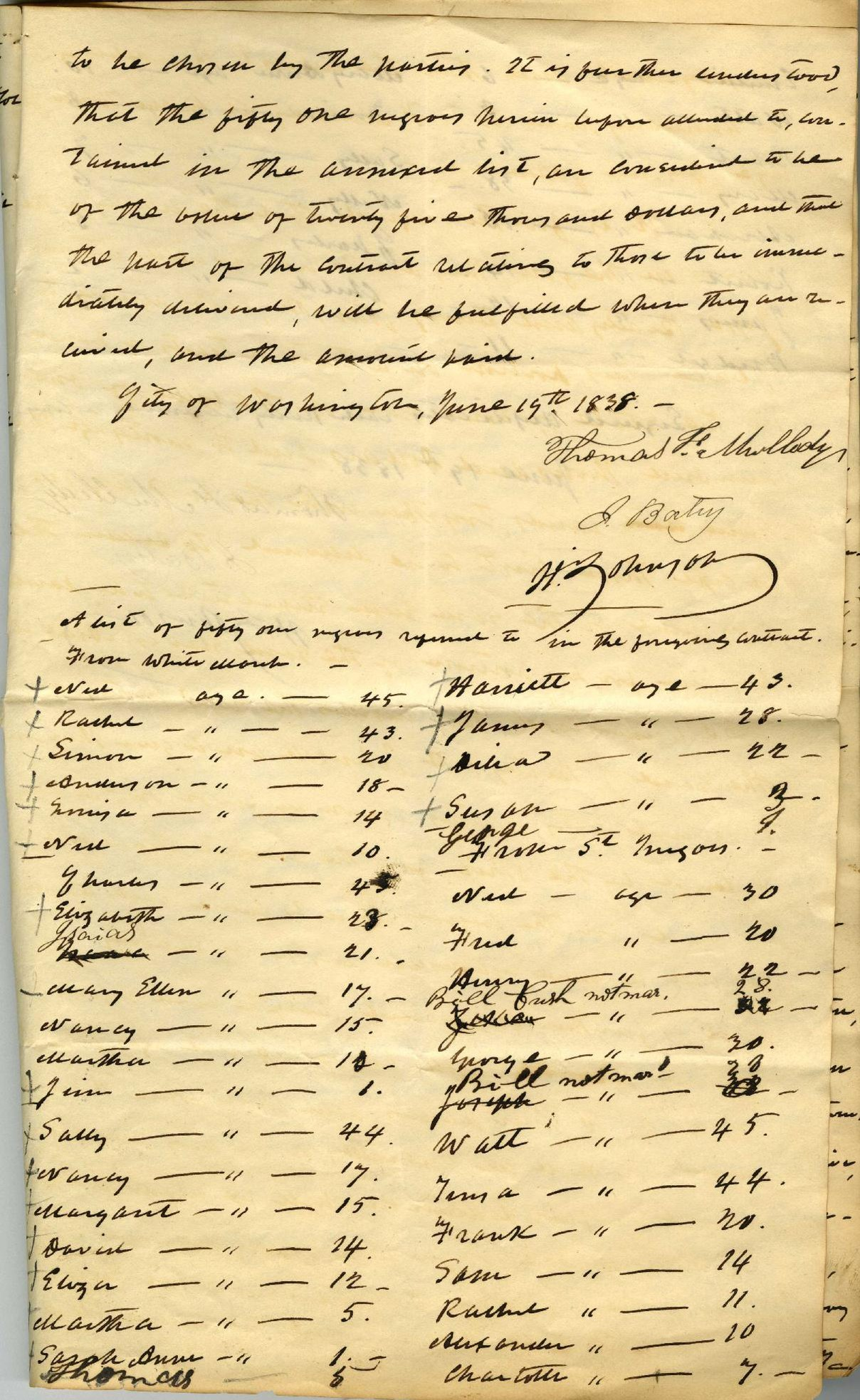
Mulledy's signature on the articles of agreement for the 1838 slave sale

Mulledy's building program left Georgetown College—and, by extension, the Maryland Jesuits—with considerable debt. Compounding the financial insecurity was that the Maryland Jesuits' plantations had been mismanaged and were not generating sufficient income to support the college. To rectify the province's finances, Mulledy, as provincial, sold nearly all the slaves owned by the Jesuit Maryland Province to two planters in Louisiana. This plan had been authorized by the Jesuit Superior General in Rome, Jan Roothaan, in late 1838 on the condition that the slave families not be separated and that they be sold to owners who would allow them to continue in their Catholic faith. Mulledy executed the sale of 272 slaves to Jesse Batey and Henry Johnson on June 19, 1838. Despite Roothaan's order, it soon became evident that families were, indeed, separated.

This sale provoked outcry among many of the province's Jesuits, who were opposed to slaveholding by the Jesuits and supported manumission of the slaves. These Jesuits sent graphic accounts of the sale to Roothaan, who was inclined toward removing Mulledy as provincial superior. William McSherry convinced Roothaan to delay his decision and, along with Samuel Eccleston (the Archbishop of Baltimore), tried to persuade Mulledy to step down. Roothaan even contemplated expelling Mulledy from the Society of Jesus, but was persuaded otherwise by Eccleston. By August 1839, Roothaan ordered McSherry to inform Mulledy that he had been removed, for the twofold reasons of disobeying orders and of promoting scandal.

By the time Roothaan came to this decision, McSherry had already convinced Mulledy to step down in late June and to go to Rome to explain himself to the church authorities. Mulledy resigned the day he received Roothaan's letter. McSherry was made the acting provincial, and was later elected provincial despite being severely ill and near death. Following Mulledy's meeting with Roothaan in Rome, he was assigned to teach English to young boys in Nice in the Kingdom of Piedmont-Sardinia, effectively as censure for his conduct in the slave sale affair. During his exile, Mulledy wrote to Roothaan of his feelings of loneliness and sense of being forgotten.

Mulledy became an alcoholic, and later tried to break this habit with a year of abstinence. With the intensity of the controversy waning, in the winter of 1841 and 1842, the province petitioned Roothaan to allow Mulledy to return to the United States. Roothaan was particularly persuaded by Bishop Eccleston's request for Mulledy's return. Granting the request, Roothaan sent Mulledy to the Diocese of Boston, so as to keep him away from Maryland, where the scandal had taken place.

== College of the Holy Cross ==
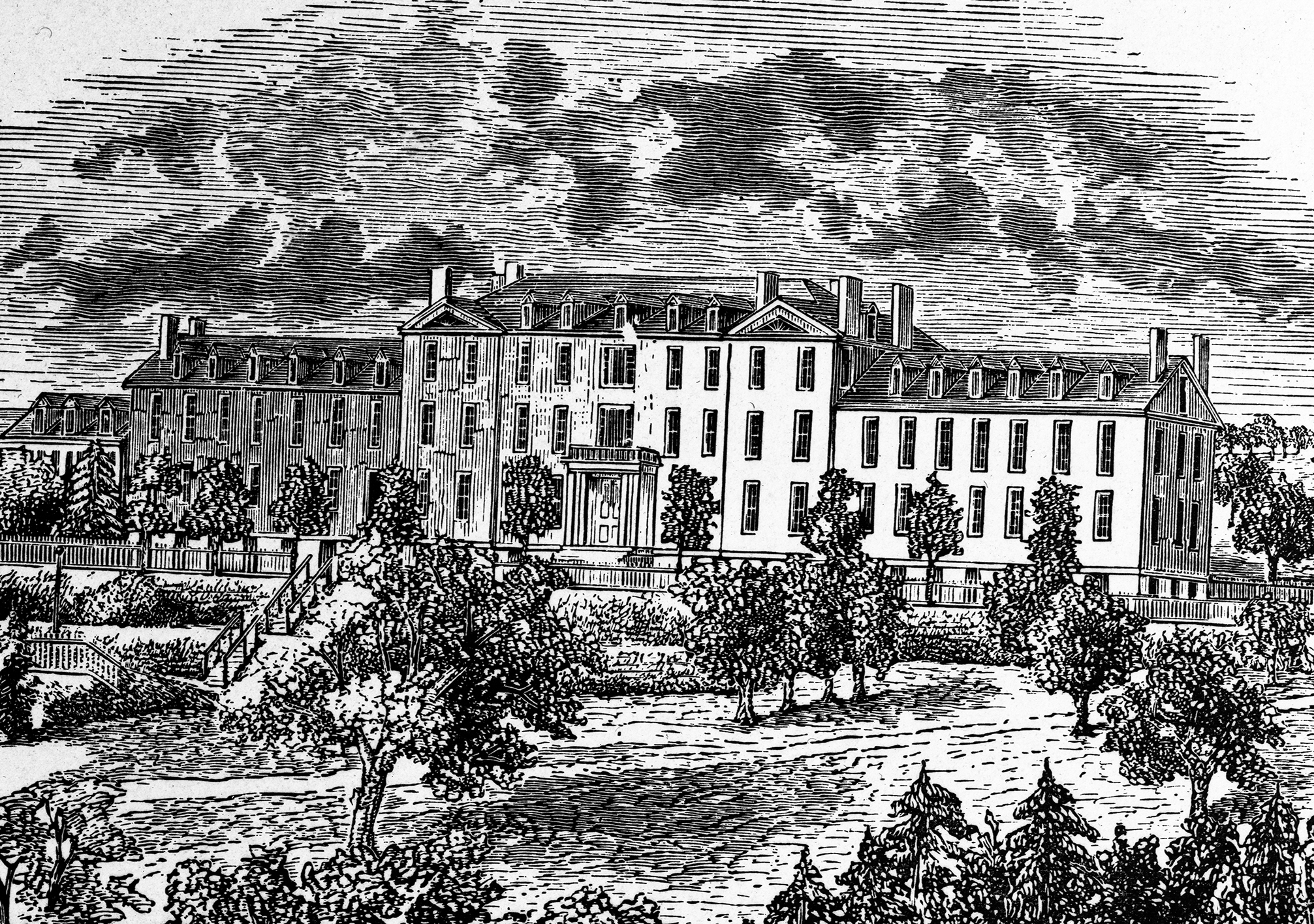
Fenwick Hall was completed in 1844 under Mulledy.

Bishop Benedict Joseph Fenwick of Boston established the College of the Holy Cross in Worcester, Massachusetts, in 1843. Following Roothaan's permission for Mulledy to leave Europe, Fenwick requested that Mulledy be appointed the first president of the college in 1843. Mulledy accepted this position and first arrived at Worcester on March 13, 1843.

He oversaw the construction of the school's first building, whose cornerstone was laid on June 21, 1843. Originally known as the college building, it was later named Fenwick Hall, and was entirely destroyed by fire in 1852. Regularly inspecting progress on the building's initial construction, he eventually moved to Worcester permanently on September 28, 1843. He first lived in a farmhouse at the foot of the hill on which the college was built, along with a Jesuit candidate and a Jesuit brother. The college building was completed on January 13, 1844.

Relations between Mulledy and Fenwick were strained by the fact that Mulledy wished to have independence in deciding to accept candidates for the Jesuit novitiate. Mulledy eventually prevailed on this matter. Moreover, within three months of the college's opening, Mulledy received directions from Fenwick to significantly curtail the college's expenses, admonishing him to exercise greater frugality. He was unable to offset operating costs with tuition fees and other income. In light of steadily increasing enrollment and accompanying overcrowding, the college was greatly aided by a donation of $1,000 (~$32,848 in 2024) from Andrew Carney in March 1844. Given Mulledy's worsening relationship with Fenwick, his presidency came to an end in 1845, and he returned to Georgetown; he was succeeded by James Ryder.

== Later years ==
=== St. John's Literary Institution ===
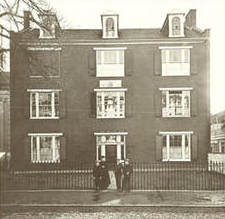
Mulledy was president of St. John's Literary Institution (depicted in 1890).

Mulledy was elected the procurator of the Maryland province in 1847 at the province's general congregation, following heated clashes between himself and his fellow Jesuits, including James Ryder. A Belgian Jesuit, Peter Verhaegen, wrote to Roothaan that Mulledy had been "imperious and despotic," and severely condemned his hostile temperament and breach of fraternity. The new provincial superior, Ignatius Brocard, transferred Mulledy to Philadelphia, where he continued as procurator, before being sent to Frederick, Maryland in 1850 as president of St. John's Literary Institution, succeeding Charles H. Stonestreet. The president of the school also served as the pastor of St. John the Evangelist Church.

Mulledy advocated for an English-only curriculum, rather than teaching classes in Latin, so as to not drive away students into Protestant schools that taught in English. During his tenure, Mulledy enforced very strict discipline, prompting a mass walk-out of the older students in the school. In response, he expelled a majority of them, reducing the once-regional student body to one solely from the city of Frederick. This sent the school into a decline from which it never recovered. Upon the end of his term, Mulledy was succeeded by Burchard Villiger. He then was assigned to Alexandria, Virginia for a short while on a pastoral mission.

=== Ministry ===
In the fall of 1854, Mulledy was again sent to the College of the Holy Cross, where he was made the prefect of studies and spiritual prefect. He remained in this position until 1857. When asked to teach Latin and Ancient Greek, he declined on the grounds that his competence in the subjects had diminished with age. Instead, Mulledy much preferred to deliver sermons, of which he compiled a file. With the rise of the Know Nothing movement across the United States, and the 1854 victory of the party in winning control of the Massachusetts General Court, a Joint Special Committee on the Inspection of Nunneries and Convents was formed to investigate Catholic institutions. A rumor began circulating in July of that year that Holy Cross was being used as a weapons depot for an eventual Catholic revolution. Consequently, the committee arrived in March to investigate the college, and was escorted around the premises by Mulledy. Upon finding no truth to the rumor, they left.

Mulledy once again returned to Washington in 1857, where he served as pastor of Holy Trinity Church in Georgetown until 1858. He then went again to Philadelphia for two years, the latter of which he spent as superior at Saint Joseph's College. Mulledy died of "dropsy" on July 20, 1860, at Georgetown College. (Note: Some sources say he died at Saint Joseph's College in Philadelphia.) He was buried in the Jesuit Community Cemetery on Georgetown's campus.

== Legacy ==
In 2015, controversy arose at Georgetown University over the name of Mulledy Hall due to its namesake's connection with slavery. This resulted in the building being temporarily renamed Freedom Hall. In 2017, the president of the university, John DeGioia, announced that the hall would be permanently renamed Isaac Hawkins Hall, taking the first name listed on the register of slaves sold in 1838.

In similar fashion, Mulledy Hall at the College of the Holy Cross, which opened in 1966, was renamed Brooks–Mulledy Hall in 2016. The intent of this dual name was to retain its recognition of Mulledy as a founder of the college, while simultaneously recognizing John E. Brooks, who worked to racially integrate the campus of Holy Cross in 1968 and who later was its president. However, in 2020, the college removed Mulledy's name from the building and it became Brooks Hall.

== Notes ==
Academic offices
Preceded by John W. Beschter	17th President of Georgetown College; 1829–1837	Succeeded by William McSherry
First	1st President of the College of the Holy Cross; 1843–1845	Succeeded by James A. Ryder
Preceded by Samuel Mulledy	22nd President of Georgetown College; 1845–1848	Succeeded by James A. Ryder
Preceded by Charles H. Stonestreet	4th President of St. John's Literary Institution; 1850–1854	Succeeded by Burchard Villiger
Catholic Church titles
Preceded by William McSherry	2nd Provincial Superior of the Jesuit Maryland Province; 1837–1840	Succeeded by William McSherry
Preceded by –	Vicar General of the Diocese of Boston; 1838–1840	Succeeded by –
Preceded by Charles H. Stonestreet	Pastor of St. John the Evangelist Church; 1850–1854	Succeeded by Burchard Villiger
Preceded by Anthony F. Ciampi	17th Pastor of Holy Trinity Church; 1857–1858	Succeeded by Joseph Aschwanden
