= Francis Dzierozynski =

Polish Jesuit missionary to the United States

The Reverend Francis Dzierozynski

Orders
- Ordination: 1806

Personal details
- Born: Franciszek Dzierożyński; January 3, 1779 Orsha, Russian Empire
- Died: September 22, 1850 (aged 71) Frederick, Maryland, U.S.
- Denomination: Catholic Church

Francis Dzierozynski (born Franciszek Dzierożyński; January 3, 1779 – September 22, 1850) was a Polish Catholic priest and Jesuit who became a prominent missionary to the United States. Born in the town of Orsha, in the Russian Empire (modern-day Belarus), he entered the Society of Jesus and was ordained a priest in 1806. He taught and studied in Polotsk and Mogilev until leading students in an escape from the French invasion of Russia in 1812. He returned to Polotsk, where he taught until the expulsion of the Jesuits from the Russian Empire in 1820. Thereafter, he took up teaching in Bologna, Italy.

The Jesuit Superior General sent Dzierozynski to the United States as a missionary the following year. He was given broad authority over the Jesuits' Maryland Mission, and taught at Georgetown College while learning English. In 1823, he was appointed the superior of the Maryland Mission, with jurisdiction over all the Jesuits in the United States. During his term, he continued teaching at Georgetown, where he was also master of novices. As superior, he reconciled the Society of Jesus and the Corporation of Roman Catholic Clergymen, a holdover from the period of suppression of the Jesuits that owned most of the American Jesuits' property, and oversaw the transition of Saint Louis College into a Jesuit institution. He also was involved in significant disputes with the American bishops, especially Ambrose Maréchal, with whom his quarrel over the ownership of valuable White Marsh Manor, endured for many years and involved such prominent figures as John Quincy Adams, Henry Clay, Roger Taney, Luigi Fortis, and Pope Pius VII.

His term as superior of the mission came to an end in 1830, and Dzierozynski took up other prominent positions in the Maryland Mission. He also resumed teaching and led retreats. He again became leader of the newly elevated Maryland Province in 1839, but his old age and continuing conflicts with bishops and the Superior General resulted in an unsuccessful administration of the province. His term came to an end in 1843, and he spent his final years at the novitiate in Frederick, Maryland, where he died.

== Early life ==
Franciszek Dzierożyński was born on January 3, 1779, in Orsha, in the Russian Empire (located in modern-day Belarus). He enrolled at the Jesuit Collegium in Orsha, before entering the Society of Jesus in 1794, at the age of fifteen. He studied at the novitiate in Polotsk until 1809, but was ordained a priest there in 1806, after studying theology for only one year, due to an insufficient number of priests. He then studied philosophy during his scholastic years, during which he was assigned to teach French, physics, music, and grammar at the Collegium Nobilum in Saint Petersburg.

Upon the completion of his education, he continued teaching philosophy and mathematics at the Jesuit collegium in Mogilev, where he also engaged in pastoral work. He then returned to Polotsk, where he taught Jesuit seminarians and lay students in the Jesuit College. He led a covert escape from the French invasion of 1812, and later returned to the city, resuming his position as a professor of dogmatic theology, apologetics, and homiletics.

== Missionary in America ==
When Czar Alexander I expelled the Jesuits from the Russian Empire in 1820, Dzierozynski left for Italy, where he began teaching in Bologna. There, he developed a friendship with the future cardinal Giuseppe Caspar Mezzofanti, which he maintained throughout his life. He then went to Rome, where he received orders from the Jesuit Superior General, Luigi Fortis, to become a missionary and revive the Society of Jesus in the United States following its worldwide suppression. Dzierozynski's task was to restore the spirit of the Jesuits, improve administration, and expand the apostolate to new areas. Departing with Angelo Secchi from Livorno, the journey took five months, three of which were spent at sea, crossing the Atlantic, and the voyage encountered many perilous storms, before arriving in Philadelphia on November 7, 1821.

=== Teaching and administration ===
Dzyierozynski eventually arrived at Georgetown College in Washington, D.C., on November 12, 1821. Upon his arrival in the United States, he was appointed socius (assistant) and procurator of the Maryland Mission and admonitor to Charles Neale, the superior of the mission. He was met with a community of Jesuits who lived as planters and were highly suspicious of European Jesuits who sought to modify their lifestyle and pastoral approach. Their suspicion was further heightened by the vast authority that Dzierozynski was given. The president of Georgetown College, Benedict Joseph Fenwick, wrote to Fortis, requesting that Dzierozynski's power not be increased; meanwhile, the European-born missionary, John W. Beschter, supported Dzierozynski's attempted reform of the American Jesuits.

At Georgetown, he began learning English, and sought to gain the trust of the young Jesuits by teaching them philosophy in Latin. He was also fluent in French, Italian, and Russian. Though he initially opposed the American view that the Church should be governed in a "republican" fashion, he eventually adopted the American Jesuits' position. The students came to like Dzierozynski, and gave him the nickname of "Father Zero," as they could not pronounce his last name. He became a citizen of the United States in 1828, and believed in civic participation. It was said that he frequently spoke about metaphysics with Vice President John C. Calhoun.

== Leadership of the American Jesuits ==
In April 1823, Dzierozynsi was appointed by the Jesuit Superior General, Luigi Fortis, to succeed Charles Neale as superior of the Jesuit Mission in Maryland. His jurisdiction extended over 95 Jesuits spread from Maryland to New England and as far west as the Mississippi and Missouri River Valleys. He took office at a time of severe mismanagement of the mission. The mission's Maryland plantations, which included slave ownership of some 300 people, were barely breaking even, the novitiate had been effectively closed, and one of its largest institutions, Georgetown College, had a dwindling student body.

Dzierozynski remained a professor at Georgetown, where he also became vice president and treasurer. Within several years, Georgetown's enrollment had recovered. He also reopened the novitiate at Georgetown in 1827, and personally fulfilled the office of master of novices, succeeding Charles Van Quickenborne. As ordered by Fortis, he also addressed a fractured administration of the mission, which was divided between the Society of Jesus itself and the Corporation of Roman Catholic Clergymen, which was established to hold and administer the Jesuits' property during suppression. (Note: The Corporation of Roman Catholic Clergymen of Maryland was incorporated as a civil entity by the Maryland General Assembly in 1792 in response to the suppression of the Society of Jesus in 1773 by Pope Clement XIV. Its purpose was to preserve the property of the former Jesuits with the hope that the Society would be one day restored and the property returned under the ecclesiastical jurisdiction of the Jesuit superior in America. The Jesuits did not want their property to be seized by the state, by the Propaganda Fide (which had exercised jurisdiction over the United States as a mission church since 1776), or by the bishop (whom the Holy See had ordered to take possession of all Jesuit property as part of its suppression). When the Society of Jesus began to be restored in America in 1805 by allowing former Maryland Jesuits to join the Russian Jesuit province, the Corporation endured and expanded for some time, causing friction among those who renewed their Jesuit vows and those who did not. Indeed, even when Pope Pius VII officially restored the Society of Jesus worldwide in 1815, the Corporation continued to add new members, some of whom had never been Jesuits before the suppression. With the Corporation's endurance continued its legal possession of the former Jesuit property, instead of the return of the property to the now-restored Jesuit order.) In May 1825, the Corporation was reluctantly brought under control of the Society (but continued to exist as a legal entity). In 1827, he accepted the invitation of the Bishop of Louisiana and the Two Floridas, Louis Dubourg, to transfer responsibility for Saint Louis College from the diocese to the Jesuits. After visiting the college in Missouri that same year, he sought permission from the superiors in Rome, who approved the transfer in 1829. When the Superior General ordered the Washington Seminary closed, Dzierozynski allowed all the students to transfer to Georgetown free of charge.

He conflicted with the Archbishop of Baltimore, Ambrose Maréchal, over his authority to transfer Jesuit priests among Jesuit parishes in the diocese, a special privilege that had been the right of Jesuit superiors around the world prior to suppression. Maréchal maintained that he could veto any transfer; Fortis concurred, advising Dzierozynski that the papal edict restoring the Jesuits did not include the authority of Jesuit superiors to unilaterally transfer priests within dioceses. Nonetheless, Dzyierozynski argued at the First Provincial Council of Baltimore in 1829 that he possessed this authority. The bishops acquiesced to Dzierozynski's assertion, but Fortis' successor, Jan Roothaan, reprimanded Dzierozynski for contradicting his superior.

Dzierozynski played a role in the establishment of St. John's College in Frederick, Maryland, in 1829. He was relieved of his office in November 1830, when Peter Kenney arrived as an apostolic visitor to investigate the possibility of elevating the Maryland mission to the full status of a province. A future provincial superior, James A. Ryder, credited Dzierozynski with saving the Jesuit mission in the United States.

=== White Marsh dispute ===
Fortis appointed Dzierozynski on the belief that a non-American superior would be best suited to resolve a dispute between the Jesuits and Ambrose Maréchal stemming from disputed terms of an agreement made during the suppression of the Society of Jesus, over ownership of substantial lands in Maryland, especially White Marsh Manor. Maréchal argued that the properties that the Corporation of Roman Catholic Clergymen were gifted were given for the benefit of the whole Church, not just the Jesuits; he also claimed a right to an allowance that the Jesuits had paid to his two predecessors, who were Jesuits (while Maréchal was a Sulpician). The Jesuits denied both of these claims. Maréchal sailed to Rome and obtained a brief from Pope Pius VII in 1822, ordering that the Jesuits transfer the property and slaves thereon to the archbishop. Fortis ordered Dzierozynski to obey the papal brief, but the conflict continued to escalate.

The American Jesuits resisted this proclamation, viewing it as foreign interference with their affairs, which were conducted by the Corporation of Roman Catholic Clergymen, a legally separate entity. Luigi Fortis debated the issue before the Sacred Congregation for the Propagation of the Faith from 1823 to 1826. Maréchal enlisted the support of the Sulpicians' legal counsel, Roger Taney (who later became Chief Justice of the United States). Meanwhile, William Matthews obtained the support of the U.S. Secretary of State, John Quincy Adams, on behalf of the Jesuits, and Dzierozynski enlisted Adams' successor, Henry Clay, to warn Maréchal against foreign interference. The Undersecretary of State, George Ironside, formally notified Maréchal that the President of the United States would not permit a foreign head of state (the pope) to circumvent the American judicial system in resolving a property dispute. The position of the United States government played a substantial role in resolving the dispute.

A compromise was reached in 1826 among the cardinals in Rome, whereby Maréchal would receive a monthly stipend for life from the Jesuit Superior General, and the Jesuits would maintain ownership of the White Marsh plantation. Dzierozynski rejected the claim of Maréchal's successor, James Whitfield, that he and his successors were also due the stipend. The superiors in Rome decided in favor of the archbishop, and directed a final lump payment to be made to Whitfield's successor, Samuel Eccleston. Dzierozynski's successor, Thomas F. Mulledy, paid for this obligation in 1838 by selling the Jesuits' slaves.

== Later life ==
After his term as mission superior, Dzierozynski remained active in the Maryland Mission and later Maryland Province, which was elevated in 1833. He was appointed consultor, and was charged by Kenney with appointing personnel within the province. He remained master of novices at Georgetown until 1831. Dzierozynski then resumed the position on December 16, 1834, at the relocated novitiate in Frederick. He held this role until November 1, 1841. From January 15, 1844, to November 13, 1846, he again became the master of novices, as well as the rector of the St. Stanislaus novitiate in Frederick, succeeding Samuel Mulledy and being succeeded by Samuel Barber. While novice master at Georgetown, he also taught philosophy and theology to the Jesuit scholastics and lay students, until 1837. During the 1840s, he was also tertian master.

In addition to his educational duties, Dzierozynski was spiritual director and retreat director for Jesuits, religious sisters, and female students at Georgetown Visitation Academy and the Visitation Academy of Frederick. Benedict Joseph Fenwick, now the Bishop of Boston, invited him to attend the Second Provincial Council of Baltimore in 1833, but he did not.

=== Vice-provincial superior ===
William McSherry, the provincial superior of the Maryland Province, died in 1839, just six months after being appointed to the office. The Maryland Jesuits selected Dzierozynski to be vice-provincial to manage the province in the interim period. Though Dzierozynski effectively acted in the capacity of a provincial superior, Jan Roothaan declined to elevate him to indicate that the province was on probation for previous scandals. The combination of his old age and the fact that he had fallen ill several days prior to his appointment resulted in a reclusive provincial who left Frederick, Maryland only after being ordered by Roothaan. The Jesuits criticized Dzierozynski as being too passive in governing the province. Likewise, Roothaan admonished him for allowing such behavior among the Jesuits as excessive imbibing of alcohol, celebration of national holidays, and other customs that the European Jesuits did not allow.

Dzierozynski was reluctant to open a new Jesuit college within his jurisdiction, but Fenwick's persistence combined with Roothaan's approval resulted in the opening of the College of the Holy Cross in Worcester, Massachusetts, in 1843. In September of that year, Dzierozynski resigned the office of provincial superior, and was succeeded by James A. Ryder.

=== Final years ===
Dzierozynski returned to the role of master of novices, but after three years, his health further deteriorated and his disagreements with Roothaan mounted, resulting in the end of his tenure. By August 1850, he anticipated that he would soon die, and he received his last rites. His health prevented him from celebrating Mass. He died on September 22, 1850. In accordance with his request, Dzierzynski's body was carried in front of the Visitation Convent in Frederick, where the cloistered nuns mourned it, before being removed for burial. He was described as the most prominent of the early Polish Jesuit missionaries to the United States.

== Notes ==
Catholic Church titles
Preceded by Charles Neale	Superior of the Jesuit Mission in the United States; 1823–1830	Succeeded by Peter Kenney as Apostolic visitor
Preceded by Charles Van Quickenborne	6th Master of Novices of the Jesuit Province of Maryland; 1827–1831	Succeeded by Fidelis Grivel
Preceded by Fidelis Grivel	8th Master of Novices of the Jesuit Province of Maryland; 1834–1841	Succeeded by Samuel Mulledy
Preceded by William McSherry as Provincial Superior	Vice-Provincial Superior of the Jesuit Maryland Province; 1840–1843	Succeeded by James A. Ryder as Provincial Superior
Preceded by Samuel Mulledy	10th Master of Novices of the Jesuit Province of Maryland; 1844–1846	Succeeded by Samuel Barber
Academic offices
Preceded by Samuel Mulledy	3rd Rector of St. Stanislaus Novitiate; 1844–1846	Succeeded by Samuel Barber
