= William McSherry =

American Jesuit priest (1799–1839)

The Very Reverend William McSherry SJ
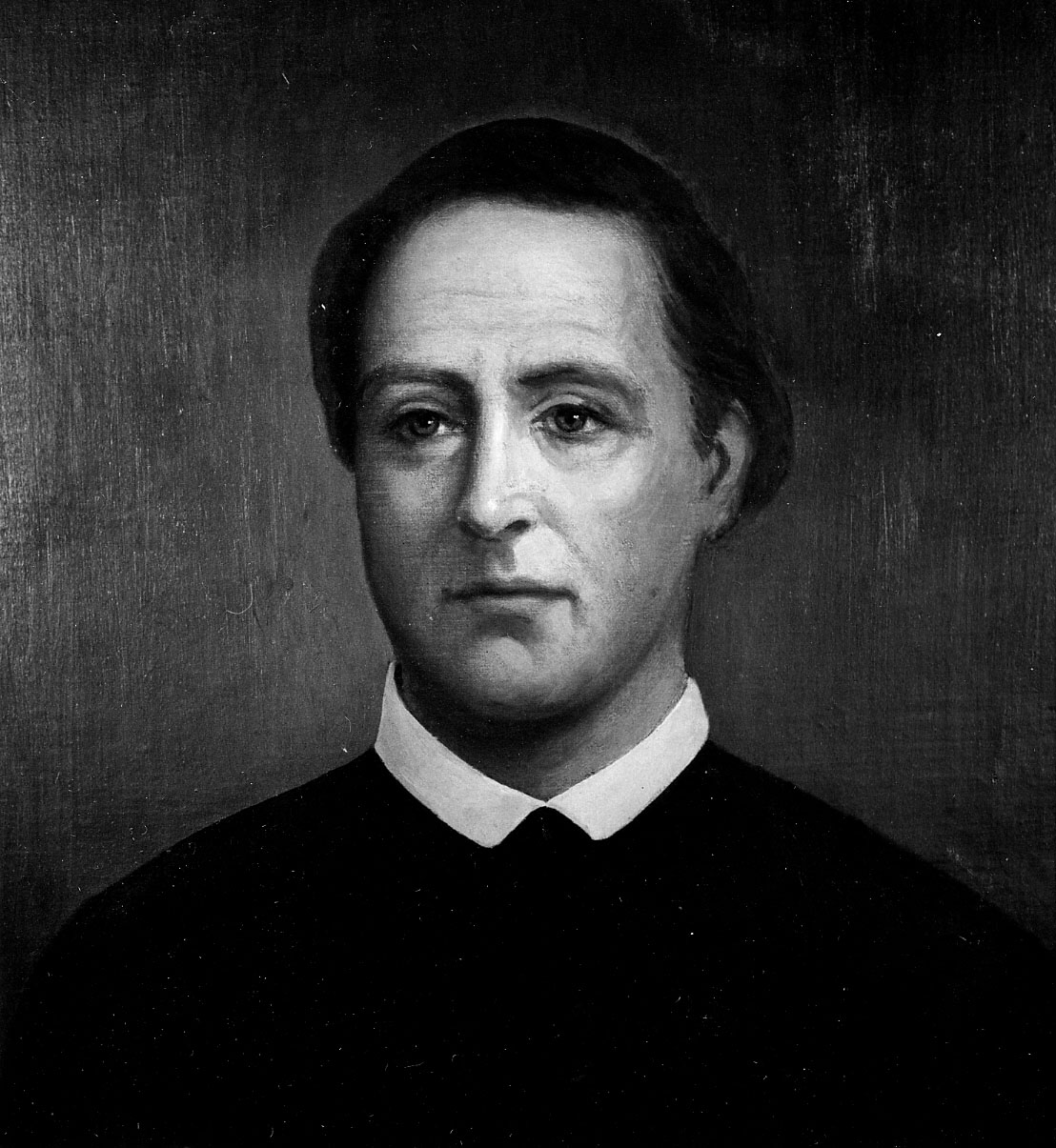
- Portrait of William McSherry

18th President of Georgetown College
- In office 1837–1839
- Preceded by: Thomas F. Mulledy
- Succeeded by: Joseph A. Lopez

Personal details
- Born: July 19, 1799 Charlestown, Virginia, U.S. (Note: At the time, Charles Town, West Virginia was spelled as a single word. It was located in the Commonwealth of Virginia, as the State of West Virginia had not yet been created.)
- Died: December 18, 1839 (aged 40) Georgetown, District of Columbia, U.S. (Note: Georgetown was a separately chartered city within the District of Columbia until the consolidation of the district's governments into a single entity, Washington, D.C., with the Organic Act of 1871.)
- Resting place: Jesuit Community Cemetery
- Education: Georgetown College; Pontifical Gregorian University

William McSherry SJ (July 19, 1799 – December 18, 1839) was an American Catholic priest and Jesuit who became the president of Georgetown College and a Jesuit provincial superior. The son of Irish immigrants, McSherry was educated at Georgetown College, where he entered the Society of Jesus. As one of the first Americans to complete the traditional Jesuit course of training, he was sent to Rome to be educated for the priesthood. There, he made several discoveries of significant, forgotten holdings in the Jesuit archives, which improved historians' knowledge of the early European settling of Maryland and of the language of Indian tribes there.

McSherry became the first provincial superior of the Jesuits' Maryland Province from 1833 to 1837, and laid the groundwork for the sale of the province's slaves in 1838. He then briefly became the president of Georgetown College in 1837, and was simultaneously made provincial superior for a second time in 1839, despite suffering illness to which he would succumb several months later.

== Early life ==
William McSherry was born on July 19, 1799, in Charlestown, Virginia (today part of West Virginia), to Anastasia "Anne" Lilly and Richard McSherry. He was named after his father's twin brother. His father was born in St. John's Point in County Down, Ireland and had emigrated to the United States in the 1780s, after a prosperous stint in commerce in Jamaica; upon settling in the United States, he purchased an estate—naming it "Retirement"—and became a farmer of tomato, okra, and fruit. McSherry's mother was also of Irish ancestry, and met Richard in the United States, where they married on July 31, 1791.

Following his two older brothers, William enrolled at Georgetown College in Washington, D.C., on November 6, 1813, and entered the Society of Jesus at Georgetown as a novice on February 6, 1815. He was then sent to Rome to study philosophy and theology in June 1820, alongside five other young Jesuits who would go on to hold prominent positions within the American Jesuit order; they were: Thomas Mulledy, Charles Constantine Pise, James Ryder, John Smith, and George Fenwick. In Rome, he was ordained a priest, likely in 1825 or 1826.

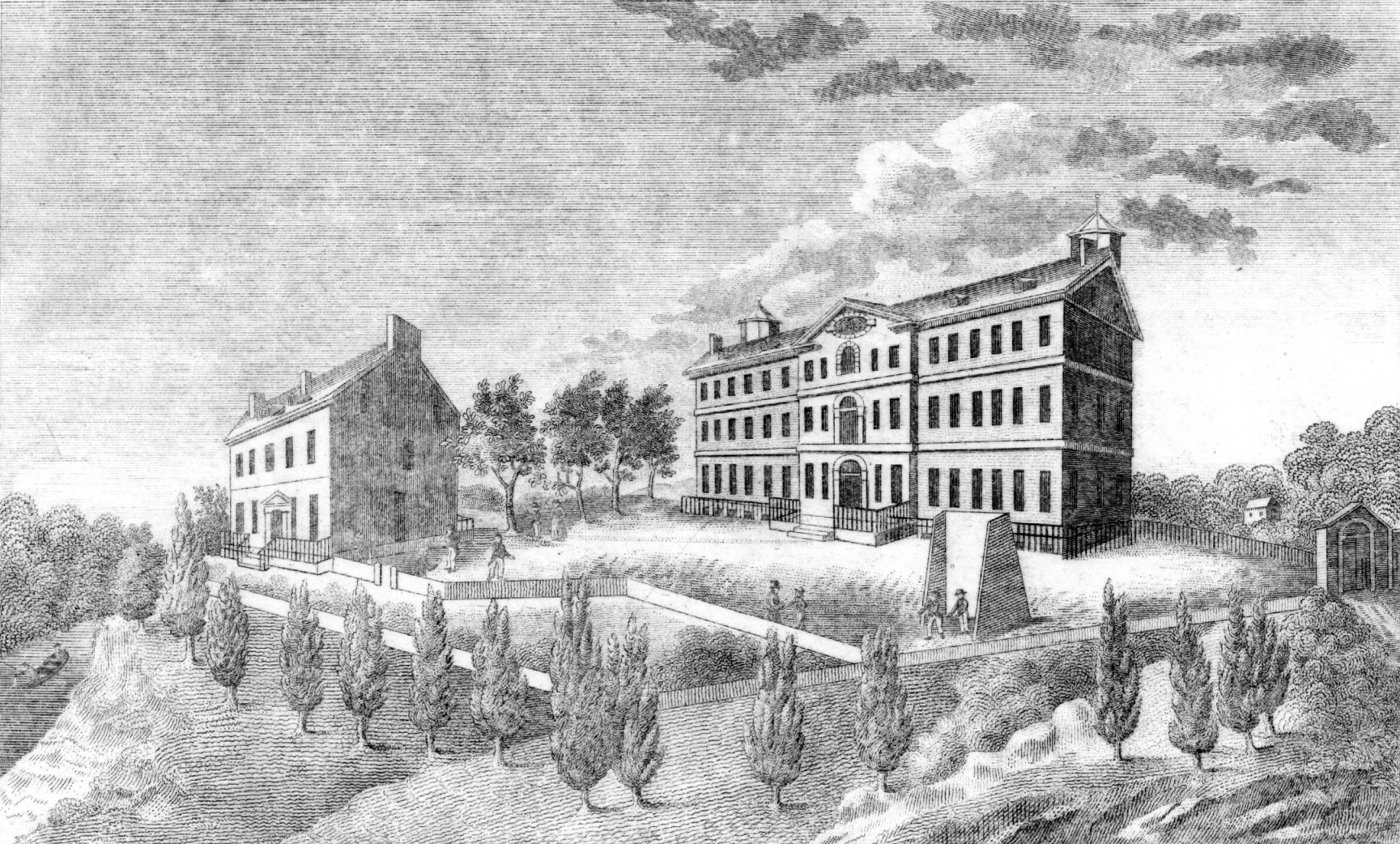
Georgetown College in 1829

While in Rome, McSherry discovered in the Jesuit archives the previously forgotten Relatio Itineris by Andrew White, which is the most comprehensive account of the journey of the Ark and the Dove, and published it. He also rediscovered manuscripts in the archives which contained the only extant writings of the Indian tribes of Maryland. He spent time at the Pontifical Gregorian University, before being appointed the minister of the literary and medical colleges of the Collegio del Carmine in Turin, whose rector was Jan Roothaan, where he remained from 1826 to 1828.

Eventually, McSherry left Livorno for the United States on a treacherous voyage that lasted 171 days, and caused some in the United States to fear that the three Jesuits aboard had perished. He arrived at Georgetown on December 22, 1828. The following year, he became a professor of humanities at Georgetown, and was named the minister for the school, procurator, and consultor one year later. He also served as a professor of theology during this time, and as head of the lower classes. From October 1831 to June 1832, he was appointed the socius (assistant) to Peter Kenney, who was the apostolic visitor to the Jesuits in St. Louis and the Missouri Valley. McSherry was recalled to Rome in 1832, where he professed his solemn vows to the Jesuit order, making him one of the first American Jesuits to complete the traditional Jesuit course of training.

== Maryland provincial ==
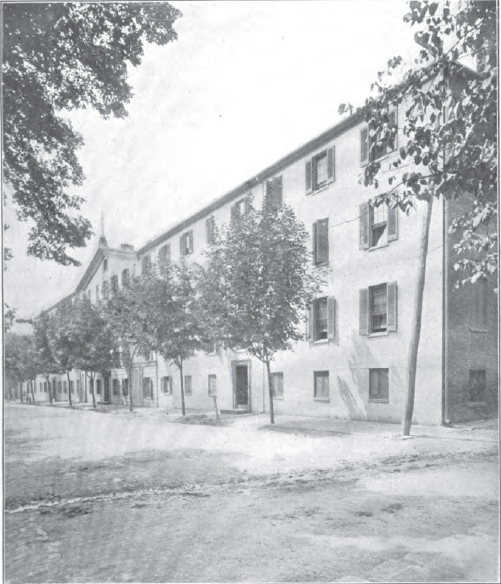
St. Stanislaus Novitiate in Frederick was established in 1833.

On August 14, 1832, McSherry was elected the first procurator of the Jesuit mission in the United States; soon thereafter, Kenney requested that the Jesuit Superior General elevate the mission to the status of a province. This request was granted on August 28, and McSherry set sail for Rome from New York City so he could receive instructions on how to establish the new province. The territory of the new province was defined according to the borders of the state of Maryland, and the province was officially established on February 2, 1833.

On February 7, 1833, McSherry was made the first provincial superior of the Maryland Province of the Society of Jesus. He officially assumed the position on July 8, 1833, but was soon confronted with a considerable debt that Georgetown College had accrued, as well as disciplinary issues within the institution. At the same time he was provincial, McSherry was also pastor of St. Ignatius Church at St. Thomas Manor from 1834 to 1837.

As provincial, McSherry advocated for the relocation of the Jesuit novitiate from Georgetown to Frederick, Maryland because this would reduce expenses, which were of great concern because the novitiate was in significant debt as well; although this relocation was not complete until after his term ended, the first efforts at relocation were made during this time, so that St. Stanislaus Novitiate had a presence in Frederick by 1833.

By the end of his tenure, the province's schools were under strain due to a lack of Jesuits to staff them. Despite this, the province operated several missions throughout rural Maryland, Virginia, and Pennsylvania, whose successes were largely attributed to McSherry. In order to support them, McSherry unsuccessfully sought to obtain the Superior General's approval to sell some of the Jesuits' land and farms in 1835, which totaled 13,500 acres (5,500 hectares) across Maryland by 1837. The Second Provincial Council of Baltimore in 1833 entrusted to the province a new mission to the freed blacks who had returned to Liberia. However, the already-shorthanded province was unable to perform the task. The province's financial difficulties were further compounded by the fact that the farms, worked by slaves, had become unprofitable. As a result, McSherry and Mulledy together impressed upon the provincial congregation of 1835 the need to sell the province's slaves.

=== Slave sale ===
In 1836, McSherry and the province's leadership were seriously considering selling all the nearly-300 slaves who remained under the ownership of the Maryland Province. A formal assessment of the moral and economic advantages and disadvantages of the proposed sale was drawn up by Stephen Larigaudelle Dubuisson. The financial concerns become acute due to the increasing unprofitability of the farms and the growing debt accrued by Georgetown's recent construction projects.

After the leadership returned a vote of six to four in favor of sale, the Superior General Jan Roothaan approved the transaction on October 27, 1836, on the condition that the purchasers guarantee the right of the slaves to practice their Catholic faith, that their families not be separated, and that those who were old or ill be allowed to remain with the Jesuits and be cared for. During this period, McSherry began to experience symptoms that later proved to be stomach cancer, and was occasionally unable to discharge his office.

Following his requests to be relieved of the office, Roothaan permitted his resignation in October 1837. Thomas Mulledy replaced McSherry as provincial superior, and McSherry assumed Mulledy's role as the president of Georgetown. In addition to McSherry's petitions, this swap was motivated by Roothaan's dissatisfaction with McSherry's failure to keep him apprised of the province's affairs—which was largely due to his worsening illness—and his lack of confidence in Mulledy's administrative abilities. Due to the panic of 1837, the sale was not executed until the following year. In total, 272 slaves were sold to Jesse Batey and Henry Johnson of Louisiana on June 19, 1838, and much outrage within the Jesuit order over the morality of the sale ensued; this outrage was reflected also by Roothaan, whose orders on which the sale was conditioned were not followed.

== Georgetown College ==
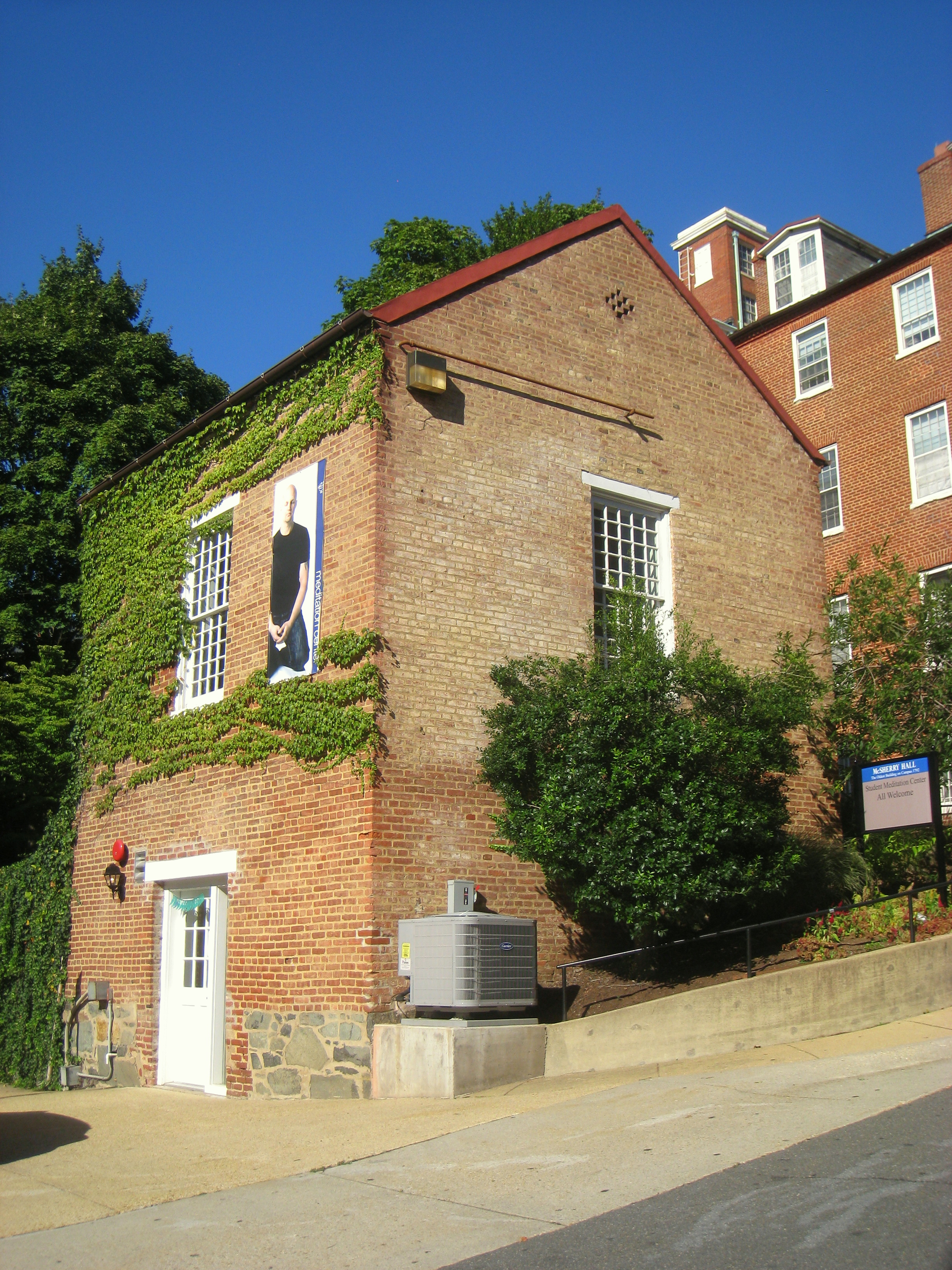
McSherry Hall was renamed Anne Marie Becraft Hall in 2017.

McSherry was appointed the president of Georgetown College, and despite suffering from cancer, entered office on December 25, 1837. He inherited a large debt of almost $48,000, (approximately $1.38 million in 2024) accrued during the presidency of his predecessor. McSherry reduced the debt by increasing enrollment and eliciting a large donation, reducing it to a still-significant, but more manageable, $24,000. In 1839, Roothaan ordered McSherry to suspend Mulledy from his duties as provincial superior due to fallout over the slave sale scandal. After Mulledy left to answer to the authorities in Rome, the Maryland Jesuits elected McSherry, who was still the president of Georgetown, provincial superior for a second time. Roothaan, unaware of McSherry's greatly debilitated and pain-ridden state, confirmed the appointment.

=== Death and legacy ===
In 1839, McSherry was permitted to resign the presidency due to his rapidly worsening health. He was succeeded by Joseph A. Lopez. By November of that year, McSherry had become bedridden, and on December 18, he died. Francis Dzierozynski succeeded him as interim provincial. The painful tumor in his stomach was discovered during an autopsy, which was performed because the physicians of the time did not understand the cause of his death. He was buried in the Jesuit Community Cemetery at Georgetown.

McSherry Hall at Georgetown University was temporarily renamed Remembrance Hall in 2015 over the namesake's involvement in the 1838 slave sale. In 2017, university president John DeGioia announced that the building would be given the permanent name of Anne Marie Becraft Hall.

== Notes ==
Academic offices
Preceded by Thomas F. Mulledy	18th President of Georgetown College; 1837–1839	Succeeded by Joseph A. Lopez as Acting President
Catholic Church titles
New office	1st Provincial Superior of the Jesuit Maryland Province; 1833–1837	Succeeded by Thomas F. Mulledy
Preceded by Francis Neale	12th Pastor of St. Ignatius Church; 1834–1837	Succeeded by Aloysius Mudd
Preceded by Thomas F. Mulledy	3rd Provincial Superior of the Jesuit Maryland Province; 1839	Succeeded by Francis Dzierozynski as Vice-Provincial Superior
