= Mulledy =

Mulledy is a surname of Irish origin. Notable people with the surname include:

- Samuel Mulledy (1811–1866), American Jesuit and president of Georgetown University, brother of Thomas
- Thomas F. Mulledy (1794–1860), American Jesuit and president of Georgetown University
