= James A. Ryder =

19th-century American Jesuit

The Very Reverend James A. Ryder SJ
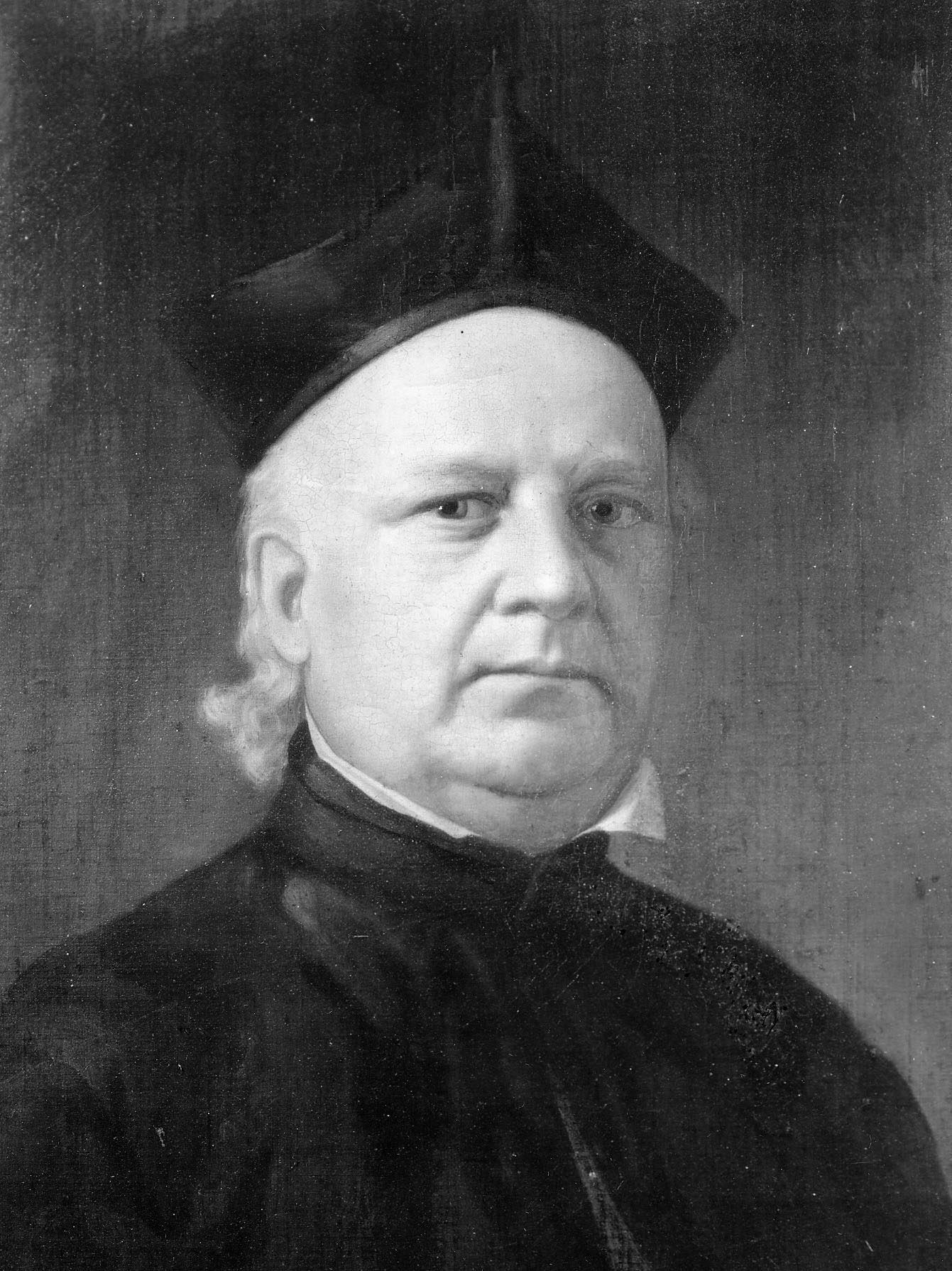

2nd President of Saint Joseph's College
- In office 1856–1857
- Preceded by: Felix-Joseph Barbelin
- Succeeded by: James A. Ward

20th & 23rd President of Georgetown College
- In office 1848–1851
- Preceded by: Thomas F. Mulledy
- Succeeded by: Charles H. Stonestreet
- In office 1840–1845
- Preceded by: Joseph A. Lopez
- Succeeded by: Samuel Mulledy

2nd President of the College of the Holy Cross
- In office 1845–1848
- Preceded by: Thomas F. Mulledy
- Succeeded by: John Early

Personal details
- Born: October 8, 1800 Dublin, Ireland
- Died: January 12, 1860 (aged 59) Philadelphia, Pennsylvania, U.S.
- Resting place: Jesuit Community Cemetery
- Education: Georgetown College

Orders
- Ordination: 1824

James A. Ryder SJ (October 8, 1800 – January 12, 1860) was an American Catholic priest and Jesuit who became the president of several Jesuit universities in the United States. Born in Ireland, he immigrated with his widowed mother to the United States as a child, to settle in Georgetown, in the District of Columbia. He enrolled at Georgetown College and then entered the Society of Jesus. Studying in Maryland and Rome, Ryder proved to be a talented student of theology and was made a professor. He returned to Georgetown College in 1829, where he was appointed to senior positions and founded the Philodemic Society, becoming its first president.

In 1840, Ryder became the president of Georgetown College, and oversaw the construction of the university's Astronomical Observatory, as well as Georgetown's legal incorporation by the United States Congress. He earned a reputation as a skilled orator and preacher. His term ended in 1843 with his appointment as provincial superior of the Jesuit Maryland Province. As provincial, he laid the groundwork for the transfer of ownership of the newly established College of the Holy Cross from the Diocese of Boston to the Society of Jesus. Two years later, Ryder became the second president of the College of the Holy Cross, and oversaw the construction of a new wing. He returned to Georgetown in 1848 for a second term as president, and accepted a group of local physicians to form the Georgetown School of Medicine, constructed a new home for Holy Trinity Church, and quelled a student rebellion.

In his later years, Ryder went to Philadelphia, where he assisted with the founding of Saint Joseph's College and became its second president in 1856. He became the pastor of St. John the Evangelist Church in Philadelphia, and then transferred to St. John the Evangelist Church in Frederick, Maryland, as pastor. Finally, he returned to Philadelphia, where he died in 1860.

== Early life ==
James Ryder was born on October 8, 1800, in Dublin, Kingdom of Ireland, to a Protestant father, who died when his son was a child, and a Catholic mother. He emigrated to the United States as a young boy with his mother after the death of his father. She took up residence in Georgetown, then a city in the newly formed District of Columbia. Ryder enrolled at Georgetown College on August 29, 1813, and entered the Society of Jesus in 1815 as a novice, at the age of fifteen. He began his novitiate in White Marsh Manor in Maryland, before being sent to Rome in the summer of 1820 by Peter Kenney, the apostolic visitor to the Jesuit's Maryland mission.

He was sent alongside five other American Jesuits, who would go on to become influential in the administration of the Society in the United States for several decades. Among these, Ryder and Charles Constantine Pise were identified as the most intellectually advanced. They left from Alexandria, Virginia, on June 6, 1820, and landed in Gibraltar to be quarantined, before traveling to Naples on July 13 and then on to Rome in late August, where Ryder studied theology and philosophy.

There, he was ordained a priest in 1824, and proceeded to teach theology at the Roman College. He then went to teach theology and sacred scripture at the University of Spoleto, where he remained for two years. He became a good friend of Archbishop Giovanni Mastai-Ferretti (later Pope Pius IX), who appointed him the chair of philosophy. Ryder also spent part of 1828 teaching in Orvieto.

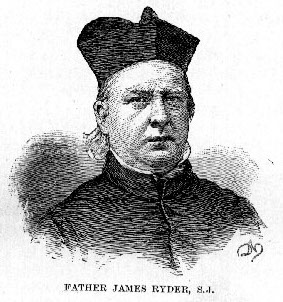
Ryder wearing a priest's biretta

Ryder returned to the United States in 1829, where he took up a professorship in philosophy and theology at Georgetown, to teach Jesuit scholastics. He was named the prefect of studies, where he implemented an overhaul of the curriculum under the direction of President Thomas F. Mulledy; he was simultaneously made vice president of the school. It was during this time that Ryder founded the Philodemic Society, of which he became the first president.

Founded on January 17, 1830, it was the first collegiate debating society in the United States, and it was Ryder who selected the name. He was also appointed by Peter Kenney as minister and admonitor to Mulledy. In this role, he received a severe lecture from Kenney in 1832 for not properly welcoming six Belgian Jesuits who arrived at the college. In 1834, Ryder became a professor of rhetoric at the university.

In an 1835 speech to Catholics in Richmond, Virginia, he called upon Catholics to defend national unity, which included opposing the efforts of Northern abolitionists to abolish slavery in the South; he warned Catholics that they would themselves become victims of persecution if their "glorious system of national independence" were to be overthrown. The group gathered resolved that "slavery in the abstract" was evil, but that Catholic citizens were obligated to support the civil institutions of the United States. However, they also celebrated "the determination [of] our Southern brethren, in not condescending to discuss the question of slavery with those [Northern] fanatics."

== Georgetown College ==
=== First presidency ===
The appointment of Ryder as president of Georgetown College was announced on May 1, 1840. His selection came despite concerns that he was more interested in giving talks and leading retreats than ensuring the institution was financially stable. Although he had the support of the Jesuit leadership, the Superior General of the Jesuits, Jan Roothaan, was worried that Ryder's American attitude in support of republicanism would take priority over his obedience to the Jesuits.

Succeeding Joseph A. Lopez, he entered office while the Provincial Council of Baltimore was in progress, and the council fathers who were gathered in Baltimore took the opportunity to visit Georgetown. As president, Ryder's connections with Washington's politicians were strong. He had a particularly good relationship with the President of the United States, John Tyler, who enrolled his son at Georgetown, and whose sister converted to Catholicism. Their relationship went so far that Ryder played a significant role in the unsuccessful attempt to have Tyler run as a Democrat in the 1844 presidential election.

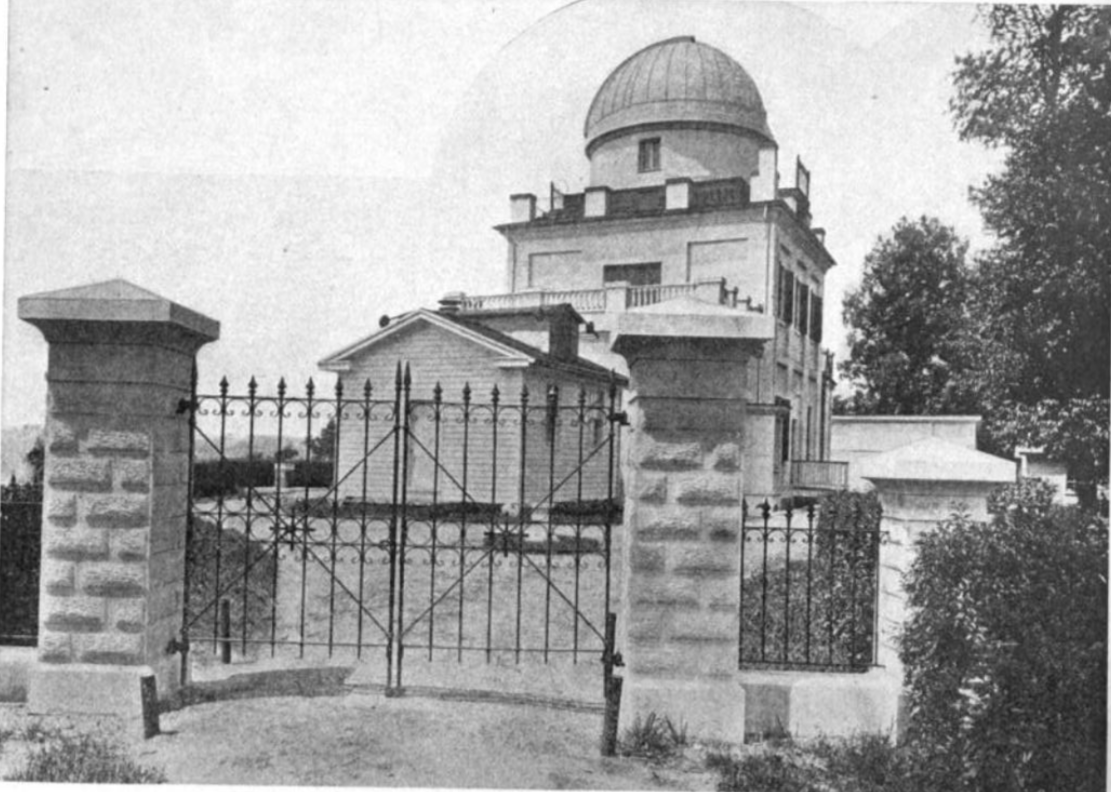
The Georgetown College Astronomical Observatory was constructed during Ryder's presidency.

Upon assuming the presidency, Ryder inherited a significant debt of $20,000 (equivalent to $650,000 in 2025), which he liquidated by 1842, at least part of it being paid by Ryder himself from monies he earned lecturing. Ryder had gained a reputation for talent in preaching, which he did without notes. This was particularly admired by Archbishop Samuel Eccleston, and Roothaan cited it as a source of many conversions to Catholicism.

Word of his preaching reached President James Buchanan, who would attend his sermons and who received private instruction in Catholicism from him. Eventually, Ryder was described as the most well-known Catholic preacher in antebellum America. Twice during his presidency stones were thrown at him in the streets of Washington, one of these incidents occurring on April 26, 1844, as he was returning from the Capitol Building, where he had presided over the funeral of Representative Pierre Bossier. Such anti-Catholic aggression was the outgrowth of the Know Nothing movement in the United States.

Ryder oversaw the establishment of the Georgetown College Observatory in 1842, a project spearheaded by James Curley. The opening of the observatory attracted several renowned Jesuit scientists from Europe who were fleeing the Revolutions of 1848. Moreover, the College of the Holy Cross was established in Worcester, Massachusetts, in 1843, and Ryder sent Jesuits from Georgetown to teach there, while graduates of the new college received a degree from Georgetown until it was independently chartered by the Massachusetts General Court. Through having been recognized by the United States Congress in 1815, the university, as the President and Directors of Georgetown College, was officially incorporated by an act of Congress in 1844, and Ryder was named as one of the five members of the corporation. His term came to an end on January 10, 1845, when he was succeeded by Samuel A. Mulledy.

=== Second presidency ===
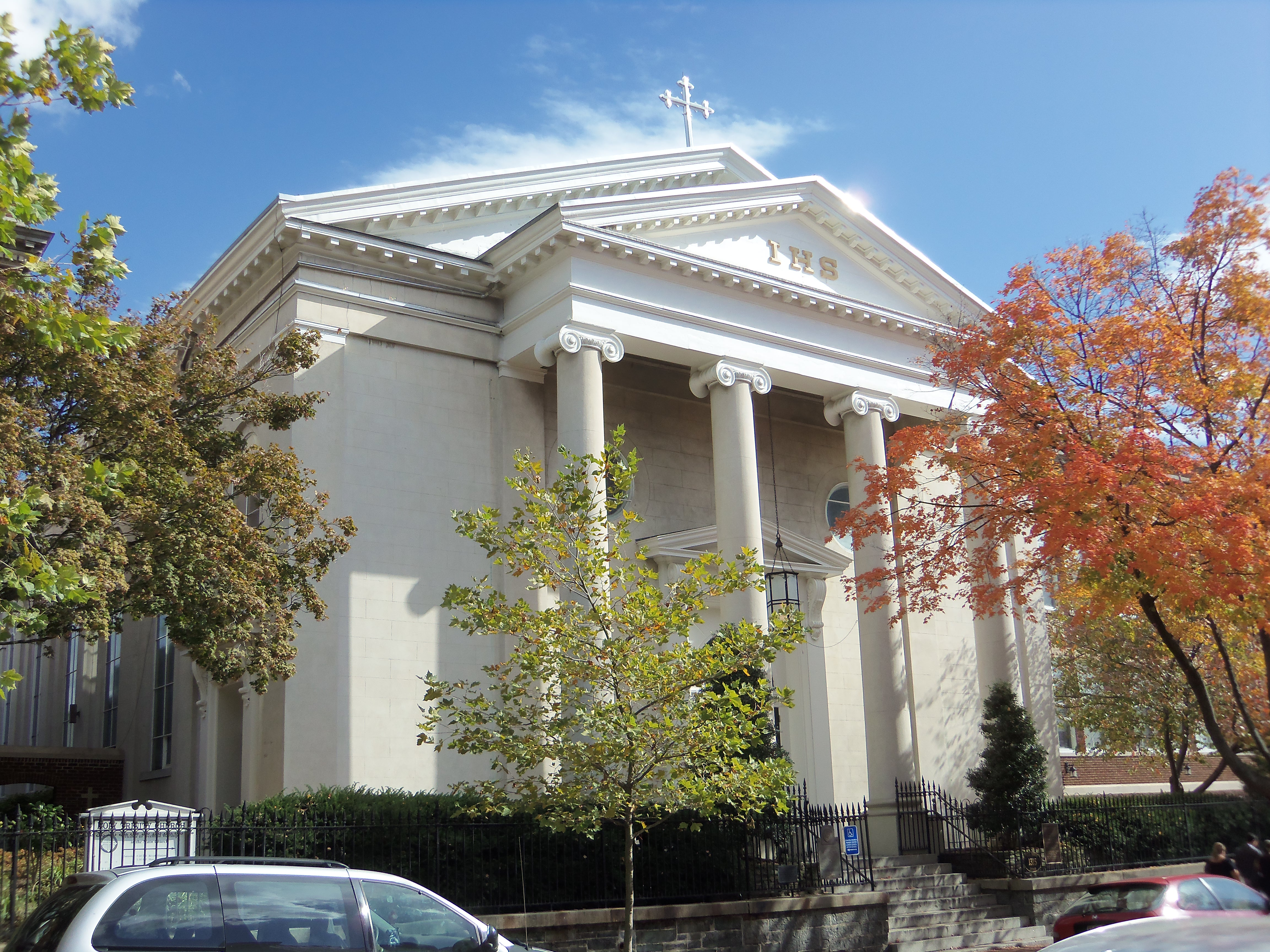
Ryder oversaw construction of the new Holy Trinity Church in Georgetown.

In 1848, Ryder was appointed president of Georgetown for a second time, replacing Thomas Mulledy. His first act was to build a new edifice for Holy Trinity Catholic Church in the Georgetown neighborhood, which was then located on college property. He also implemented his fervent support for temperance by prohibiting students from consuming alcohol on or off campus, and eventually applied this ban to the Jesuits as well. This unpopular policy was accompanied by a ban on smoking.

In the fall of 1849, Ryder was approached by four physicians who had been excluded from the Washington Infirmary and established a new medical faculty. They asked that their faculty be incorporated into Georgetown as its medical department, creating the first Catholic medical school in the United States. Ryder accepted the proposition within a week, giving rise to the Georgetown College School of Medicine. He appointed the four petitioners as the first professors of the school on November 5, 1849, and the first classes were held in May 1851.

A rebellion broke out among the students in 1850. It began when members of the Philodemic Society held a meeting one day, in defiance of the prefect's order to the contrary. Ryder, who frequently left the college to preach, had been away for several weeks on a preaching tour. In response, the prefect suspended the society's meetings for one month. Upset at this decision, several members refused to perform their nightly reading at the refectory, and later threw stones in the dormitory. When Ryder returned, he expelled three students. One of these entered the refectory that night and incited the students to insurrection, who stormed a Jesuit's room. Forty-four of the students abandoned the college for downtown Washington and wrote Ryder that they would not return until the three were re-admitted and the prefect replaced. With the students' hotel bills mounting and going unpaid, Ryder convinced them to return to the college and quit the rebellion. He later replaced the prefect with Bernard A. Maguire.

Later that year, Ryder presided over the marriage of William Tecumseh Sherman and Eleanor Boyle Ewing. His presidency came to an end in 1851, and Ryder was replaced by Charles H. Stonestreet.

== Maryland provincial ==
In September 1843, while president of Georgetown, Ryder was appointed the provincial superior of the Maryland Province of the Society of Jesus, with the strong support of his predecessor, Francis Dzierozynski. Ryder voiced support that the Jesuits should sell their parochial property, leaving this to diocesan priests, to instead focus on education in cities.

At the same time, the Bishop of Boston, Benedict Joseph Fenwick, had become concerned with the cost of operating the newly established College of the Holy Cross. Therefore, he encouraged Ryder to accept ownership of the school on behalf of the Society of Jesus. The Superior General, Roothaan, delegated this decision to Ryder, who was initially hesitant to accept the college. By 1844, Ryder had privately decided to agree to the transfer, but this was not communicated to Fenwick and the deal formally struck until 1845 by Ryder's successor.

Ryder delegated much of his responsibility, though he remained in charge. He held the post until 1845; Jan Roothaan believed the province had to be put under the control of a European to rectify the compounding scandal and mismanagement that had begun under Thomas Mulledy. To that end, he was replaced by Peter Verhaegen of Belgium.

== College of the Holy Cross ==
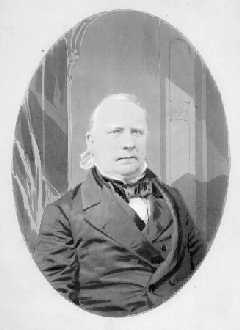
Photograph of Ryder

After his first presidency at Georgetown ended in 1845, Ryder went to Rome to clear his name in light of suspicions of his relationship with a woman who had exchanged letters with him. He traveled to Rome in January by way of New York City and France. In Italy, he recruited eight Jesuits to join him in the United States. One of these was a future president of the College of the Holy Cross, Anthony F. Ciampi. Upon Ryder's return, suspicions continued, despite his defense that the correspondence involved only spiritual counseling, but they finally ceased following Roothaan's order in 1847 that the correspondence end.

Upon returning to the United States, he was appointed by Bishop Fenwick as president of the College of the Holy Cross on October 9, 1845, succeeding the school's first president, Thomas F. Mulledy. As president, he oversaw the construction of an east wing at the college, in accordance with the original plan for the school, which contained a dining room, chapel, study hall, and dormitory. This wing was the only part of the school spared by a subsequent fire in 1852. In 1846, he saw to the burial of the founder of the institution, Fenwick, in the college cemetery, pursuant to his wishes. The number of students increased during his administration.

Ryder clashed with Thomas Mulledy during Mulledy's election as procurator of the Jesuits' Maryland province. As a result, he praised Ignatius Brocard's decision not to send Mulledy back to the College of the Holy Cross, where Mulledy was greatly disliked. The lack of discipline among the Jesuits at Holy Cross drew the commentary of both the Bishop of Boston, John Bernard Fitzpatrick, and Roothaan, who were particularly concerned with the propensity for drinking among the priests. Upon the end of his standard three-year term, Ryder was succeeded by John Early on August 29, 1848, and he returned to Georgetown.

== Later years ==
=== Saint Joseph's College ===
In 1851, he moved to Philadelphia, where he assisted in the founding of Saint Joseph's College. He was made the pastor of St. John the Evangelist Church on September 30, 1855, when he replaced Richard Kinahan to become the first Jesuit in this position, and remained until he was succeeded by John McGuigan on October 4, 1858.

In the meantime, he was appointed the president of Saint Joseph's College in 1856, following its first president Felix-Joseph Barbelin. Ryder sought to relocate the college from Willings Alley to the existing school building at St. John's, which would involve the transfer in ownership of the pro-cathedral from the Diocese of Philadelphia to the Jesuits; the diocese was unwilling to entertain this offer.

In light of the ongoing Know Nothing movement, Ryder was referred to for some time as "Doctor Ryder" rather than "Father Ryder". He also wore layman's clothes, such as a bow tie rather than a Roman collar, in accordance with the orders of Charles Stonestreet, the Maryland provincial, that the Jesuits should not wear their clerical attire. Ryder's tenure lasted only until 1857 before he was succeeded by James A. Ward. He was forced to resign the presidency due to his deteriorating health, though his likeness endures in the form of a gargoyle of Barbelin Hall.

=== Pastoral work ===
Because of his oratorical skills, Ryder was sent to raise money for St. Joseph's College in California in 1852, where he raised $5,000 (equivalent to $190,000 in 2025). While there, he fell ill, and briefly went to Havana, Cuba, and then to the Southern United States, where he recuperated for several months. He was then stationed at St. Joseph's until 1856, when he was made the rector of St. John the Evangelist Church in Frederick, Maryland.

In 1857, he was transferred to Alexandria, Virginia, to do pastoral work, and he returned to Philadelphia in 1859 as spiritual prefect at St. Joseph's College. Ryder died on January 12, 1860, in the rectory of Old St. Joseph's Church in Philadelphia, following a brief illness. His body was transported back to Georgetown to be buried in the Jesuit Community Cemetery.

Academic offices
Preceded by Joseph A. Lopez as Acting President	20th President of Georgetown College; 1840–1845	Succeeded by Samuel Mulledy
Preceded by Thomas F. Mulledy	2nd President of the College of the Holy Cross; 1845–1848	Succeeded by John Early
Preceded by Thomas F. Mulledy	23rd President of Georgetown College; 1848–1851	Succeeded by Charles H. Stonestreet
Preceded by Felix-Joseph Barbelin	2nd President of Saint Joseph's College; 1856–1857	Succeeded by James A. Ward
Catholic Church titles
Preceded by Francis Dzierozynski as Vice-Provincial Superior	4th Provincial Superior of the Jesuit Maryland Province; 1843–1845	Succeeded by Peter Verhaegen
Preceded by Richard Kinahan	Pastor of the Church of St. John the Evangelist; 1855–1858	Succeeded by John McGuigan
