= Samuel Mulledy =

American Jesuit priest (1811–1866)

The Reverend Samuel Mulledy SJ
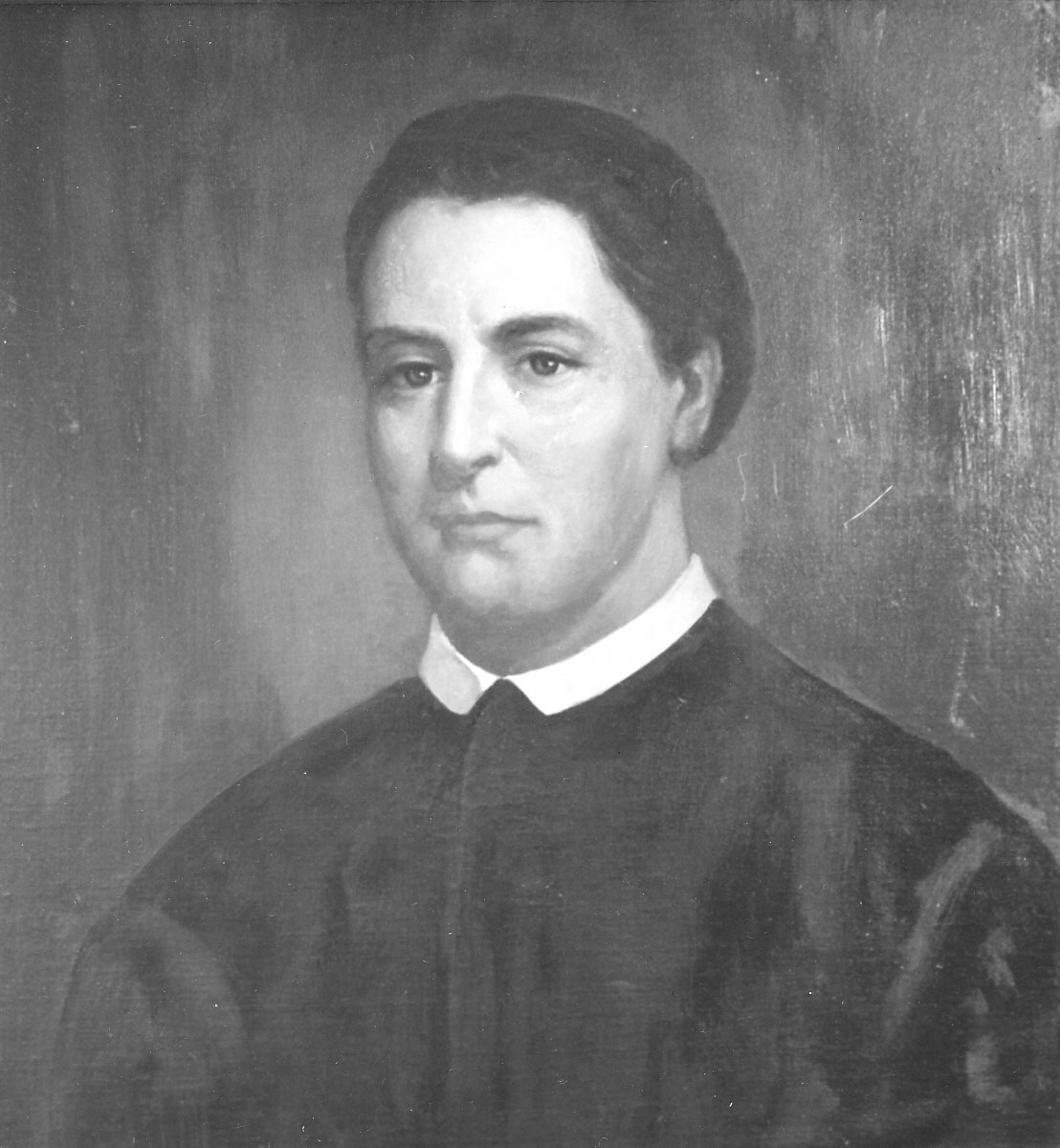
- Portrait of Samuel Mulledy

21st President of Georgetown College
- In office January 10, 1845 – September 6, 1845
- Preceded by: James A. Ryder
- Succeeded by: Thomas F. Mulledy

Personal details
- Born: March 27, 1811 Romney, Virginia, U.S. (Note: At the time, Romney was located in the Commonwealth of Virginia, as the State of West Virginia had not yet been created.)
- Died: January 8, 1866 (aged 54) New York City, U.S.
- Resting place: Fordham University Cemetery
- Relations: Thomas F. Mulledy (brother)
- Education: Georgetown College; Sant'Andrea al Quirinale; Roman College

Orders
- Ordination: 1840

Samuel A. Mulledy SJ (/mʌˈleɪdi/ muh-LAY-dee; March 27, 1811 – January 8, 1866) was an American Catholic priest and Jesuit who served as president of Georgetown College in 1845. Born in Virginia, he was the brother of Thomas F. Mulledy, who was a prominent 19th-century Jesuit in the United States and a president of Georgetown. As a student at Georgetown, Samuel was one of the founding members of the Philodemic Society, and proved to be a distinguished student, which resulted in his being sent to Rome to complete his higher education and be ordained to the priesthood. Upon his return to the United States, he became the master of novices at the Jesuit novitiate in Maryland, before being named president of Georgetown. He sought to be relieved of the position after only a few months, and returned to teaching and ministry.

Mulledy was expelled from the Society of Jesus over charges of alcoholism in 1850. He took up ministerial work at congregations throughout the northeastern United States, remaining at each for no more than a few years. He eventually became chaplain to Archbishop John Hughes and was assigned as an assistant at the Church of St. Lawrence O'Toole in New York City (later known as St. Ignatius Loyola), where he became pastor in 1863 and lived out the remainder of his life. On his deathbed, he petitioned the Jesuit provincial superior to allow him to be readmitted to the Society; four days before his death, his request was granted and he professed his vows.

== Early life ==
Samuel A. Mulledy was born on March 27, 1811, in Romney, Virginia (today located in West Virginia). His father, Thomas Mulledy, was a farmer and a Catholic of Irish descent. His mother, Sarah Cochrane, was from Virginia and was not Catholic. So the two could marry, they obtained a canonical dispensation, and agreed that their sons would be raised Catholic, while their daughters would be raised Protestant. Samuel's brother, Thomas F. Mulledy, was 17 years older than him, and also became a Jesuit and the president of Georgetown College.

=== Education ===
At a young age, Samuel became a teacher with his brother at the Romney Academy. He then began his studies at Georgetown College in 1829, paying his own way like his brother. He paid some of his tuition in kind, in the form of two horses. At Georgetown, he became a co-founder and the first vice president of the Philodemic Society, which held its first meeting on September 25, 1830, and he signed its constitution. At the commencement of 1831, he received the class medal for rhetoric and mathematics, and an honorable mention in French; he also delivered an address in French. His brother was president of the college throughout Samuel's studies. Completing his secular education, Samuel sought admission to the Society of Jesus. His application was approved and, on August 29, 1831, he entered the Jesuit novitiate in White Marsh Manor in Maryland, where he completed his probationary period and took his simple vows.

He was then sent to the novitiate at Sant'Andrea al Quirinale in Rome, being chaperoned across the Atlantic Ocean by William McSherry. Mulledy was sent to Rome for his higher studies because of his academic talent, so that he would be well educated and return to the United States to teach. In total, he studied in Rome for seven years, including at the Roman College, where he garnered a reputation as a distinguished student, and was selected to give a public defense of theology. Mulledy was then ordained a priest in Rome in 1840, and made his "grade" (Note: The culmination of a Jesuit scholastic's philosophical and theological studies was the examen ad gradum, which tested knowledge of doctrine.) in the Society of Jesus.

== Academic career ==
Mulledy then returned from Europe and on November 1, 1841, he was appointed the master of novices of the Jesuits' Maryland Province. He succeeded Francis Dzierozynski, and on January 15, 1844, he was succeeded by Dzierozynski. In 1844, he was made minister of Georgetown College.

=== Georgetown College ===
Mulledy became the president of Georgetown College on January 10, 1845, when James A. Ryder was recalled to Rome. He was young for a holder of the position, but was known as a talented scholar. He assumed the office reluctantly, and his short-lived tenure was generally uneventful. The entire college attended the inauguration of President James K. Polk in 1845, and upon the request of the Mayor of Georgetown, the college students marched in the parade commemorating President Andrew Jackson on July 1 of that year. Soon after taking office, he requested to be relieved, and he was succeeded by his brother, Thomas Mulledy, on September 6, 1845.

== Later life ==
=== Drifting years ===
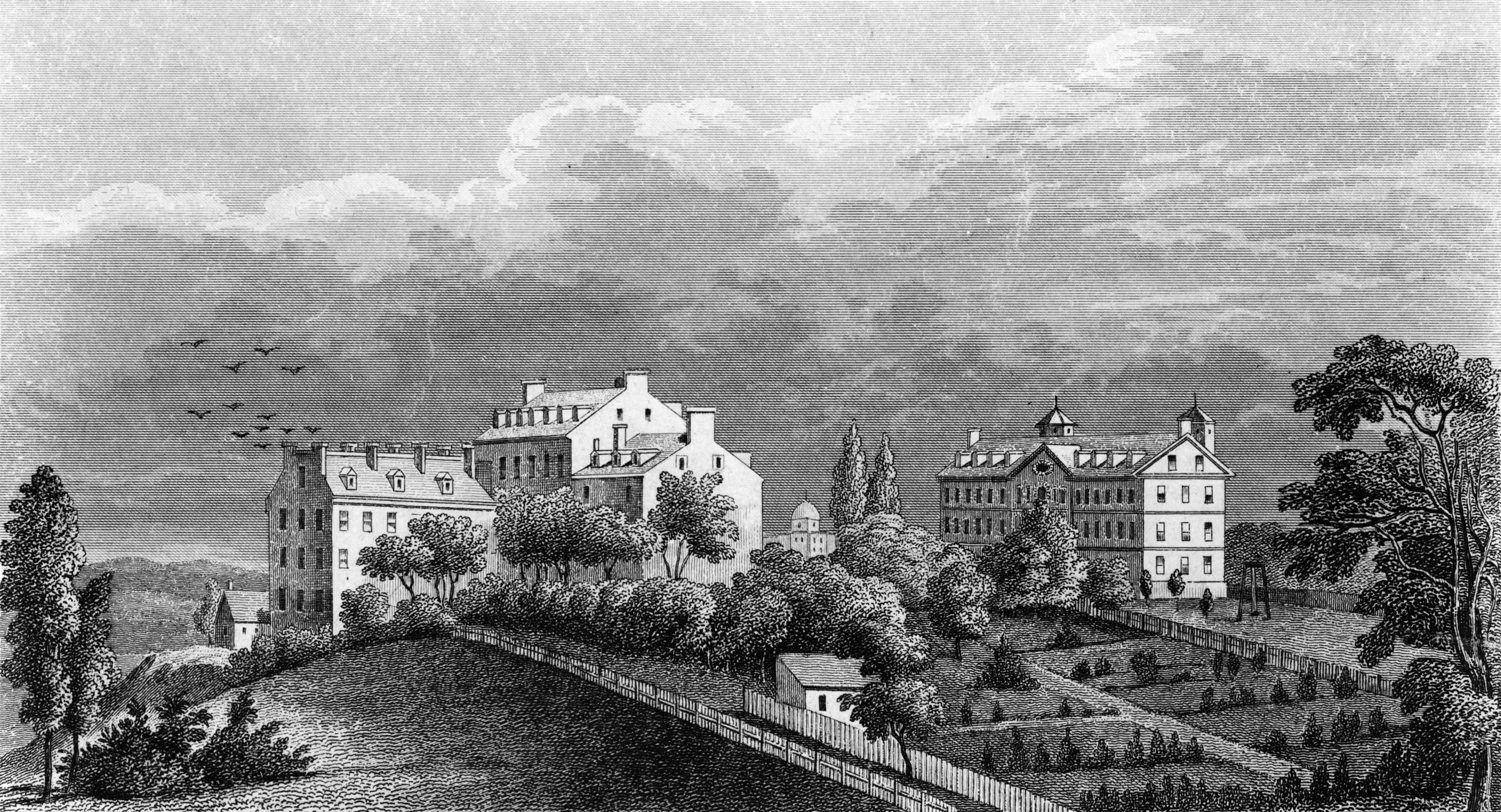
Georgetown College shortly after Mulledy's time there

Following the end of his presidency, Mulledy returned to missionary work, being stationed at St. Joseph's Church in Philadelphia. However, he continued to remain involved at Georgetown as a member of its board of directors from 1846 to 1848.

From 1847 to 1848, he was a professor of dogmatic theology at Georgetown, and subsequently taught rhetoric there. Eventually, Mulledy became an alcoholic, which resulted in his dismissal from the Society of Jesus in 1850. Following his expulsion, he was transferred from city to city, staying only briefly in each. He first was stationed at the original Cathedral of the Holy Cross in Boston for two years, then worked in the Diocese of Albany from 1852 to 1853. The following year, he was sent to the Cathedral of St. James in Brooklyn, where he remained until 1855. He was a professor of rhetoric and mathematics at the College of the Holy Cross in Worcester, Massachusetts, during the 1856–57 academic year. He then was assigned to the Church of Sts. Peter and Paul in South Boston and St. Mary's Church in Yonkers, New York, in 1859 and 1860, respectively.

=== Church of St. Lawrence O'Toole ===
In July 1861, Mulledy was assigned by Archbishop John Hughes as an assistant to Walter J. Quarter, who was pastor of the Church of St. Lawrence O'Toole in New York City (later known as the Church of St. Ignatius Loyola). Mulledy was also the chaplain to Archbishop Hughes. Shortly before his death, Quarter sent a letter to the vicar general for the Archdiocese of New York requesting that Mulledy be appointed as his successor. Following Quarter's death, Mulledy, who was still recovering from his alcoholism, became the pastor of the Church of St. Lawrence O'Toole in 1863. During his first year, he had as an assistant priest W. Coyle, and James Hassan assisted him during his later years.

Mulledy was well-liked by the congregation there, and he founded a chapter of the Society of Saint Vincent de Paul, to increase the charitable work of the parish. He was known for traveling around the parish with his large, black Newfoundland dog, which was both his pet and protection against stray dogs. Traveling for his ministry became difficult because of asthma, as well as an enlarged aorta in 1865. He ceased his ministry on Christmas Day of that year.

He was the last secular pastor of the church. On his deathbed, he was attended by several Sisters of Charity, and John Early, the president of Georgetown, frequently inquired about his health. He supplicated the provincial superior, Angelo M. Paresce, to allow him to be re-admitted to the Jesuit order. When he received word that his request was granted on January 4, 1866, Mulledy leapt out of bed and pronounced the Jesuit formula on his knees, renewing his religious vows.

Mulledy died in New York on January 8, 1866. His body was escorted by a large crowd from the Harlem Bridge up to St. John's College (later Fordham University) in the Bronx, where he was buried in the College Cemetery. Since Mulledy was once again a Jesuit at the time he died in office, Archbishop John McCloskey decided to transfer administration of the parish to the Jesuits, at Mulledy's request. His successor was the Jesuit priest Victor Beaudevin.

== Notes ==
Catholic Church titles
Preceded by Francis Dzierozynski	9th Master of Novices of the Jesuit Province of Maryland; 1841–1844	Succeeded by Francis Dzierozynski
Preceded by Walter J. Quarter	3rd Pastor of the Church of St. Lawrence O'Toole; 1863–1866	Succeeded by Victor Beaudevin
Academic offices
Preceded by James A. Ryder	21st President of Georgetown University; 1845	Succeeded by Thomas F. Mulledy
