= Superior (hierarchy) =

Position at a higher level in the hierarchy

In a hierarchy or tree structure of any kind, a superior is an individual or position at a higher level in the hierarchy than another (a "subordinate" or "inferior"), and thus closer to the apex.

== General ==
A superior generally has the power to approve or deny requests from subordinates, within the scope of the relevant organization. The superior may control the careers of subordinates; for instance, they may have the authority to give raises or promotions.

Superiors are given sometimes supreme authority over others under their command. When an order is given, one must follow that order and obey it or punishment may be issued.

== By organization ==
Superiors in different organizations may have different titles, roles, and responsibilities.

=== Business ===
In business, superiors are people who are supervisors.

=== Military ===
In the military, superiors are people who are higher in the chain of command (superior officer).

=== Catholic Church ===
A religious superior is the person to whom a cleric is immediately responsible under canon law. For monks, it would be the abbot (or the abbess for nuns); for friars, it would be the prior, or, for Franciscans, the guardian (custos), for Minims, the corrector; for diocesan priests, it would be the local bishop. In religious orders with a hierarchy above the local community, there will also be superiors general and possibly provincial superiors above the local abbot, prior, or Mother superior. The priest in charge of a mission sui iuris is called an ecclesiastical superior.

== See also ==
- Seniority
