= District of Columbia Organic Act of 1871 =

Act of Congress

- Long title: An Act to provide a Government for the District of Columbia
- Nicknames: District of Columbia Organic Act of 1871
- Enacted by: the 41st United States Congress

Citations
- Statutes at Large: 16 Stat. 419

Legislative history
- Signed into law by President Ulysses S. Grant on February 21, 1871

The District of Columbia Organic Act of 1871 is an Act of Congress that repealed the individual charters of the cities of Washington and Georgetown and established a new territorial government for the whole District of Columbia. Though Congress repealed the territorial government in 1874, the legislation was the first to create a single municipal government for the federal district. Direct rule by Congress continued until the 1973 passage of the District of Columbia Home Rule Act, a century later.

== History ==
Evolution of the District's internal boundaries

The passage of the Residence Act in 1790 created a new federal district that would become the capital of the United States. Formed from land donated by the states of Maryland and Virginia, the capital territory already included two large settlements at its creation: the port of Georgetown, Maryland and the town of Alexandria, Virginia. A new capital city named in honor of President George Washington was founded to the east of Georgetown in 1791.

Shortly after establishing operations in the new capital, Congress passed the Organic Act of 1801, which organized the federal territory. The territory within the federal district east of the Potomac formed the new County of Washington, which was governed by a levy court consisting of seven to eleven Justices of the Peace appointed by the president, and was governed by Maryland law as of 1801. The area west of the river became Alexandria County which was governed by Virginia law. In addition, Congress allowed the cities of Washington, Alexandria and Georgetown to each maintain their own municipal governments. In 1846 Alexandria County was returned by Congress to the state of Virginia.

The outbreak of the American Civil War in 1861 led to notable growth in the capital's population due to the expansion of the federal government and a large influx of emancipated slaves. By 1870, the District's population had grown 75% to nearly 132,000 residents. Growth was even more dramatic within the County of Washington, where the population more than doubled as people escaped the crowded city.

The individual local governments within the District were insufficient to handle the population growth. Living conditions were poor throughout the capital, which still had dirt roads and lacked basic sanitation. The situation was so bad that some lawmakers in Congress even suggested moving the capital out further west, but President Ulysses S. Grant refused to consider the proposals.

== Effect ==
Instead, Congress passed the Organic Act of 1871, which revoked the individual charters of the cities of Washington and Georgetown and combined them with Washington County to create a unified territorial government for the entire District of Columbia. The new government consisted of an appointed governor and 11-member council, a locally elected 22-member assembly, and a board of public works charged with modernizing the city. The Seal of the District of Columbia features the date 1871, recognizing the year the District's government was incorporated.

The Act did not establish a new city or city government within the District. Regarding a city of Washington, it stated that "that portion of said District included within the present limits of the city of Washington shall continue to be known as the city of Washington". In the present day, the name "Washington" is commonly used to refer to the entire District, but DC law continues to use the definition of the city of Washington as given in the 1871 Organic Act.

In 1873, President Grant appointed an influential member of the board of public works, Alexander Robey Shepherd, to the post of governor. Shepherd authorized large-scale municipal projects, which greatly modernized Washington. In doing so however, the governor spent three times the money that had been budgeted for capital improvements, bankrupting the city. In 1874, Congress replaced the District's quasi-elected territorial government with an appointed three-member Board of Commissioners. Direct rule by Congress continued until the 1973 passage of the District of Columbia Home Rule Act, a century later.

== Conspiracy theories ==
The Act is the basis of several claims held by the sovereign citizen movement. According to these, the Act made the District, and consequently the whole United States, into a business corporation. These claims stem from a misunderstanding of the term municipal corporation used in the Act. There are many kinds of corporations; a corporation is any group authorized to legally act as a single entity; in this case, an incorporated, organized district of the United States. Most U.S. cities and counties are municipal corporations.

This was later used by QAnon supporters to falsely claim that former president Donald Trump would be sworn in as the 19th president of the "original United States" on March 4, 2021. This date corresponds to the original presidential inauguration date because they claimed the Twentieth Amendment was not passed by the "original" United States, and is therefore invalid.

== See also ==
- District of Columbia Organic Act of 1801
- History of Washington, D.C.
- District of Columbia home rule
