= Jesuits in the United States =

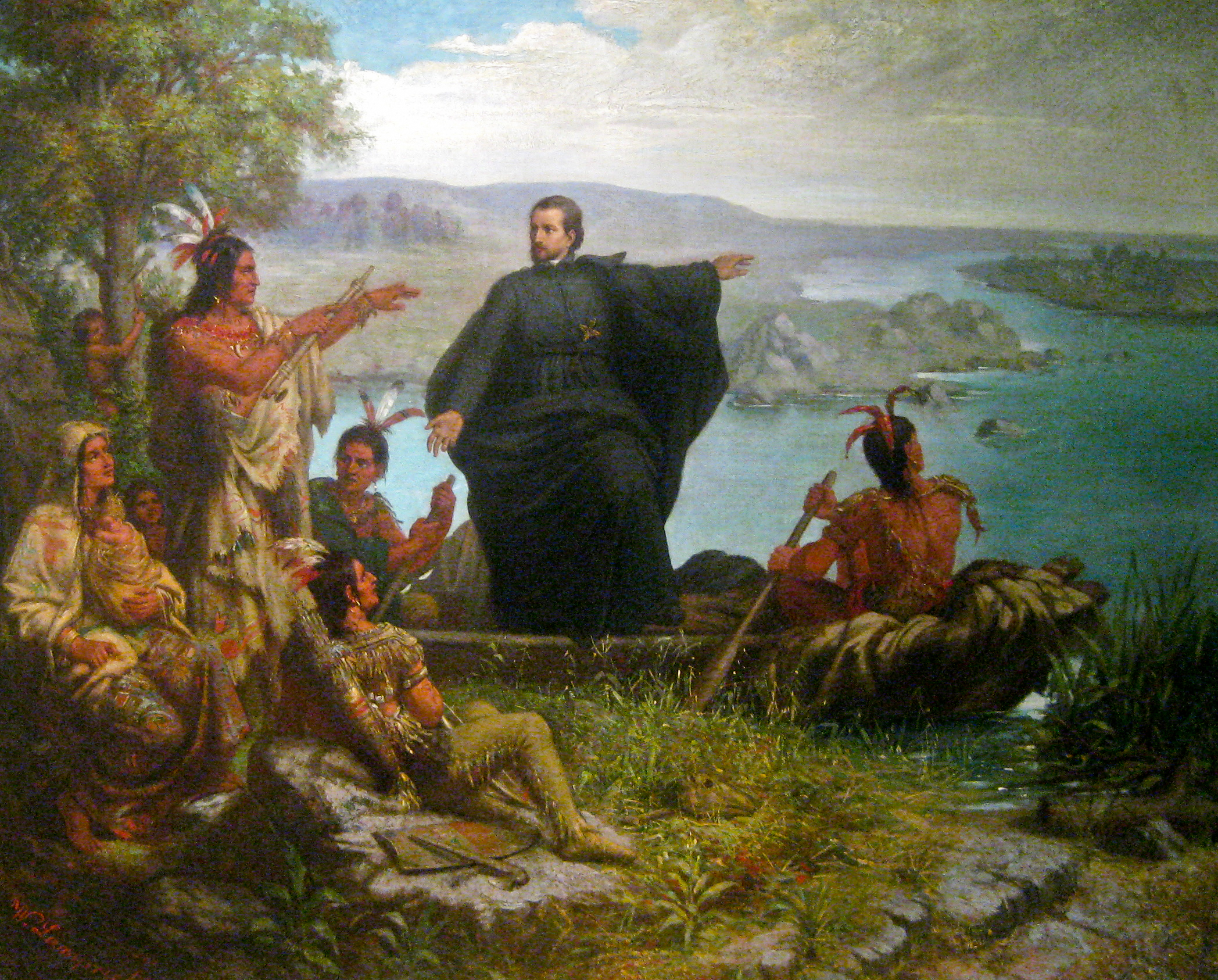
Jacques Marquette, pioneer missionary to Native Americans

The Jesuits in the United States constitute the American branch of the Society of Jesus and are organized into four geographic provinces — East, Central and Southern, Midwest and West — each of which is headed by a provincial superior. The order is known, historically, for its missions to the Native Americans in the early 17th century, for owning and participating in the Atlantic slave trade, and, contemporarily, for its network of colleges and universities across the country.

== Missions to the Indians ==
Most of the Jesuit missions to North America were located in today's Canada, but they explored and mapped much of the west. French missionaries Père Marquette and Louis Jolliet were the first Europeans to explore and chart the northern portion of the Mississippi River, as far as the Illinois River.

Peter De Smet was a Belgian Jesuit active in missionary work among the Plains Indians in the mid-19th century. His extensive travels as a missionary were said to total 180,000 miles. He was known as the "Friend of Sitting Bull" because he persuaded the Sioux war chief to participate in negotiations with the United States government for the 1868 Treaty of Fort Laramie.

== Early American history (18th to 19th centuries) ==
It was a crime for Jesuits to enter Colonial Massachusetts, but none were known to be present there. There were about two dozen Jesuits in the Thirteen Colonies in 1760, and they kept a low profile.

Jesuit John Carroll (1735–1815), who was technically unaffiliated due to the Suppression of the Society of Jesus, became the first Catholic bishop in the young republic, which prevented him from officially rejoining the order when it was reestablished in 1814. He founded Georgetown College in 1789, and it remains a pre-eminent Jesuit school.

Stephen Larigaudelle Dubuisson, S.J. (1786–1864) was sent by the Jesuits from France to the United States in 1816–1826. He served in several parishes and colleges in the Maryland-Pennsylvania area, the center of Catholicism in the new nation. He was not a success as the head of Georgetown College, but otherwise was highly energetic and generally successful. In 1826 he was recalled to Rome, where he became effectively in charge of all Jesuits in the United States, as the advisor on American affairs to the head of the Society. He handled fund-raising, appointments, and setting general policies.

The American Jesuits were restored in 1804, and intellectually reflected the English Enlightenment, emphasizing reasonableness of faith, the right of individual conscience, private devotion, and active participation in the political life of the Republic. In Europe, by contract, the Jesuits were restored in 1814, as part of the Bourbon reaction against the French Revolution. The restored order "resisted intellectual innovation, distrusted Republicanism, championed papal primacy, clung to the throne/altar alliance, and promoted a Baroque piety that was 'warm, emotional, colorful and ardent.'" The European and American models were incompatible, and a flood of European Jesuits to America overwhelmed the new nation and established its conservative policies. In 1864, they wholeheartedly adopted the "Syllabus of Errors", an encyclical from Pope Pius IX that named 80 specific modern liberal ideas that Catholics were forbidden to teach or believe in.

Prior to the Civil War, Jesuit plantations in the United States owned African-American slaves and participated in the Trans-Atlantic slave trade. In 1838, to raise funds Georgetown University in Washington, D.C. sold 272 African American slaves to plantation owners in Louisiana for the current-day equivalent of three million dollars. Jesuits also owned slaves in many other states. In 2017, the Jesuits apologized for their involvement and announced measures to recognize and atone for the university's participation in the slave trade. Following the Civil War, the Jesuits established operations in the African-American community inviting them community to worship at their St. Ignatius Church in Baltimore in the 1850s and starting Black parishes and schools in Florida (including St. Peter Claver Catholic School in Tampa) some decades later. The congregation would later shift away from Black ministry in response to various factors, including racist opposition and threats of violence.

The Jesuits were quite successful in establishing staffing, funding and enrolling students for a growing network of secondary and collegiate schools. As the Irish and German ethnic middle classes became better established, they sent their boys off to Jesuit schools. The main goals of the Jesuit education were to inculcate piety, loyalty to the church, and strict adherence to the rules. The chief intellectual pursuit was Thomistic philosophy. Catholic students were not allowed to attend lectures given by non-Catholics. As late as the 1950s, Catholic writers such as John Tracy Ellis were bemoaning the intellectual weakness of the Catholic community.

The late 19th century, the reform element emerged among Catholics, led by Archbishop John Ireland, that was strongly opposed by conservative elements led by the Jesuits. One battle involved creation of the Catholic University of America in Washington, which would compete directly with the nearby Jesuit school Georgetown University. The dispute lasted for decades, and weakened both schools.

== Provinces ==
The Society of Jesus is organized into geographic provinces, each of which being headed by a provincial superior. Today, there are four Jesuit provinces operating in the United States: the USA East, USA Central and Southern, USA Midwest, and USA West Provinces. At their height, there were ten provinces. Though there had been mergers in the past, a major reorganization of the provinces began in the early 21st century, with the aim of consolidating into four provinces by 2020.

The Jesuit provinces were first organized into an "assistancy" (a regional grouping of provinces), called the Jesuit Conference of the United States, in 1972. A new, consolidated assistancy was created in 2014, called the Jesuit Conference of Canada and the United States, under which all the provinces in the two countries are organized.

=== USA East ===
Maryland
Maryland-New York
New England
Maryland	New York
Buffalo
New York
USA East

The Jesuit mission in the United States dated back to 1634. However, it was not until 1833 that the first province in the United States was established: the Maryland Province. William McSherry was elected as the first provincial superior, whose territory included the entire United States except for the territory of the Missouri mission. In 1879, the Maryland Province assumed responsibility for the New York portion of the New York-Canada mission, which gave rise to the new Maryland-New York Province. From the Maryland-New York Province was separated the New England Province in 1926. The New England Province administered a mission in Iraq, Jamaica, and Jordan.

In 1943, the Maryland-New York Province was once again split into the Maryland Province and the New York Province, whose territory included all of New York State and northern New Jersey. From the New York Province, the Buffalo Province was created in 1960, whose territory included Upstate New York; due to a decline in the number of vocations, the Buffalo Province was merged back into the New York Province in 1969.

The New York Province also administered missions in the Philippines, Micronesia, and Nigeria-Ghana. In 2014, the New York Province and the New England Province merged to form the USA Northeast Province, whose territory spanned from New Jersey to Maine. Its membership included 550 Jesuits, making it the largest Jesuit province in the world at the time. In 2020, the Maryland Province and the USA Northeast Province merged to form the USA East Province, whose territory spans from Maine to Georgia.

=== USA Central and Southern ===
Missouri
New Orleans
Chicago
Detroit	Wisconsin
Chicago-Detroit
USA Midwest	USA Central and Southern

The first Jesuits entered Louisiana in the early 18th century, making New Orleans the headquarters of the French Jesuit mission in the Southern United States, which disbanded with the suppression of the Society. The first province in the South was established in 1863: the Missouri Province, whose origins dated to 1840 as a vice-province and 1823 as a mission. Out of the territory of the Missouri Province was created the New Orleans Province in 1907, whose territory included Louisiana, Georgia, Alabama, and Texas. In 2014, the Missouri Province and the New Orleans Provinces were reunited as the USA Central and Southern Provinces.

=== USA Midwest ===
The Chicago Province was created out of the Missouri Province in 1928. It also administered missions in India, Nepal, and Peru. The Detroit Province was separated from the Chicago Province in 1955. The Wisconsin Province was also created out of the Chicago Province that year. The Chicago and Detroit Provinces merged back together in 2011 as the Chicago-Detroit Province. The Chicago-Detroit and Wisconsin Provinces were merged in 2017 to become the USA Midwest Province.

=== USA West ===
California
Oregon
USA West

The California Province was established in 1909. The Oregon Province was created out of the California Province in 1932. The two re-united in 2017 as the USA West Province.

== Novitiates ==
The Jesuits in the United States established their first novitiate at what was then Georgetown College in 1806. In 1812, the novitiate moved to St. Inigoes and then Frederick, Maryland. It moved again in 1814 to White Marsh, Maryland, before returning to Georgetown in 1827, and then again to White Marsh in 1831. The novitiate returned to Frederick in 1834, where it was known as St. Stanislaus Novitiate and remained until 1891. It thereafter moved to Poughkeepsie, New York, where it was known as St. Andrew-on-Hudson. In 1904, the novitiate moved to West Park, New York.

== See also ==
- Jesuit Ivy
- List of Jesuit educational institutions (worldwide)
- List of Jesuit secondary schools in the United States
  - List of former Jesuit secondary schools in the United States
