= Peter Kenney =

Irish Jesuit

Peter James Kenney
- Born: Dublin
- Died: Rome
- Occupations: Jesuit priest Educator
- Known for: Founding Clongowes Wood

Peter James Kenney (1779–1841) was an Irish Jesuit priest. He founded Clongowes Wood College and was also rector of the Jesuits in Ireland. A gifted administrator, Kenney made two trips to the United States, where he established Maryland as a vice-province and set up Missouri as a separate Jesuit mission.

== Early life ==
Kenney was born in Dublin on 7 July 1779. His father was a coachmaker and he received his early education in Carlow College and St. Kieran's College, Kilkenny. His early education was sponsored by the Jesuit Thomas Betagh. He entered the Society of Jesus on 20 September 1804, continuing his religious training at Stonyhurst College and Palermo, Sicily, where he was ordained in 1808 and where he also obtained his D.D. degree. He returned to Ireland in 1811 with colleagues in order to re-establish the Jesuits in Ireland. At the request of the Irish bishops, Kenney served for a year as vice-president of Maynooth.

== Life as an educator ==
At the time of the suppression of the Society of Jesus in 1773, there were seventeen Jesuits in Ireland. No longer Jesuits, they became diocesan priests. In hope of the order's re-establishment at some point, they began to save some funds for the purpose of reviving their work. In 1813, using money set aside by the Irish Jesuits, Kenney purchased Castle Brown and the grounds for Clongowes Wood College to provide education to the Irish Catholic gentry. It was the first school set up by the restored Jesuits society. He was also involved in the establishment of the sister school to Clongowes, Tullabeg College in County Offaly. Father Kenney was a friend of the founder of the Christian Brothers Edmund Rice whom he advised (Rice helped Kenney in purchasing Clongowes Wood) and also played a big part in the foundation of the Irish Sisters of Charity.

Upon his return from his first visit to America, in 1822 Kenney became superior of the mission and rector of Clongowes for a second time. He served as a witness in Royal Commission on Education and the House of Lords Enquiry of (1825–1826).

== Visitor to the United States ==
In 1819 he was sent as a canonical visitor to the Jesuit mission in Maryland in the United States, which including Georgetown College. A number of years later he again was appointed visitor to the Jesuits' mission in Missouri. During his visitation in 1822, he visited many Jesuit plantations, and gave an order to Jesuit farmers to "part with slaves". At one point, he declined to work with the Archbishop of Dublin, preferring to work in education.

In 1830, he returned to the United States, where he spent three years. He established Maryland as a vice-province and Missouri as an independent mission.

== Later life ==
Kenney returned to Ireland in 1834 and was one of the four founders of the Jesuit Church of St. Francis Xavier, Upper Gardiner Street, the first Catholic church erected in Dublin following the passing of the Roman Catholic Relief Act 1829. He died in Rome on 19 November 1841.

== Legacy ==
In St. Patrick's College, Maynooth, the Peter Kenney Prize is awarded to students of ecclesiastical history studying for BD or BTh degrees. In Clongowes Fr Kenney Day is celebrated each June. Old boys of 40 or more years since graduation are invited for a service, meal and tour of the college
