= Procurator (Catholic canon law) =

Position of authority in the Catholic church

In the canon law of the Catholic Church, a procurator is one who acts on behalf of and by virtue of the authority of another. In a monastery, the procurator is the friar, monk or nun charged with administering its financial affairs. Bishops have been represented at councils by procurators, as Peter Canisius attended the Council of Trent as procurator for the Bishop of Augsburg.

== Procurator at Rome ==
Catholic Religious institutes, societies of apostolic life and autonomous particular Churches sui iuris (especially Eastern Catholic, each using a non-Latin rite) may have representatives resident in Rome acting on their behalf in business they may have with the Holy See, who are titled Procurators General.

== Internal regular procurators ==
Within the above regular institutes of consecrated life and societies of apostolic life, the person charged with matters such as the purchase of provisions, furniture, books and other supplies may be called a procurator.

== Canonical litigation ==
A party to litigation may generally appoint a procurator instead of responding personally.

The name "fiscal procurator" or "fiscal promoter" was previously used in canon law for the official known since the publication of the 1917 Code of Canon Law as the promoter of justice, whose function is to safeguard the public welfare in cases brought before ecclesiastical tribunals.

== See also ==
- Apocrisiarius
- Proctor
