= Slavery at American colleges and universities =

Historical investigation and controversy

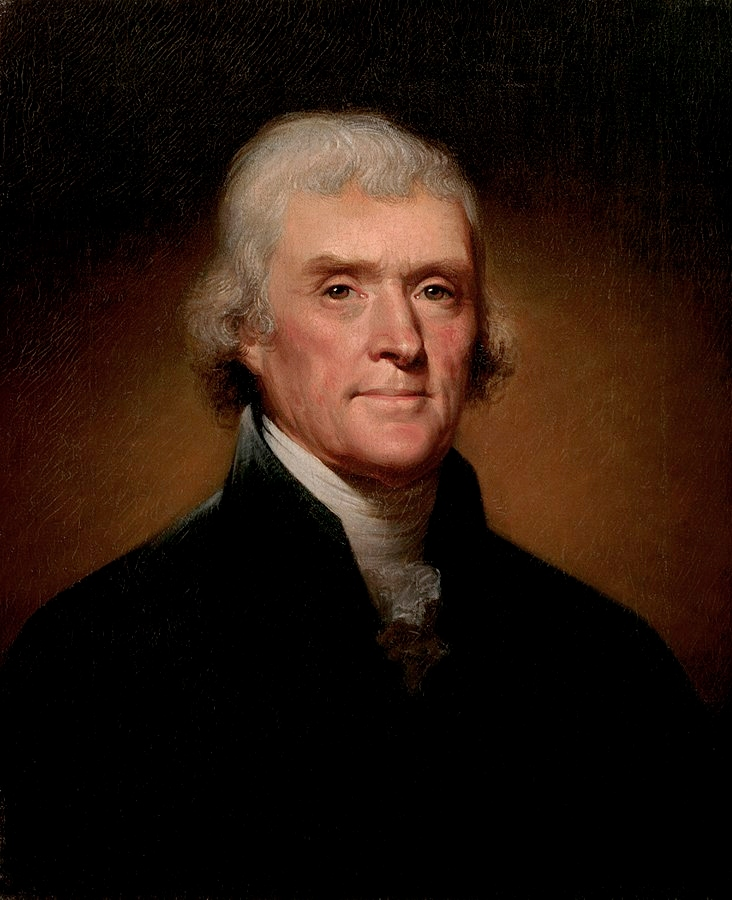
Thomas Jefferson, Founding Father of the United States and prominent holder of hundreds of enslaved persons, founded the University of Virginia

The role of slavery at American colleges and universities has been a recent focus of historical investigation and controversy. Enslaved Africans labored to build institutions of higher learning in the United States, and the slave economy was involved in funding many universities. Enslaved persons were used to build academic buildings and residential halls. Though slavery has often been seen as a uniquely Southern institution, colleges and universities in Northern states benefited from the labor of slaves. The economics of slavery brought some slave owners great wealth, enabling them to become major donors to fledgling colleges.

Until the American Civil War (1861–1865), slavery as an institution was legal and many colleges and universities utilized enslaved people and benefited from the slavocracy. In some cases, enslaved persons were sold by university administrators to generate capital, notably Georgetown University, a Catholic institution. In some parts of the nation it was also not uncommon for wealthy students to bring an enslaved person with them to college. Ending almost 250 years of slavocracy did not end white supremacy, structural racism, or other forms of oppression at American colleges and the legacy of slavery still persists in many establishments.

In 2004, Ira Berlin observed that the study of slavery at universities can be controversial and can lead to tense debates. "Accompanied by the charge that the interpreters have said too much (why do you dwell upon it?) or too little (why can't you face the truth?)." He contends that by reckoning with slavery, “Americans—white and black—can have a past that is both memorable and, at last, a past.”

In 2006, Brown University became the first university to publish a report detailing its ties to slavery. Over the following decades, a number of American colleges and universities have made efforts to research, address, and teach about their historical connections to slavery. In 2014, a number of institutions led by the University of Virginia established Universities Studying Slavery (USS), an informal working group and later consortium dedicated to investigating institutional histories as they relate to slavery or racism. Efforts and calls to address historical connections to slavery and enduring racism at American universities were renewed in the wake of the 2020 George Floyd protests.

== Brown University ==
A number of Brown University's founders and early administrators owned slaves. Among them were Stephen Hopkins, Brown's first chancellor; and James Manning, the college's first president.

=== The Brown family ===
The Brown family, the university's namesake, were instrumental in the establishment and endowment of the college. They owned slaves and participated in the slave trade, investing in two slaving voyages (1736 and 1759). Compared to fellow members of Rhode Island's elite mercantile class, the Browns were not major slave traders. According to historian Joanne Melish, "many Providence residents held more slaves than John Brown."

The family's relationship with slavery was neither monolithic nor constant. In 1773, Moses Brown experienced an emotional and spiritual crisis which led to his conversion to Quakerism. At that time, Moses, who had previously enslaved six people, renounced chattel slavery. Moses freed his slaves the same year, writing:

Whereas I am clearly convinced that the buying and selling of men of what color soever is contrary to the Divine Mind manifest in the conscience of all men however some may smother and neglect its reprovings, and being also made sensible that the holding of negroes in slavery however kindly treated has a tendency to encourage the iniquitous practice of importing them from their native country and is contrary to that justice, mercy, and humanity enjoined as the duty of every Christian.

Over the following years, Moses emerged as a prominent abolitionist and began an anti-slavery crusade. These views clashed with those of his brother, John, who defend the practice, leading to a period of vocal public debate between the two. John Brown continued to participate in the international slave trade into the 1790s, following its federal abolition. For this violation, John was tried in federal court, making him the first person charged under the law.

Brown's oldest building, University Hall, maintains a number of connections to slavery. Prominent Newport merchant and slave trader Aaron Lopez donated timber to the building project while the company of fellow slave trader Nicholas Brown Sr. led the construction. The workforce involved in the construction of the building was diverse, reflecting the ethnic and social admixture of colonial Providence's population. Slaves, free people of color, indigenous people, and white skilled and unskilled laborers worked to erect the structure.

=== 'Slavery and Justice Report' ===
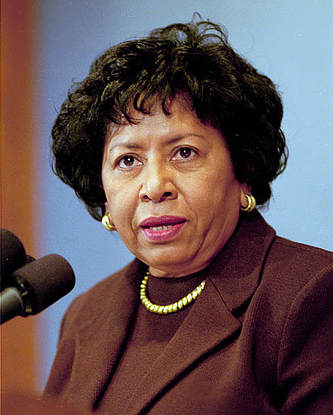
Ruth J. Simmons, the first African American president of an Ivy League institution, spearheaded Brown's modern response to its legacy of slavery.

In 2003, then-university president Ruth Simmons launched a steering committee to research Brown’s eighteenth-century ties to slavery. In October 2006, the committee released a report documenting its findings.

Entitled Slavery and Justice, the document detailed ways in which the university benefited, both directly and indirectly, from the transatlantic slave trade and the labour of enslaved people. The report included seven recommendations for how the university should address this legacy.

Brown has since implemented several of these recommendations, including the establishment of the Center for the Study of Slavery and Justice and the creation of a $10 million permanent endowment for Providence Public Schools.

Brown's Slavery and Justice report was among the first major efforts by an American university to examine its historical ties to slavery and encouraged similar initiatives at other institutions.

==== Memorialization ====
In September 2014, the university erected a memorial acknowledging the institution's connection to the transatlantic slave trade and commemorating the Africans and African Americans, both enslaved and free, who contributed to the university’s early development. Its creation was one of the recommendations in the 2006 Slavery and Justice report.

The memorial, designed by contemporary sculptor Martin Puryear and located adjacent to University Hall, resembles a large ball and chain partially embedded in the ground.

==== Reparations ====
In a 2021 vote, more than 80% of participating Brown University students supported a non-binding referendum calling for the university to pay reparations to the descendants of people enslaved by its founders and benefactors.

In April 2021, President Christina Paxson declined to commit to a policy of direct financial compensation, describing the issue as a "really complicated question."

== Columbia University ==
Columbia University (then known as King's College) was formed in 1754. By the end of the Civil War, ten men had served as president of the school; of those, at least half were slave-owners, as were the first four treasurers of the school.

The report, Columbia University and Slavery identifies the slave owners among its first presidents: Samuel Johnson, Benjamin Moore, William Samuel Johnson, William Alexander Duer, and Frederick A. P. Barnard. Duer's family wealth derived from the transatlantic slave trade. The school does not appear to have ever owned any slaves directly. Since a 2015 course on the school's connections to slavery, Columbia has maintained a website with the findings.

=== Barnard College ===
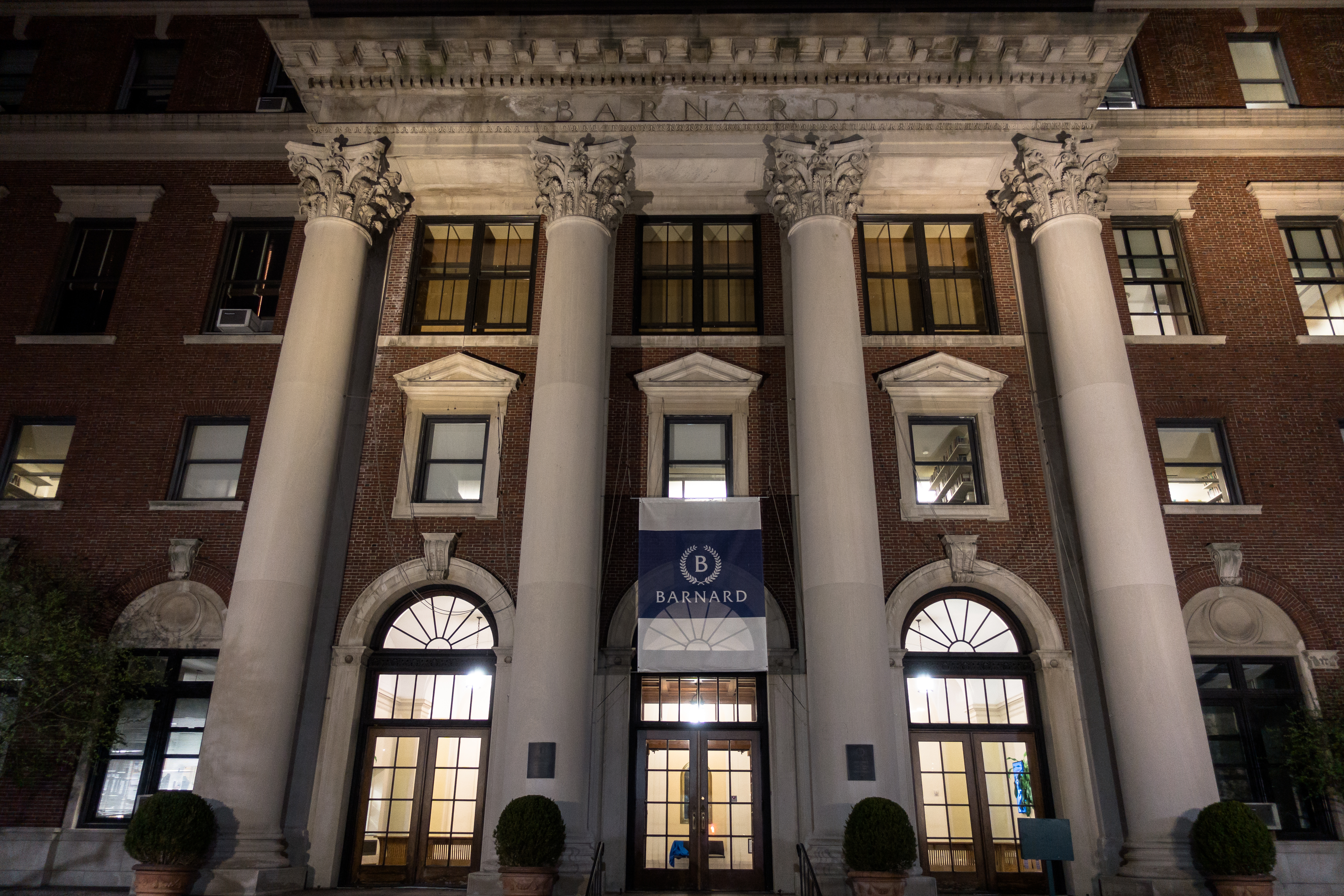
Frederick A. P. Barnard, namesake of Barnard College, owned enslaved persons while at the University of Alabama, but he returned to the North during the Civil War.

The namesake of Barnard College, Frederick A. P. Barnard enslaved an unknown number of people, many of whose names are absent in official records. The women's college is named after him in part due to his support for coeducation of women and men.

Sometime after he began working at the University of Alabama, Barnard acquired enslaved persons. Some worked as research assistants in his labs, including one named Sam, while others served as domestic servants in his home. During his time in Alabama, Barnard also allegedly sexually abused enslaved black women, a behavior tolerated by his peers on the faculty. A list of other enslaved people associated with Barnard in Alabama included: "Little Mary", Morgan, Luna, Tom, and Johnson. Barnard described his 16 years at the University of Alabama as "some of the happiest and most fruitful years of his life".

One of the people he enslaved, Jane, was assaulted in 1859 by a student while she was working for Barnard at the University of Mississippi. Barnard, who was away at the time of the assault, sought expulsion of the offending student by the university faculty. It is unclear whether Barnard's motivation for this was retributive justice for Jane or restitution for himself after the intrusion on his home and lost labor as Jane recovered. Jane did not get justice since her testimony was not deemed credible according to Mississippi law, and the faculty did not expel her assailant. This incident created a wedge between Barnard and the rest of the university establishment, leading to his eventual departure – in which he left much of his property, including his slaves, behind.

Barnard colleagues at universities in the South, viewed him with suspicion in large part due to his Northern upbringing. Despite being a slaveowner, he was often suspected by his peers of having sympathies for the abolitionist cause. In response to claims of being an abolitionist sympathizer, Barnard continually reiterated his support for the South and for the institution of slavery. However, upon his return to the North during the Civil War, Barnard published an open letter to Abraham Lincoln in which he affirmed loyalty to the Union and defended past pro-slavery statements as necessary political strategy.

== Dartmouth College ==
Dartmouth's founder Eleazar Wheelock held at least 18 enslaved black people during his lifetime. Eight slaves accompanied Wheelock when he established Dartmouth's Hanover campus in 1770. According to Craig Wilder "there were more slaves than faculty, administrators, or active trustees; in fact, there were arguably as many enslaved black people at Dartmouth as there were students in the college course, and Wheelock's slaves outnumbered his Native American students."

Dartmouth College president Nathan Lord defended slavery in the lead up to the American Civil War, causing controversy and leading to his eventual resignation.

== Georgetown University ==
=== 1838 Jesuit slave sale ===
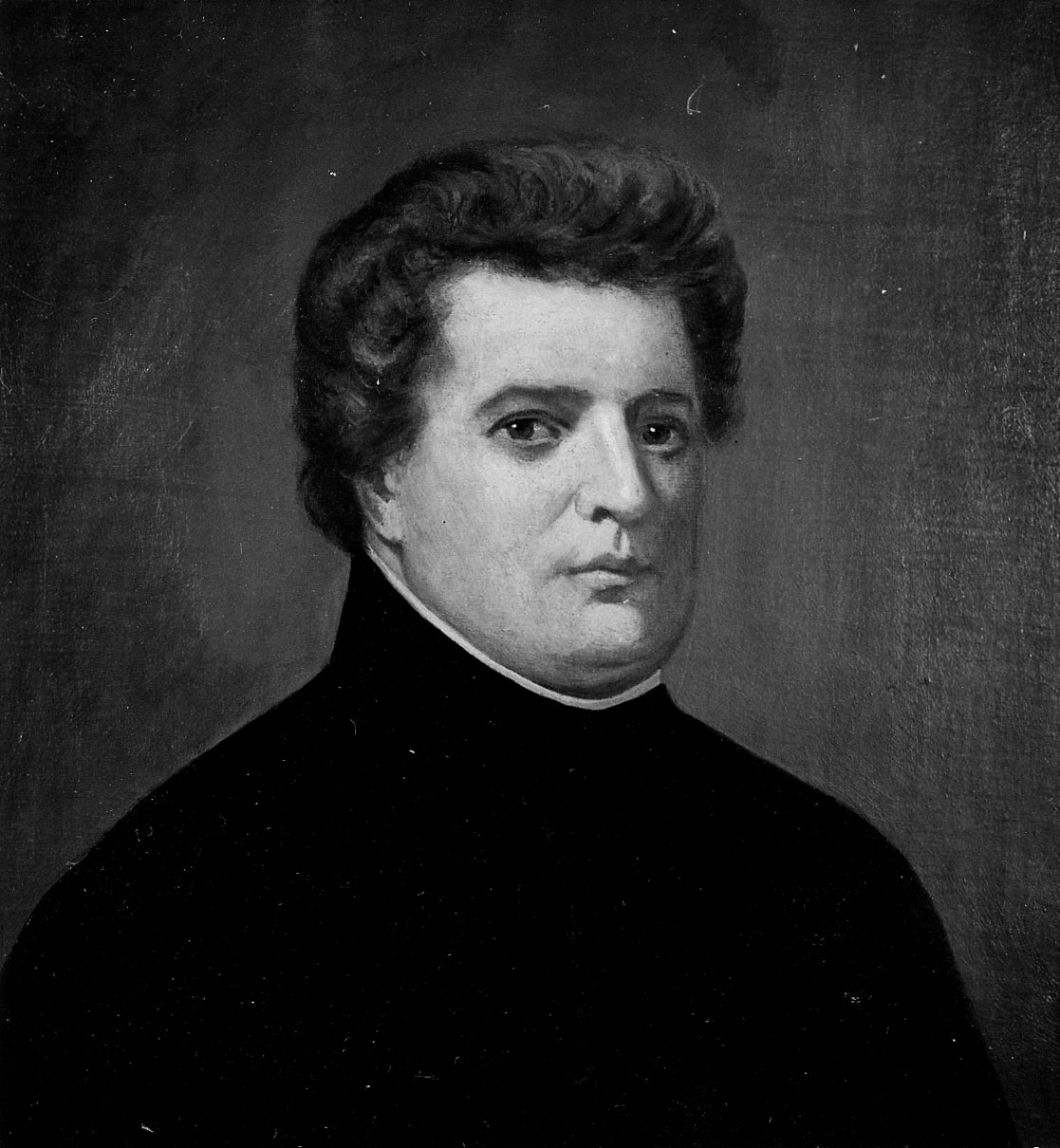
Thomas F. Mulledy orchestrated the sale of 272 enslaved people to pay Georgetown College's debts

Founded in 1789 as a Catholic educational institution, Georgetown College (now Georgetown University) was in financial straits in 1838. The decision was taken to sell church property in the form of 272 enslaved persons owned by the Maryland Province of the Society of Jesus. The 1838 Jesuit slave sale generated cash, about 10% of which was used to satisfy Georgetown's debts. The slaves had lived on plantations belonging to the Jesuits in Maryland, and they were sold to Henry Johnson of Louisiana and Jesse Batey. The sale price was $115,000, equivalent to $3,476,953 in 2025. Of the $25,000 down-payment, $17,000 was used to pay down building debt that Thomas F. Mulledy, the provincial superior who orchestrated the sale, had previously accrued as Georgetown's president.

The Jesuits has a documented history at Georgetown of callousness toward enslaved persons. In 1821, Georgetown's procurator objected to the food served to the enslaved peoples who were on campus as being too expensive and generous. He wrote that the slave rations were “carried there in abundance” and called for more austere food provisions.

==== 21st century response ====
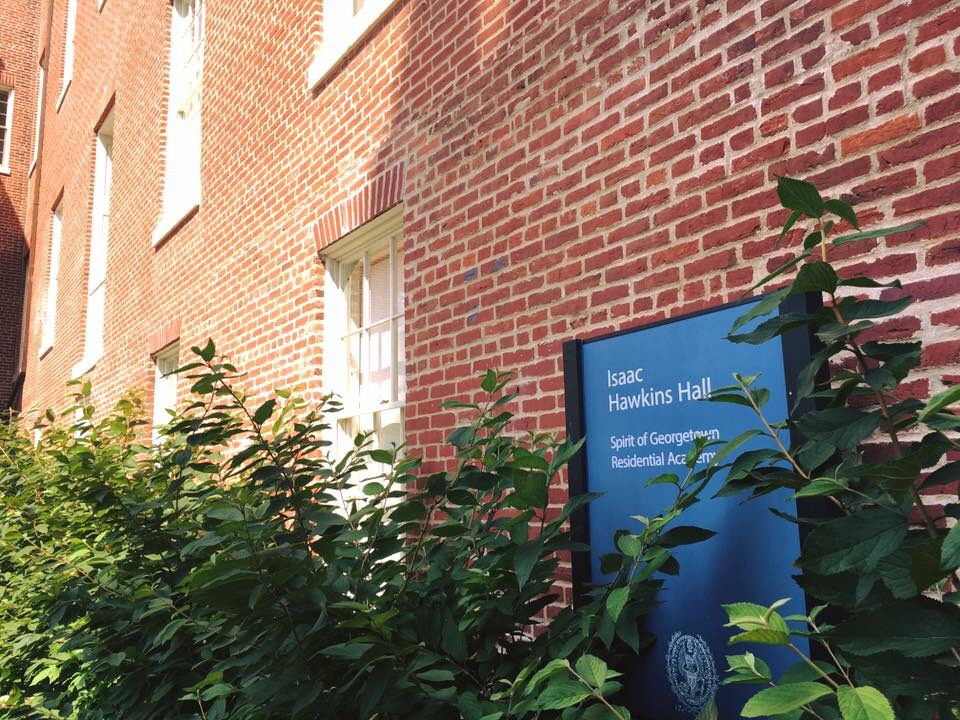
Isaac Hawkins Hall at Georgetown University was renamed in 2017 after Hawkins, the first enslaved person listed in the 1838 sale document.

National revelations of this connection were reported in a 2016 article in The New York Times by Rachel L. Swarns. In response to the revelations, Georgetown University held a service called the "Liturgy of Remembrance, Contrition and Hope." At the liturgy, Fr. Timothy Kesicki, the president of the Jesuit Conference of Canada and the United States, said, “Those 272 souls...received the same sacraments, read from the same scriptures, prayed the same prayers, sang the same hymns, and praised the same God—how did we, the Society of Jesus, fail to see us all as one body in Christ? We betrayed the very name of Jesus for whom our least Society is named.”

Following broad publicity regarding the transaction, the university moved to rename two buildings that bore the names of Jesuits at Georgetown who had played significant roles in the 1838 sale, Thomas Mulledy and William McSherry. In November 2015, Mulledy Hall was renamed Freedom Hall and McSherry Hall was renamed Remembrance Hall as temporary measures while other names were being considered. In 2017, the two buildings were rededicated in the names of Isaac, the first slave listed in the 1838 sale document, and Anne Marie Becraft, a free woman of color who established a school in Georgetown for black girls.

== Hamilton College ==
Hamilton College's alumni included several abolitionists and the school was among several New England colleges where abolitionist groups formed in the 1830s. The groups were inspired by William Lloyd Garrison's American Anti-Slavery Society. The New York State Legislature threatened to withhold funding, leading the college's president, Joseph Penny, to ban the group.

The college's namesake, Alexander Hamilton, grew up in the Caribbean and saw plantation slavery first-had there. His patron at King's College was a slave owner. Hamilton married into the prominent New York Schyler family, which owned slaves. He was generally opposed to slavery, but his writings did not prioritize it as an issue. He was involved in the early emancipation movement there is recently uncovered evidence that he was a slave owner and also sold or leased some of his slaves.

== Harvard University ==
Following the lead of the project at Brown University to uncover that institution's ties to slavery, a graduate seminar at Harvard researched Harvard's ties, producing a report in 2011. Sven Beckert, then graduate student Katherine Stevens, and the students of the Harvard and Slavery Research Seminar published a report about Harvard and its ties to slavery. The report begins by locating Harvard's ties to slavery in the larger concepts of American slavery, Northern slavery, and Triangular Trade. The report notes that, “by the mid-seventeenth century, slaves were part of the fabric of everyday life in colonial Massachusetts. They lived and labored in the colony. Their owners were often political leaders and heads of prominent families.” Slaves “served Harvard leaders" and "slave labor played a vital role in the unprecedented appreciation of wealth by New England merchants that laid the foundation of Harvard.” Research published in 2017 states that “Harvard students slept in beds and ate meals prepared by slaves, and many grew up to be prominent slave-holders and leaders in early America."

Finally, in 2019 university president Larry Bacow created The Initiative on Harvard and the Legacy of Slavery in an effort to better understand Harvard's historic ties with slavery and the slave trade, and the impacts of those ties on the modern university. A committee was formed to examine and research the history, led by Tomiko Brown-Nagin, Dean of the Radcliffe Institute for Advanced Study, and including Sven Beckert, Paul Farmer, Annette Gordon-Reed, Stephen Gray, Evelynn Hammonds, Nancy Koehn, Meira Levinson, Tiya Miles, Martha Minow, Maya Sen, Daniel Smith, David Williams, and William Julius Wilson.

The report was released in April 2022 and found that Harvard had extensive ties to slavery. Harvard affiliates, including past presidents and faculty, enslaved more than 70 people during the earliest years, many of whom served the college's earliest students. It also documented that the university continued to benefit financially from slavery even after it was outlawed in Massachusetts in 1783, via the financial support of donors enriched by the slave trade and the trading of goods harvested by enslaved people.

Also in the report were recommendations from the committee on how the university should move forward and redress its legacy of slavery. Among them were educational support for descendent communities, memorialization of enslaved persons, forming partnerships with Historically Black Colleges and Universities, and directly engaging and identifying descendants, among others.

Bacow and members of the Harvard Corporation unanimously agreed to accept the recommendations and committed $100 million to their short- and long-term implementation. Martha Minow, a University Professor and former Dean of Harvard Law School, was appointed to lead the implementation.

=== Harvard Law School ===
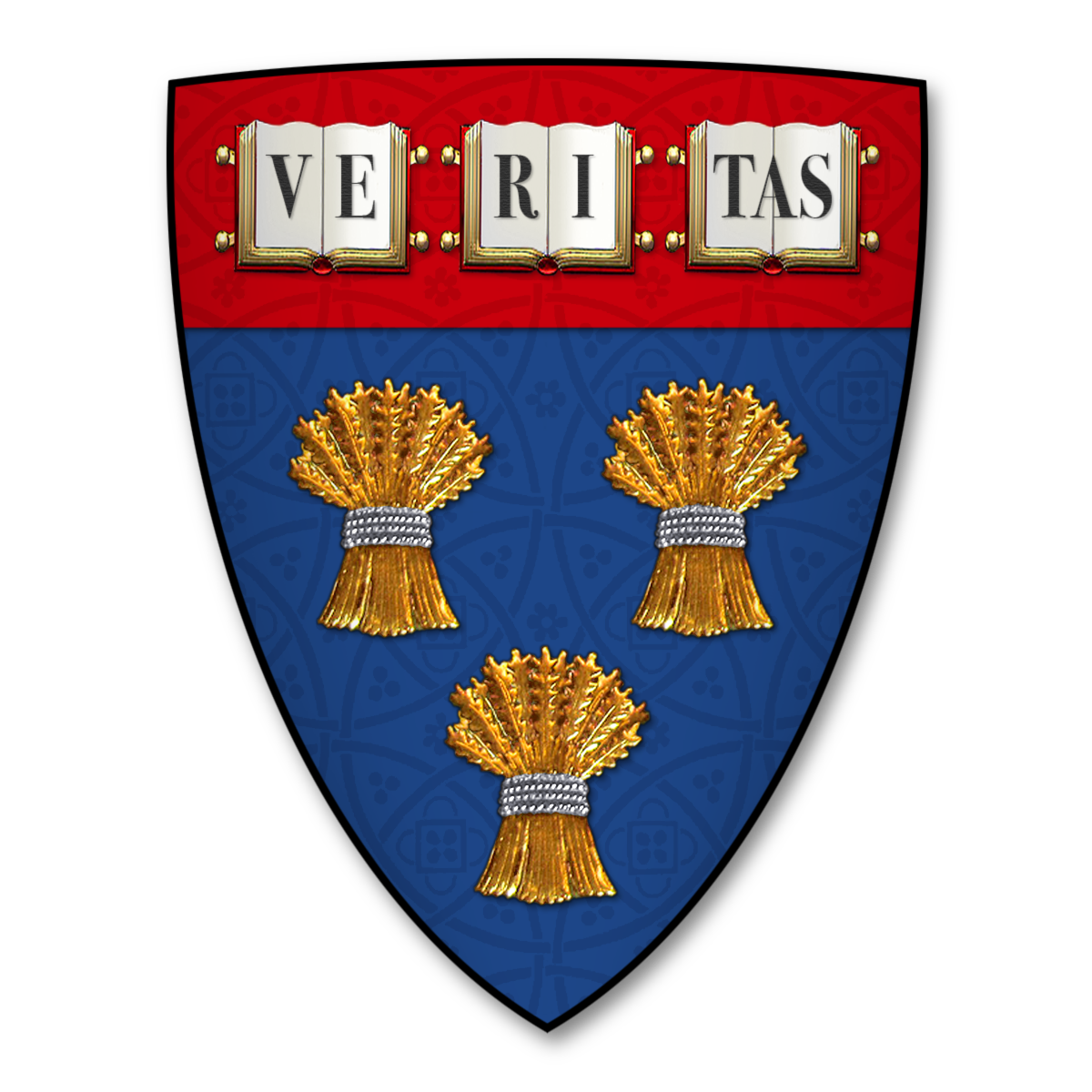
The seal of Harvard Law School used between 1936 and 2016.

Isaac Royall Jr. was a wealthy merchant who donated land and funds to the university. He also funded the first professorship in law. The Royalls were so involved in the slave trade that "the labor of slaves underwrote the teaching of law in Cambridge." The Royall's legacy at Harvard is lasting: Harvard Law School adopted the family's crest as a part of its own. That crest features a blue background with three bushels of wheat. Until recently this connection was unknown to many. After it was revealed that Harvard Law had historic ties to slavery, Dean Martha L. Minow began telling incoming law students about the school's past. The law school retired the seal in 2016 and in 2019 announced the formation of a working group to design a new one. In August 2021, the school unveiled a new seal featuring an abstract motif inspired by the architecture of Austin Hall and Hauser Hall. In conjunction with the university's release of the Report on Harvard and the Legacy of Slavery in spring of 2022, the Law School announced the permanent retirement of the Royal Chair, which was funded by an original gift from the Royal family, would be retired and never occupied again.

At the law school's bicentennial in 2017, President Drew Faust, Dean John Manning, and Professor Annette Gordon-Reed unveiled a new commemorative plaque to the slaves who helped build the schools. Faust said of the law school, "How fitting that you should begin your bicentennial with this ceremony reminding us that the path toward justice is neither smooth nor straight. Let us dedicate ourselves to the clear-eyed view of history that will enable us to build a more just future in honor of the stolen lives we memorialize here."

=== Photographs ===
Harvard was sued in 2019 by descendants of an enslaved man whose daguerreotype is in the possession of the university. According to the lawsuit, the university profits off of the publication of the photographs without permission of the enslaved man's descendants. In 2021, Middlesex County Superior Court Judge Camille Sarrouf dismissed the case, writing "the law as it currently stands, does not confer a property interest to the subject of a photograph regardless of how objectionable the photograph's origins may be."

In the 1990s, artist Carrie Mae Weems used the photograph in a series entitled "From Here I Saw What Happened and I Cried."

== Johns Hopkins University ==
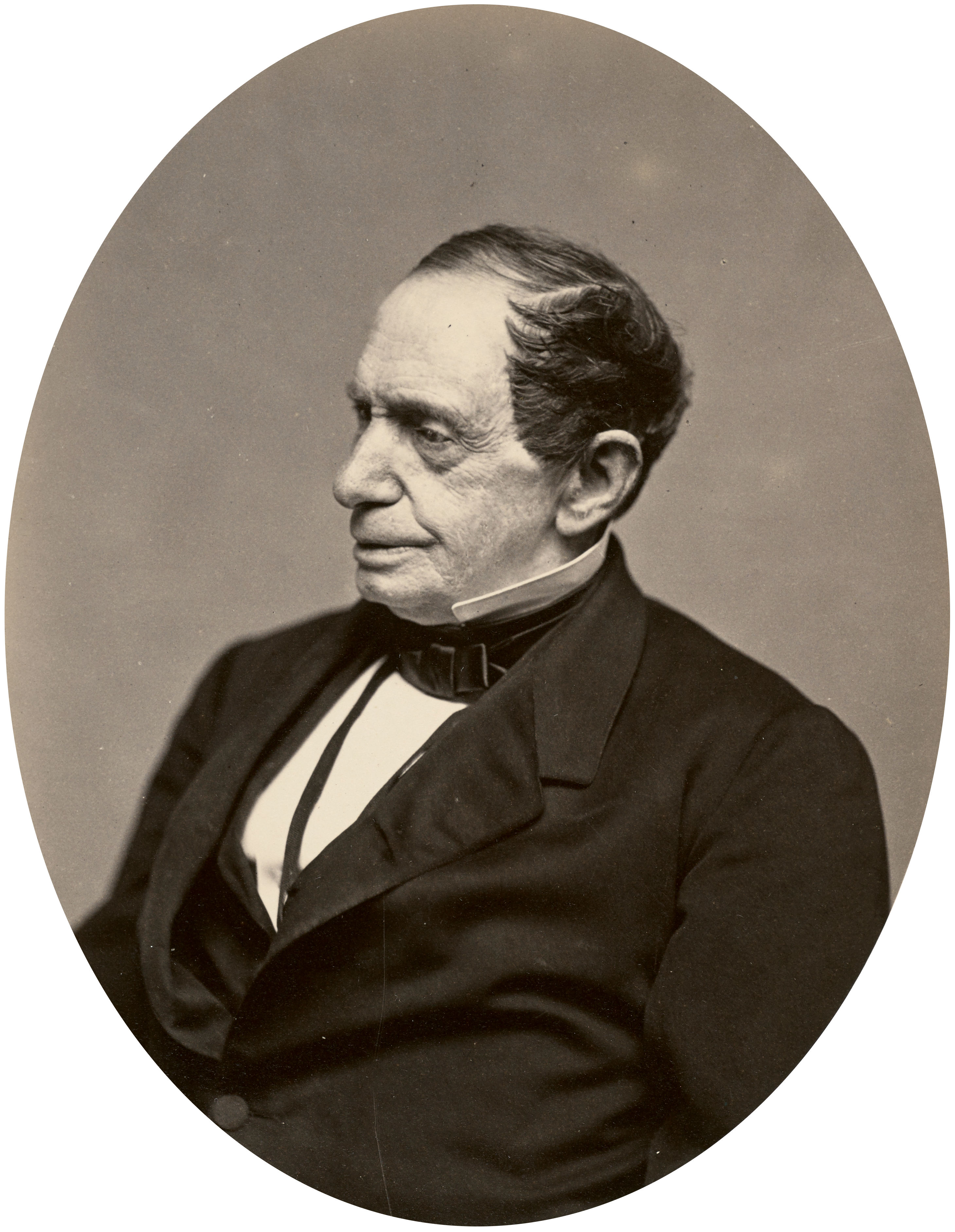
In 2020, researchers discovered Johns Hopkins University's founder and namesake, Johns Hopkins, had enslaved at least 4 people.

In 2020, historians at Johns Hopkins University discovered that its founder, original benefactor and namesake, Johns Hopkins, claimed four men as property in the 1850 census. Hopkins had also used slaves as collateral for debt.

Prior to the discovery, the university had held its founder was a "strong abolitionist," based on the representation of Hopkins in a 1929 publication written by his grandniece and published by the school's press. The main claim being that Johns Hopkins' parents freed all their slaves by 1807. Many also pointed to his specification that people of any race should be cared for in his hospital and his encouragement for the trustees of the hospital to establish an orphanage for black children. This information may have remained unknown for so long due to the fact that most of Hopkins' personal papers were destroyed or lost since his death.

According to the university, "the current research... finds no evidence to substantiate [the] description of Johns Hopkins as an abolitionist." In an open letter the university's president, Ronald J. Daniels, stated the findings "complicate the understanding" of the school towards its founder.

== University of Pennsylvania ==
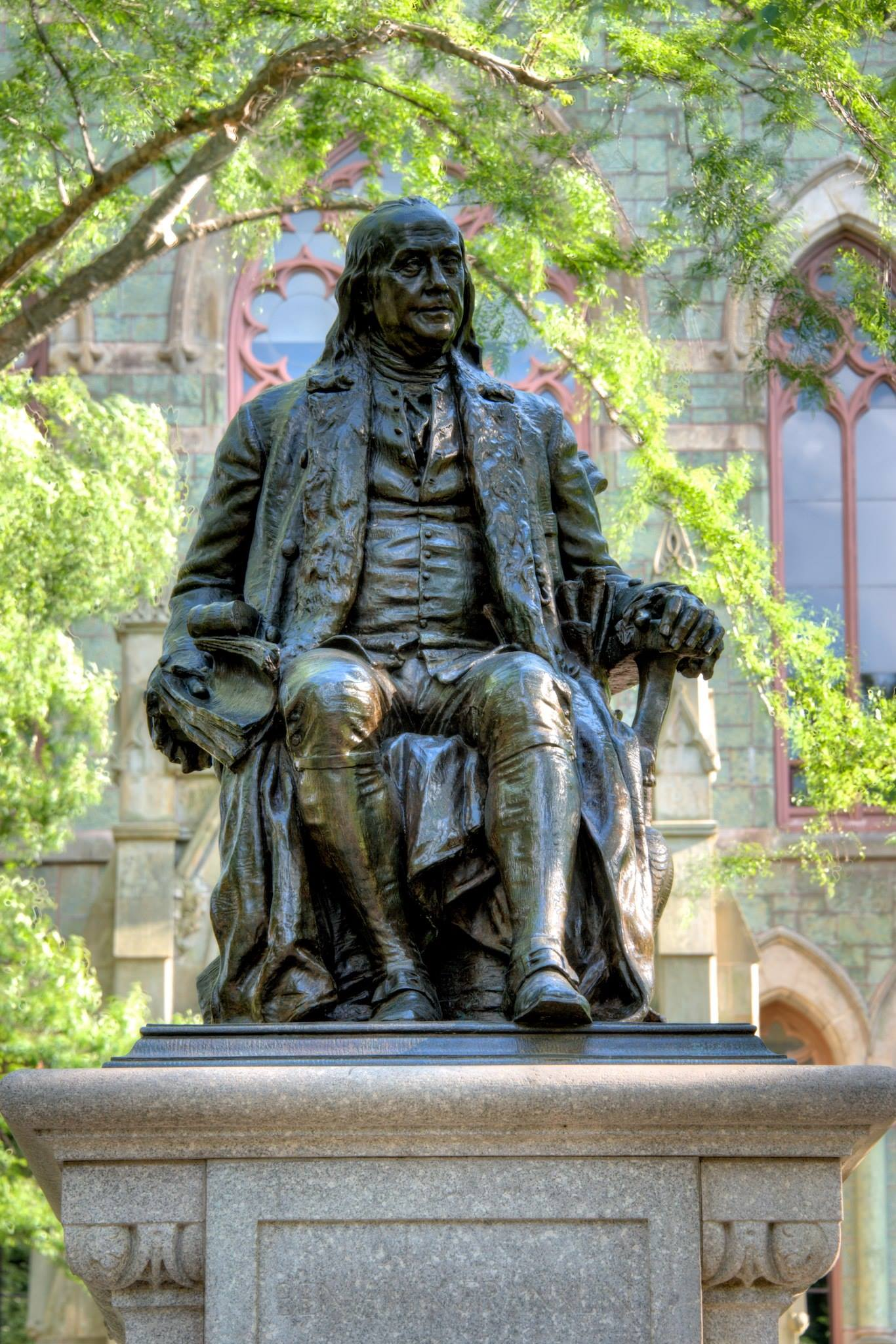
Benjamin Franklin, founder of the University of Pennsylvania, owned seven slaves in his early life, and published 277 advertisements for the sale of enslaved people and owned some enslaved persons before the Revolution.

The University of Pennsylvania's founders, benefactors, trustees, and faculty included slave owners or those profiting from the institution. Among these were the university's founder and first president, Benjamin Franklin, who earlier in life ran advertisements for the sale of enslaved people in his newspaper, the Pennsylvania Gazette and held seven slaves working in his business and household. His views evolved over time and he was a founder of the first anti-slavery society in America and sought to link emancipation to the Revolution.

In 2017, the university began the Penn & Slavery Project to explore the connections of its funders, trustees, and faculty to slavery as well as uncover the stories of people enslaved by them. Among the trustees of the university who enslaved people were John Cadwalader, Benjamin Chew, Benjamin Franklin, Isaac Norris, William Plumsted, James Potter, Joseph Reed, and Thomas Willing.

Caesar was one enslaved man who worked at the university from 1756 to 1770. He was enslaved by Ebenezer Kinnersley, a colleague of Benjamin Franklin and faculty member. Caesar's duties on the early university campus included ringing the school bell and building fires for the students, but Kinnersley was paid by the university for Caesar's work. It is unclear if Caesar was ever freed. Caesar's Bell became the symbol for the Penn & Slavery Project as it had rested in the Van Pelt Library without acknowledgement of Caesar's work.

== Princeton University ==
Sixteen out of Princeton University's first twenty-three trustees "bought, sold, traded, or inherited slaves during their lifetimes" and the school had "deep and intimate ties to human bondage." The first nine presidents of Princeton University enslaved people. Upon the death of its fifth president, Samuel Finley, in 1766, the people he held captive were auctioned on campus. John Maclean Jr. (1854–1868) was the first president to not forcibly hold people against their will. Princeton also had connections to the colonization movement which aimed to stop the Atlantic Slave Trade but also repatriate emancipated slaves to Africa as they were perceived as a burden on public resources.

White supremacy and structural racism at Princeton did not end with the end of the slavocracy. Princeton President Woodrow Wilson (1902–1910), for example, was an avowed white supremacist.

== Rutgers University ==
The namesake of Rutgers was Henry Rutgers, a trustee of the institution. He was a third generation slave owner and as a real estate developer he used slave labor to build his own wealth.

Rutgers has a long history of involvement with the slave trade. Some of the founders, early benefactors, and early presidents were involved in the slave trade. During the Revolutionary War the college relocated the homestead of slave owner. The first president of Rutgers (then Queen's College), Jacob Rutsen Hardenbergh was a slaveholder, among his slaves was Sojourner Truth who later escaped to freedom. Rutgers University's oldest extant building, Old Queens, was built in part by enslaved laborers including one man named Will.

Shortly before Rutgers University reached its 250th anniversary Chancellor-Provost Richard Edwards announced the formation of the Committee on Enslaved and Disenfranchised Populations in Rutgers History. This committee created the Scarlet and Black Project which published 3 volumes of books by the same name and digital archives covering the entire racial history of Rutgers.

Additionally the committee put forward recommendations including explicit acknowledgement on campus of its history, establishing and expanding affirmative action programs, commissioning a memorial for the dispossessed and enslaved, renaming buildings, funding of further research, and making a diversity course required for all students.

== University of Virginia ==
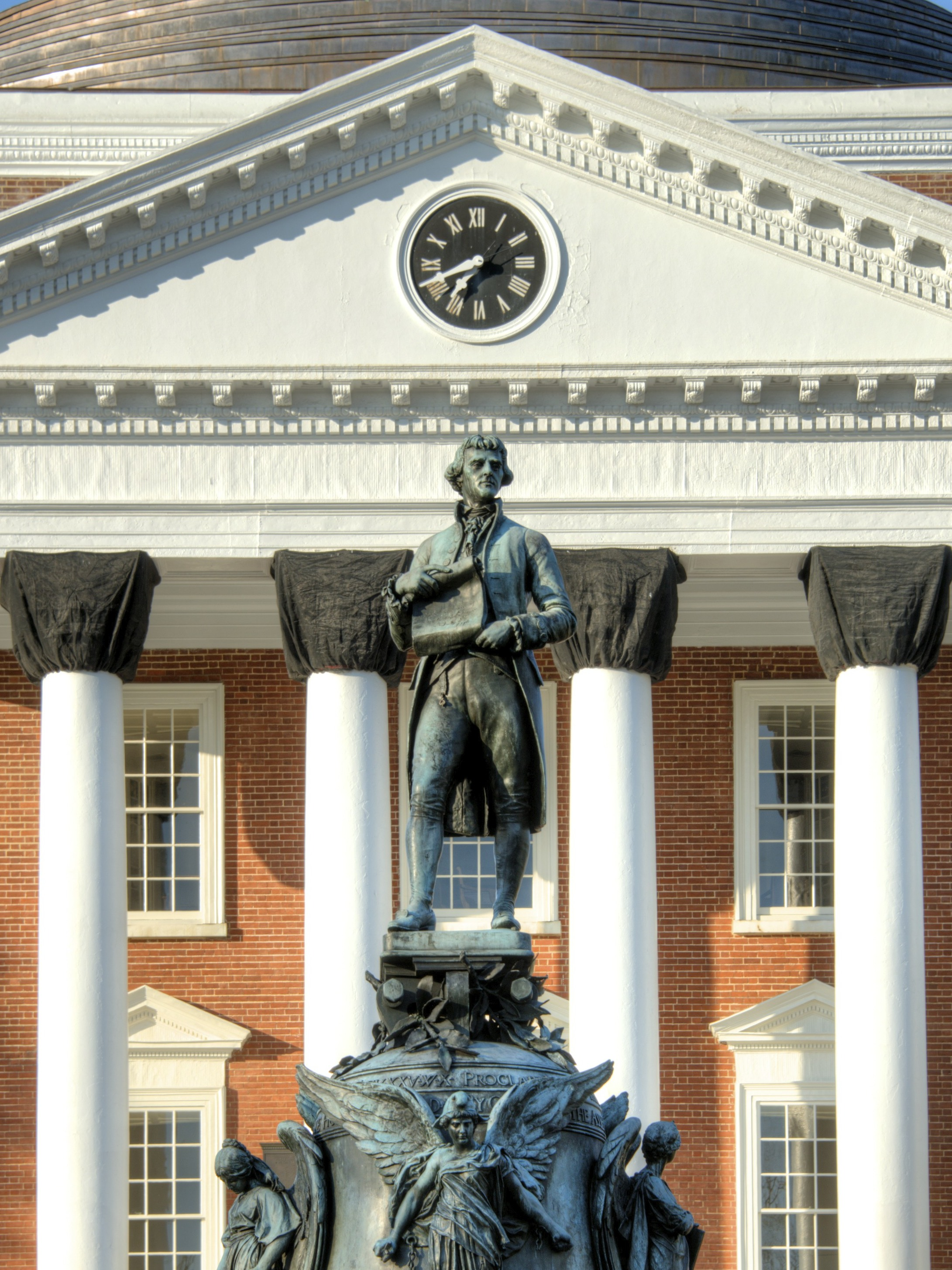
Thomas Jefferson, founder of the University of Virginia, enslaved more than 600 people in his lifetime

The University of Virginia in Charlottesville, Virginia owned and rented slaves for decades. Between 1817 and 1865, approximately 4,000 enslaved people worked on the University of Virginia's campus. All of the men involved in the founding of the university were slaveowners. These individuals maintained the university's grounds, worked to construct buildings, served the students and faculty, and sometimes lived in quarters below student residences. The majority of students during this period were able to attend due to the wealth of their slave-owning families, though these students were not permitted to bring their own slaves.

After the Civil War, though the slaves of the university gained their freedom they were still employed for very low wages.

=== Thomas Jefferson ===
The University of Virginia's founder, Thomas Jefferson enslaved more than 600 African American people during his lifetime. Most historians believe that after the death of his wife Martha, Jefferson had a decades-long relationship with her half-sister, Sally Hemings, a slave at his plantation, Monticello. According to DNA evidence from surviving descendants and oral history, Jefferson probably fathered at least six children with Hemings, including four that survived to adulthood. Many argue that given her position, Hemings was not able to consent to sexual contact, making Jefferson's actions rape.

When establishing the University of Virginia Jefferson's vision was that it would be an institution to protect against the abolitionists of the North. Jefferson's own slaves were involved in the construction of the university.

=== Memorial to Enslaved Laborers ===
In 2020, the university completed the construction of its Memorial to Enslaved Laborers. Designed by Höweler+Yoon, the memorial honors the community of enslaved African American laborers that constructed and facilitated the operation of the university.

== College of William & Mary ==
The College of William & Mary, founded in 1693, benefited from enslaved labor from its inception in 1693 until the Emancipation Proclamation made slavery illegal in 1863. An academic inquiry into its slavery history, the Lemon Project, is underway.

Between 1760 and 1765, the Prince George House may have been used by English philanthropists, the Associates of Dr. Bray (named for Thomas Bray), to Christianize and educate local enslaved and free black children. Adam and Fanny, two children who were enslaved by William & Mary, attended the school at its second location, assumed to have been on Capitol Landing Road in Williamsburg.

== Furman University ==
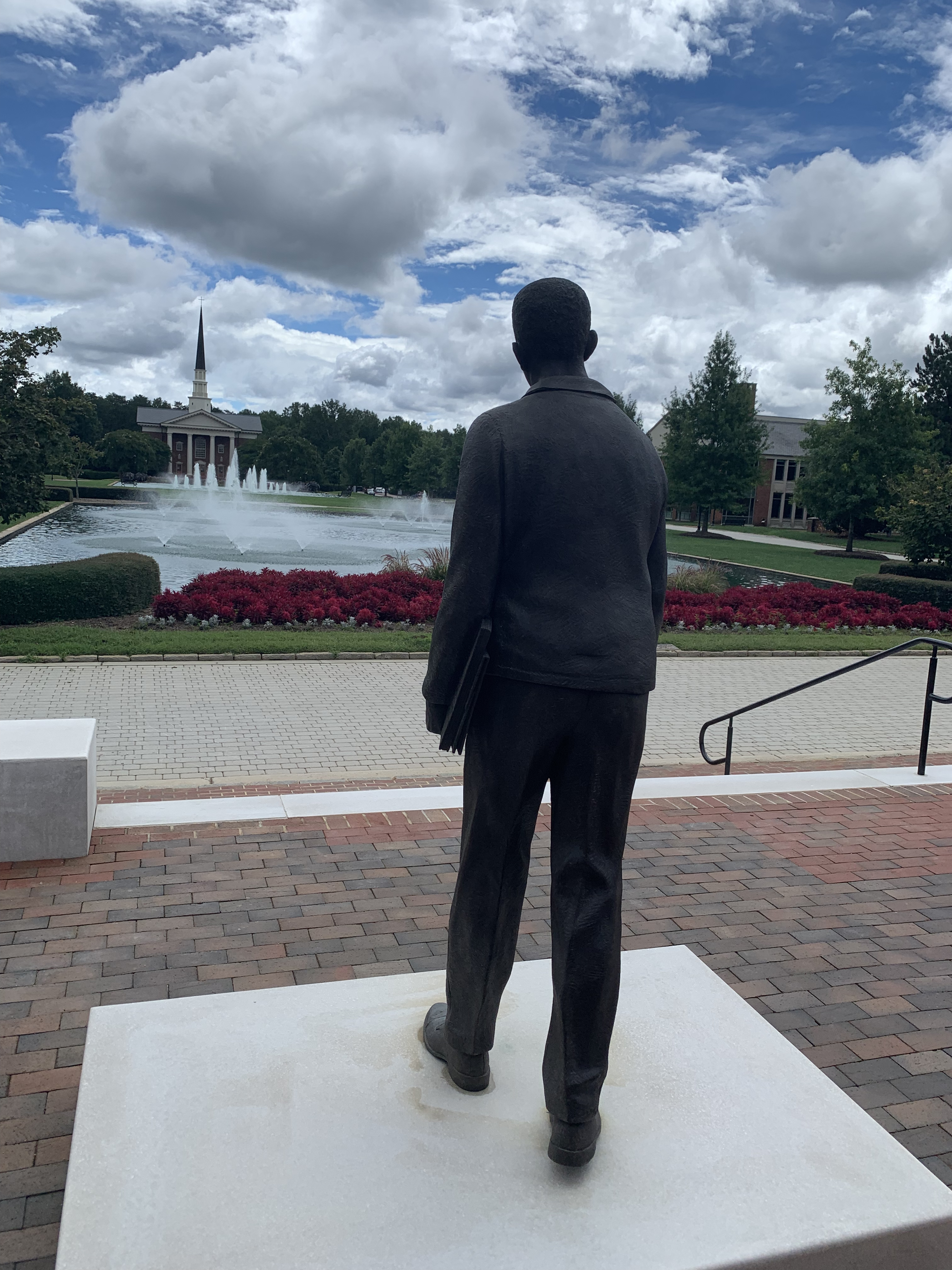
Standing above the central campus of Furman University, a sculpture of Joseph Vaughn ('68), the first African-American undergraduate. The statue was erected by the Board of Trustees as a reparative action in response to the Seeking Abraham report's documenting of slavery and historical harms in the university's past.

On October 26, 2016, Marian Baker wrote an article in the student newspaper The Paladin discussing the Furman family's history of slaveholding and questioning a plaque on the humanities building named in honor the university's first president, James C. Furman. In response, the university joined Universities Studying Slavery in 2017, commissioning a Task Force on Slavery and Justice. The task force's report came out a year later under the title "Seeking Abraham" with documentation of the university namesake Richard Furman's leadership in Baptist views on slavery, as well as responding to the questions regarding James C. Furman raised by Marian Baker. The title of the report refers to Abraham Sims, who was enslaved by the Furman family but was referred to as an "ex-slave" in a 1890 photo of the Furman home, the search for information on Abraham is used as an analogy for the reports wider goal of searching for the whole history of Furman University. The report also documented the movement of the university due to its reliance on funding from slavers, use of slave labor in building the original Greenville (South Carolina) campus, and the legacies of slavery up to the present day. It also focused on resistance to desegregation at the university, the experience of black students encountering racism and micro-aggressions, and limited African-American attendance throughout the twentieth century.

In response, the Furman University Board of Trustees voted to approve the report's accuracy and commit to repair historical harms, including a reparation scholarship that benefited African-American students, especially those who live in the historic locations of the college. Trustees installed a plaque that renamed the building "Furman Hall" instead of "James C. Furman Hall," and drew attention to the racist arguments Furman had used to support secession. An annual event Joseph Vaughn Day began in 2019 and a central plaza on campus Joseph Vaughn Plaza was installed in 2020. Clark Murphy Residential Housing Complex became the first building on campus named for an African-American person, a person enslaved by the Greenville Woman's College that merged with Furman University in the 1930s. The mission and values statement of the university was significantly altered the same year to reflect the university's changed perspective on its history, to say, "As we draw lessons from thoughtful consideration of our university’s past, we advocate respect for all people and actively welcome perspectives from a wide variety of backgrounds, cultures, and beliefs."

== Yale University ==
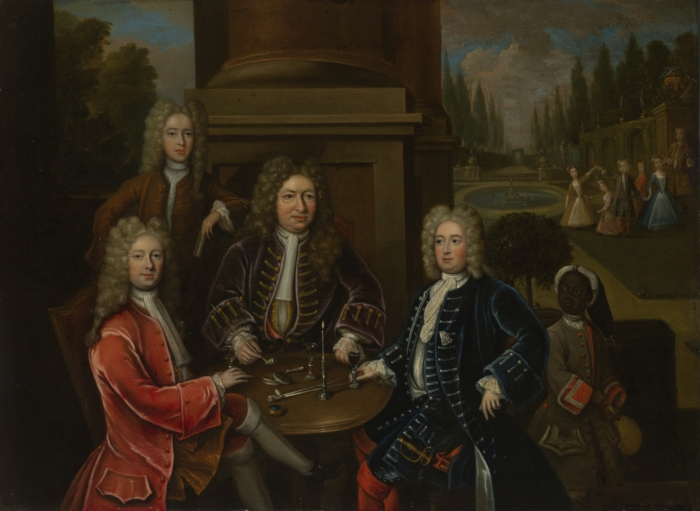
Elihu Yale and family with enslaved child

Yale University is named for slave trader and merchant Elihu Yale. According to historian Craig Steven Wilder, Yale also "inherited a small slave plantation in Rhode Island that it used to fund its first graduate programs and its first scholarships... [the university] aggressively sought out opportunities to benefit from the slave economies of New England and the broader Atlantic world."

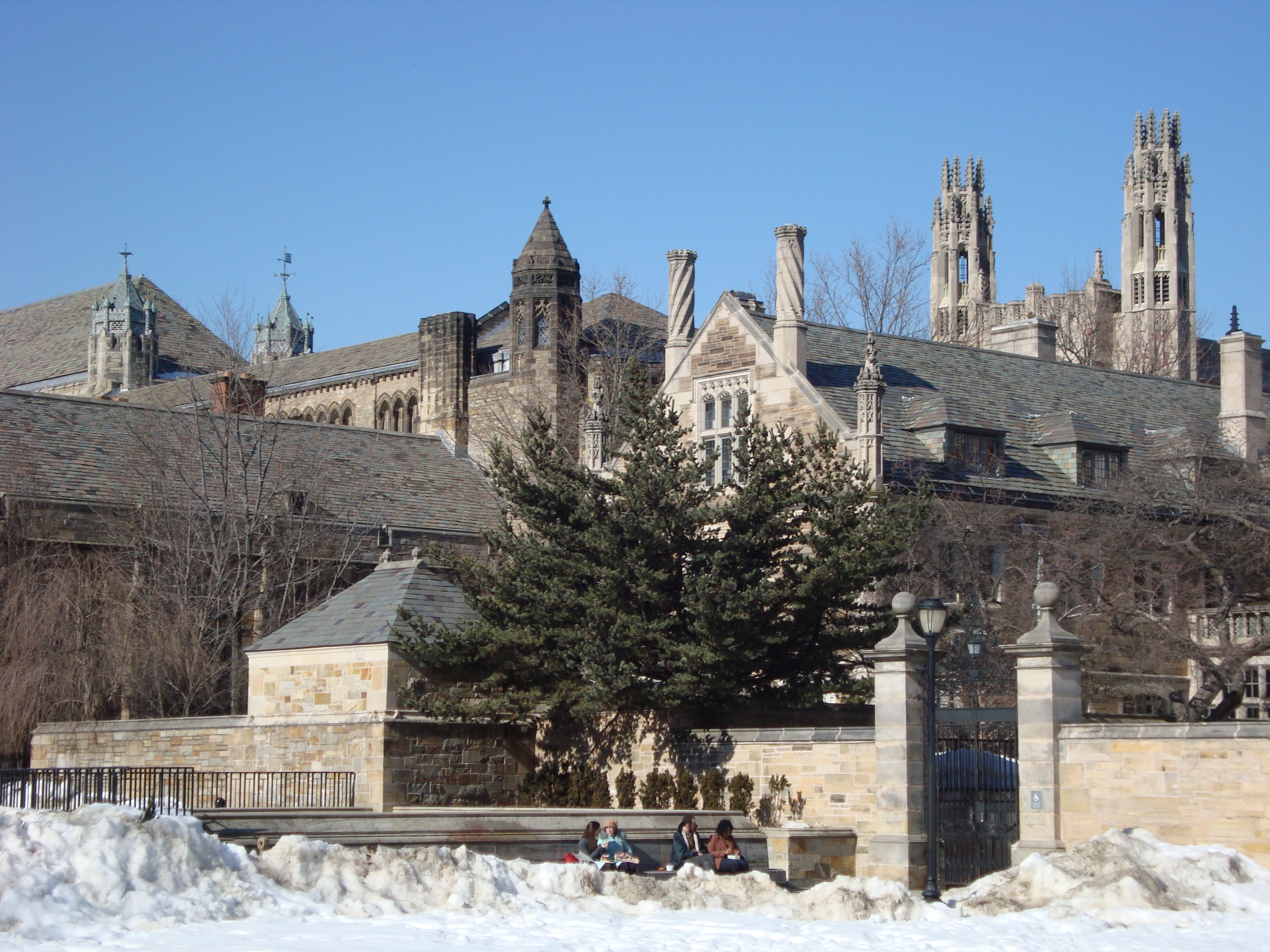
Yale's Berkeley College is named for slave owner George Berkeley.

In 1998, the university established the Gilder Lehrman Center for the Study of Slavery, Resistance, and Abolition at the MacMillan Center for International and Area Studies.

The legacy of slavery at Yale was addressed in the February 2002 edition of the Yale Alumni Magazine.

In 2017, following years of protest, Yale University renamed Calhoun College — one of its residential colleges — to Grace Hopper College. The college had previously been named for Vice President John C. Calhoun, a South Carolina slave owner and anti-abolitionist. Other buildings have retained the names of slave owners, including Bishop George Berkeley, Timothy Dwight and Ezra Stiles.

In 2024, Yale faculty member David W. Blight published a history of Yale and slavery.
