= 1838 Jesuit slave sale =

Sale by the Jesuits in Maryland

- Date: June 19, 1838 (first agreement); November 1838 (delivery)
- Location: Origin: Cecil, Charles, Prince George's, and St. Mary's counties, Maryland, U.S.; Destination: Ascension and Iberville parishes, Louisiana
- Participants: Thomas Mulledy; William McSherry; Henry Johnson; Jesse Batey

On June 19, 1838, the Maryland Province of the Society of Jesus agreed to sell 272 slaves to two Louisiana planters, Henry Johnson and Jesse Batey, for $115,000 (equivalent to approximately $3.34 million in 2024). This sale was the culmination of a contentious and long-running debate among the Maryland Jesuits over whether to keep, sell, or free their slaves, and whether to focus on their rural estates or on their growing urban missions, including their schools.

In 1836, the Jesuit superior general, Jan Roothaan, authorized the Maryland provincial superior to carry out the sale on three conditions: the slaves must be permitted to practice their Catholic faith, their families must not be separated, and the proceeds of the sale must be used only to support Jesuits in training. It soon became clear that Roothaan's conditions had not been fully met. The Jesuits ultimately received payment many years late and never received the full $115,000. Only 206 of the 272 slaves were delivered because the Jesuits permitted the elderly and those with spouses who were living nearby and not owned by Jesuits to remain in Maryland.

The sale prompted immediate outcry from fellow Jesuits. Some wrote emotional letters to Roothaan denouncing its immorality. Eventually, Roothaan removed Thomas Mulledy as provincial superior for disobeying orders and promoting scandal, exiling him to Nice for several years. Despite coverage of the Maryland Jesuits' slave ownership and the 1838 sale in academic literature, news of these facts came as a surprise to the public in 2015, prompting a study of Georgetown University's and the Jesuits' historical relationship with slavery. Georgetown and the College of the Holy Cross renamed buildings, Georgetown granted legacy admissions preference to the slaves' descendants, and the Jesuit Conference of Canada and the United States pledged to raise $100 million for them.

== Background ==
=== Emergence of Jesuit manors ===
Map of Jesuit sites in Maryland from the 17th to 19th centuries

The Society of Jesus, whose members are known as Jesuits, established its first presence in the Mid-Atlantic region of the Thirteen Colonies alongside the first settlers of the British Province of Maryland, which had been founded as a Catholic colony and refuge. Three Jesuits traveled aboard The Ark and The Dove on Lord Baltimore's voyage to settle Maryland in 1634. The Jesuits received land patents from Lord Baltimore in 1636, were gifted land in some Catholic Marylanders' wills, and purchased some land on their own, eventually becoming substantial landowners in the colony. As the sole ministers of Catholicism in Maryland at the time, the Jesuit estates became the centers of Catholicism. From these estates, the Jesuits traveled the countryside on horseback, administering the sacraments and catechizing the Catholic laity. They also established schools on their lands.

Much of this land was put to use as plantations, the revenue from which financed the Jesuits' ministries. While the plantations were initially worked by indentured servants, as the institution of indentured servitude began to fade away in Maryland, African slaves replaced indentured servants as the primary workers on the plantations. Many of these slaves were gifted to the Jesuits, while others were purchased. The first record of slaves working Jesuit plantations in Maryland dates to 1711, but it is likely that there were slave laborers on the plantations a generation before then. When the Society of Jesus was suppressed worldwide by Pope Clement XIV in 1773, ownership of the plantations was transferred from the Jesuits' Maryland Mission to the newly established Corporation of Roman Catholic Clergymen. (Note: The Corporation of Roman Catholic Clergymen was created in 1792 to preserve the property of the suppressed Jesuit order. The suppressed Jesuits did not want their property to be seized by the state, by the Propaganda Fide (which, since 1776, had ecclesiastical jurisdiction over the United States as a mission church), or by the Archbishop of Baltimore (whom the Propaganda Fide had ordered to take possession of all Jesuit property). The Jesuits hoped the Society of Jesus would eventually be restored and the corporation's property transferred to the Jesuit superior in America. Even after the Jesuits were restored in the United States and worldwide, the Corporation continued to exist and even expanded for some time, causing friction among those who renewed their Jesuit vows and those who did not.) Several of the Jesuits' slaves unsuccessfully attempted to sue for their freedom in the courts in the 1790s.

By 1824, the Jesuit plantations totaled more than 12,000 acres (4,900 hectares) in the State of Maryland, and 1,700 acres (690 hectares) in eastern Pennsylvania. These consisted primarily of the plantations of White Marsh in Prince George's County, St. Inigoes and Newtown Manor in St. Mary's County, St. Thomas Manor in Charles County, and Bohemia Manor in Cecil County. The main crops grown were tobacco and corn.

Due to these extensive landholdings, the Propaganda Fide in Rome had come to view the American Jesuits negatively, believing they lived lavishly like manorial lords. In reality, by the early 19th century, the Jesuit plantations were in such a state of mismanagement that in 1820, the Jesuit Superior General in Rome, Tadeusz Brzozowski, sent Irish Jesuit Peter Kenney as a canonical visitor to review the operations of the Maryland Mission. In addition to becoming physically dilapidated, all but one of the plantations had fallen into debt. On some plantations, the majority of slaves did not work because they were too young or old. The condition of slaves on the plantations varied over time, as did the condition of the Jesuits living with them. Kenney found the slaves facing arbitrary discipline, a meager diet, pastoral neglect, and engaging in vice. By the 1830s, their material and religious conditions had improved considerably.

One of the Maryland Jesuits' institutions, Georgetown College (later known as Georgetown University), also rented slaves. The school owned a small number of slaves in its early decades, but its main relationship with slavery was the leasing of slaves to work on campus, a practice that continued past the 1838 slave sale.

=== Debate over the slavery question ===
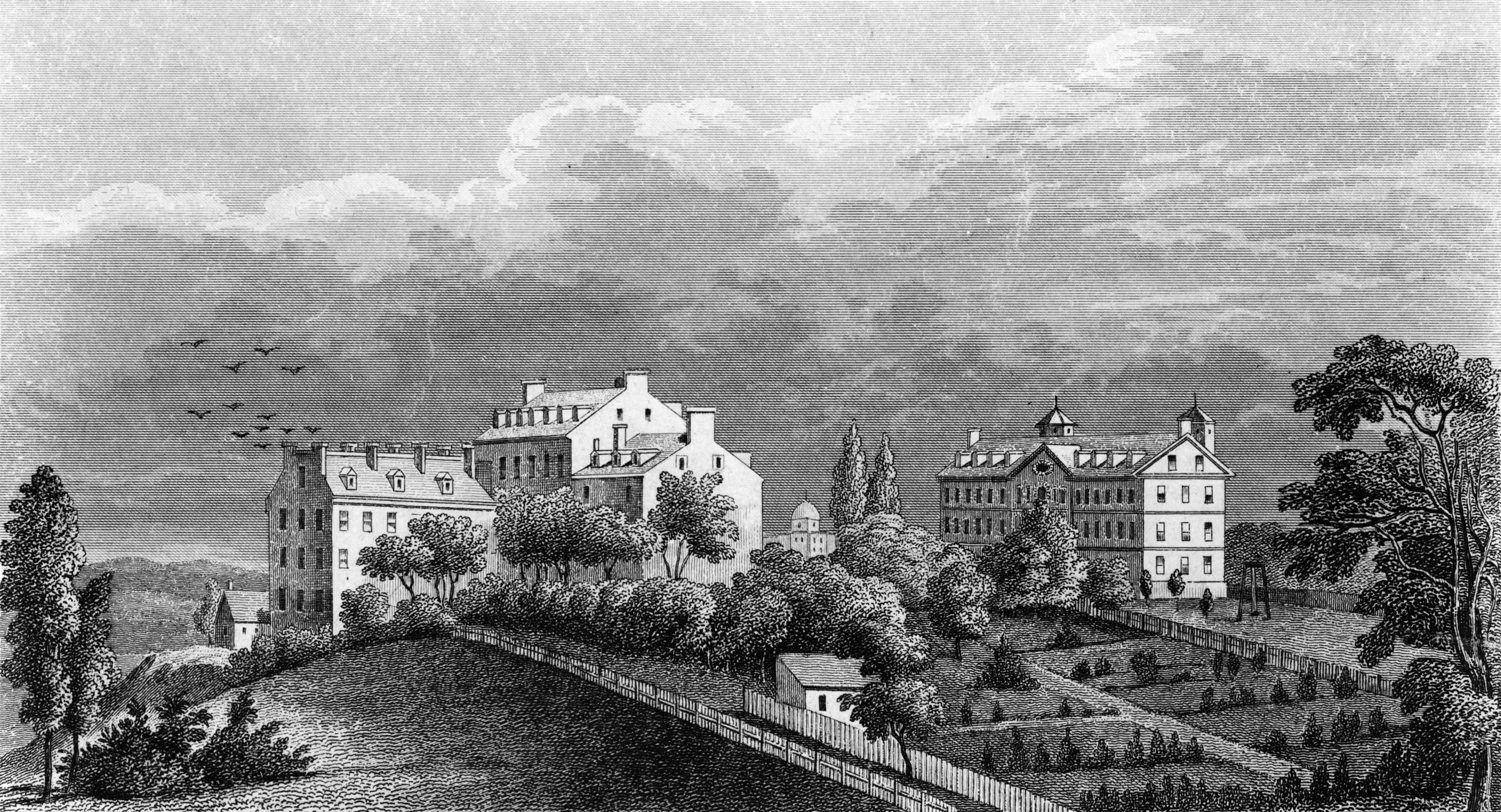
The Jesuits arguing in favor of a sale wanted to focus on their urban missions, including Georgetown College.

Beginning in 1800, there were instances of the Jesuit plantation managers freeing individual slaves or permitting slaves to purchase their freedom. As early as 1814, the trustees of the Corporation of Roman Catholic Clergymen discussed manumitting all their slaves and abolishing slavery on the Jesuit plantations, though in 1820, they decided against universal manumission. In 1830, the new Superior General, Jan Roothaan, returned Kenney to the United States, specifically to address the question of whether the Jesuits should divest themselves of their rural plantations altogether, which by this time had almost completely paid down their debts.

While Roothaan decided in 1831, based on the advice of the Maryland Mission superior, Francis Dzierozynski, that the Jesuits should maintain and improve their plantations rather than sell them, Kenney and his advisors (Thomas Mulledy, William McSherry, and Stephen Dubuisson) wrote to Roothaan in 1832 about the growing public opposition to slavery in the United States, and strongly urged Roothaan to allow the Jesuits to gradually free their slaves. Mulledy in particular felt that the plantations were a drain on the Maryland Jesuits; he urged selling the plantations as well as the slaves, believing the Jesuits were only able to support either their estates or their schools in growing urban areas: Georgetown College in Washington, D.C., and St. John's College in Frederick, Maryland.

Mulledy and McSherry became increasingly vocal in their opposition to Jesuit slave ownership. While they continued to support gradual emancipation, they believed that this option was becoming increasingly untenable, as the Maryland public's concern grew about the expanding number of free blacks. The two feared that because the public would not accept additional manumitted blacks, the Jesuits would be forced to sell their slaves en masse.

The Maryland Jesuits, having been elevated from a mission to the status of a province in 1833, held their first provincial congregation in 1835, where they considered again what to do with their plantations. The province was sharply divided, with the American-born Jesuits supporting a sale and the missionary European Jesuits opposing on the basis that it was immoral both to sell their patrimonial lands and to materially and morally harm the slaves by selling them into the Deep South, where they did not want to go. At the congregation, the senior Jesuits in Maryland voted six to four to proceed with a sale of the slaves, and Dubuisson submitted to the Superior General a summary of the moral and financial arguments on either side of the debate.

Meanwhile, in order to fund the province's operations, McSherry, as the first provincial superior of the Maryland Province, began selling small groups of slaves to planters in Louisiana in 1835, arguing that it was not possible to sell the slaves to local planters and that the buyers had assured him that they would not mistreat the slaves and would permit them to practice their Catholic faith.

== The sale ==
In October 1836, Roothaan officially authorized the Maryland Jesuits to sell their slaves, so long as three conditions were satisfied: the slaves were to be permitted to practice their Catholic faith, their families were not to be separated, and the proceeds of the sale had to be used to support Jesuits in training, rather than to pay down debts. McSherry delayed selling the slaves because their market value had greatly diminished as a result of the Panic of 1837, and because he was searching for a buyer who would agree to these conditions. In October of that year, Mulledy succeeded McSherry, who was dying, as provincial superior.

Mulledy quickly made arrangements to carry out the sale. He located two Louisiana planters who were willing to purchase the slaves: Henry Johnson, a former United States Senator and governor of Louisiana, and Jesse Batey. They were looking to buy slaves in the Upper South more cheaply than they could in the Deep South, and agreed to Mulledy's asking price of approximately $400 per person.

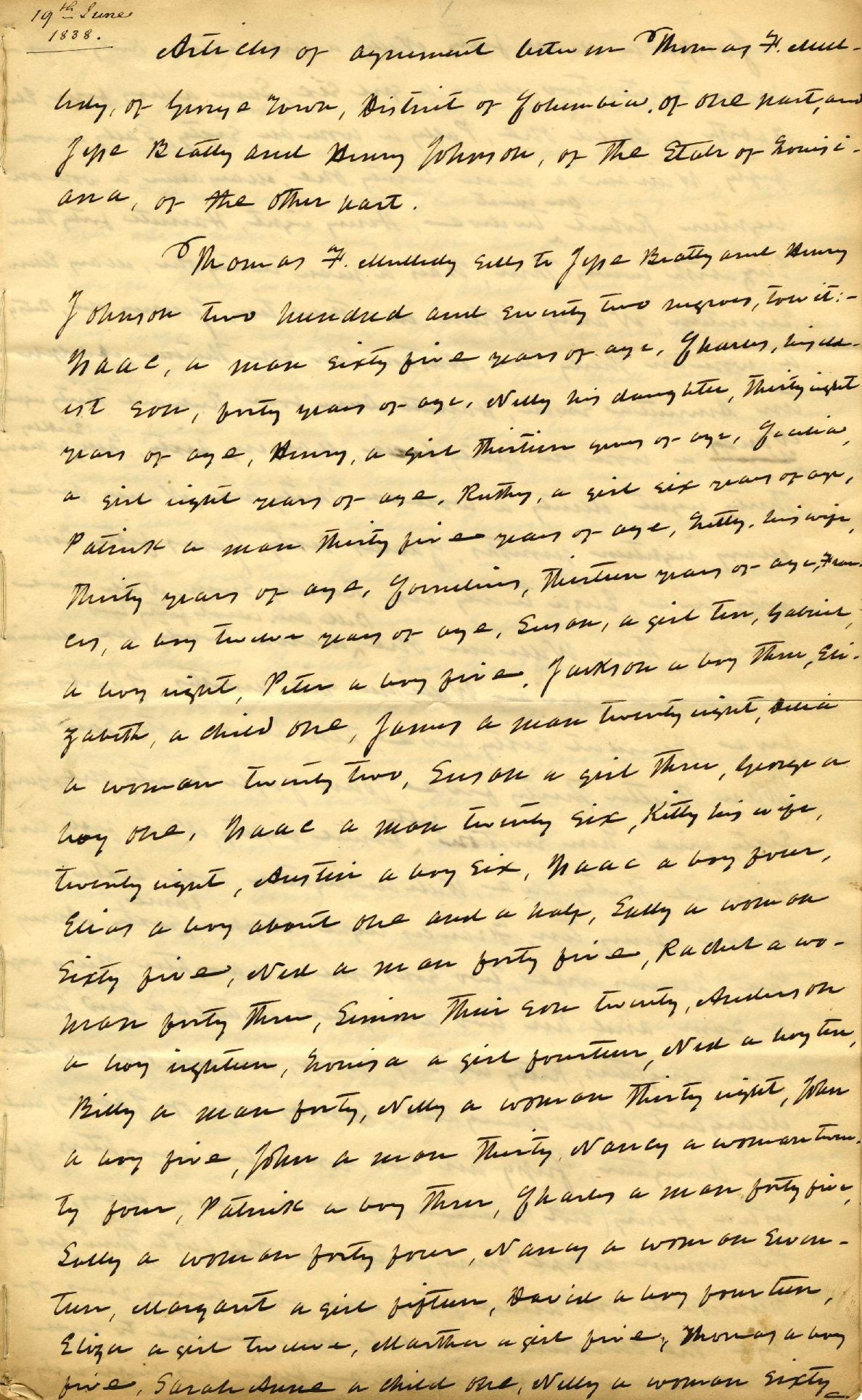
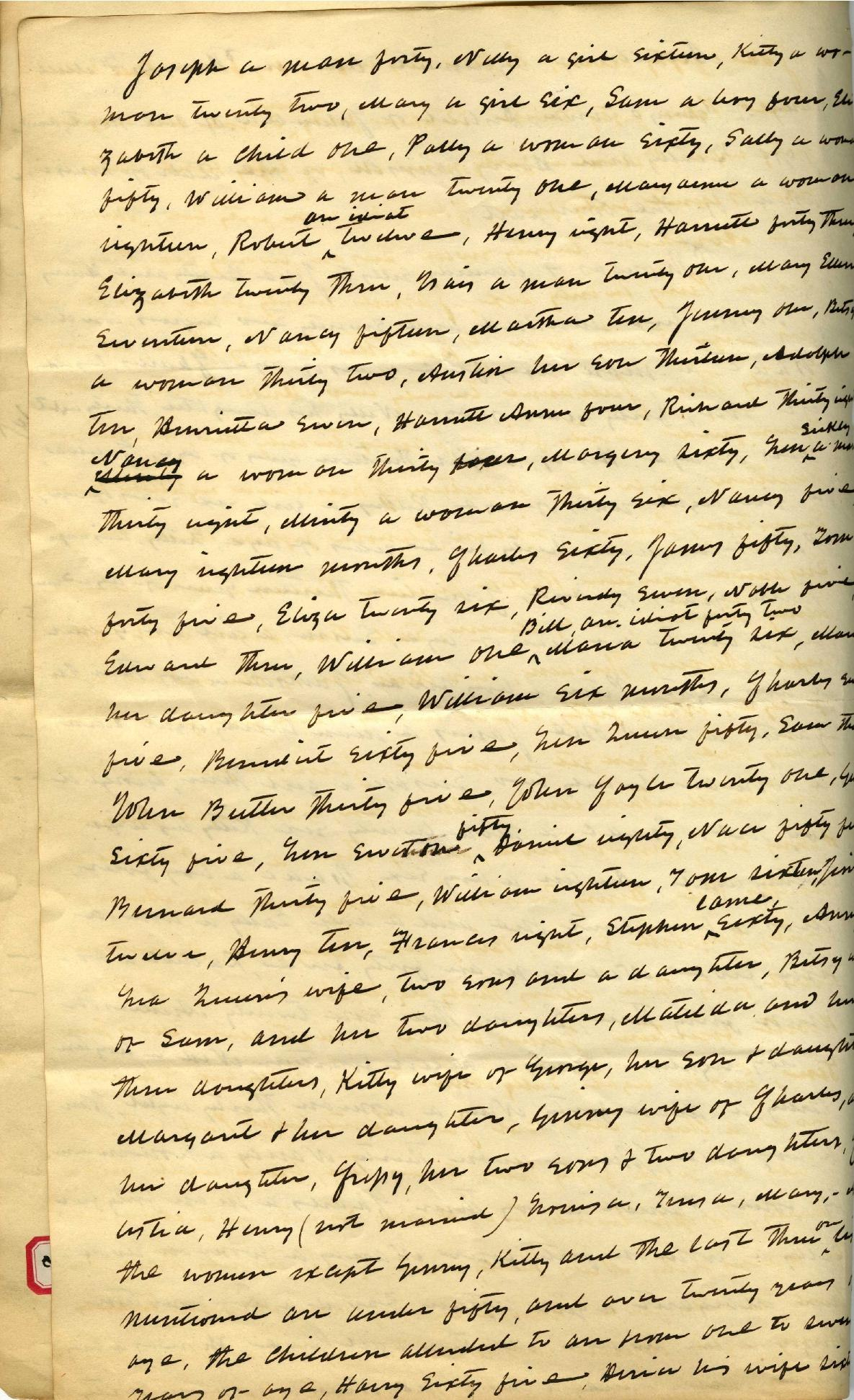
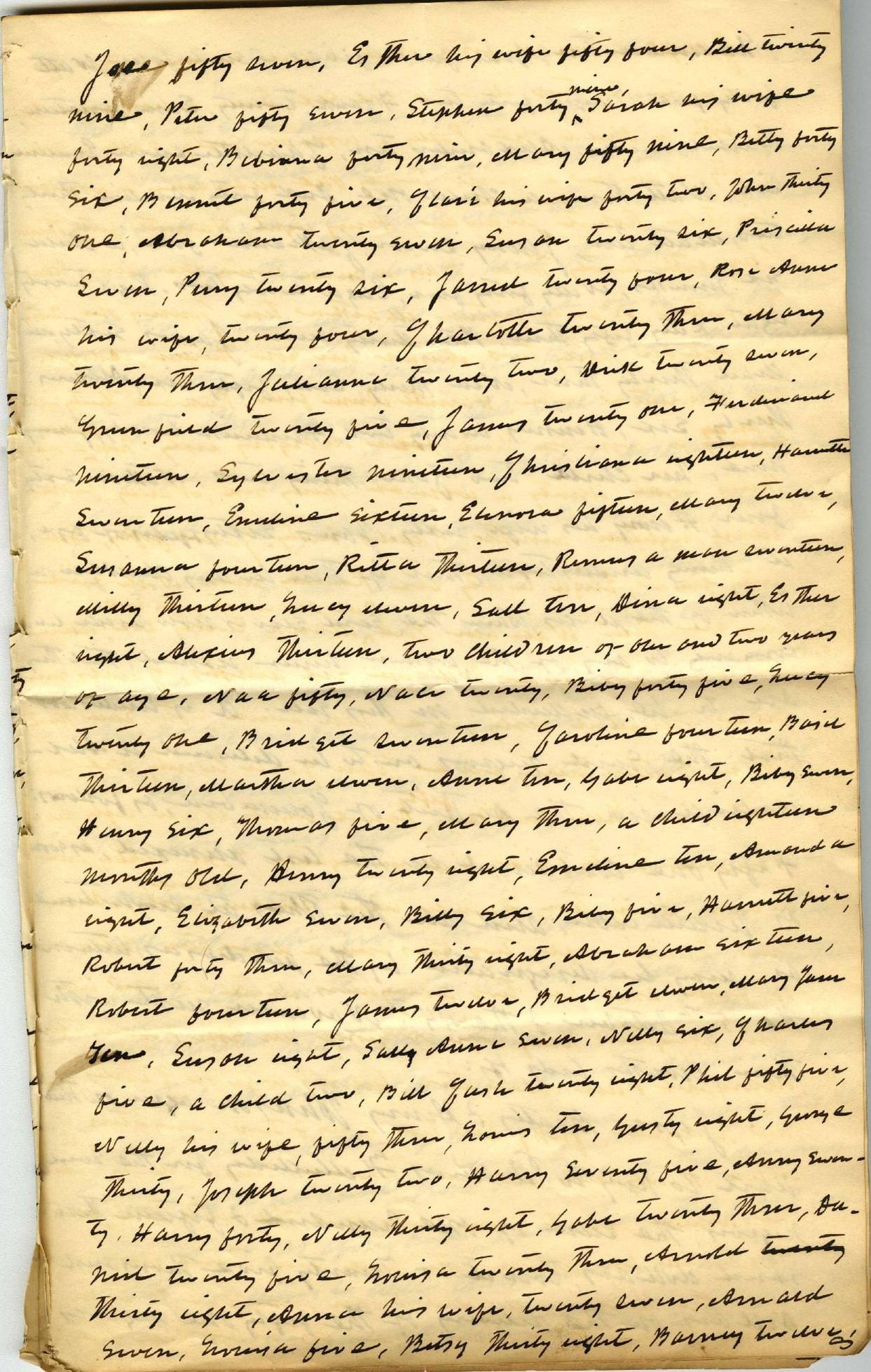
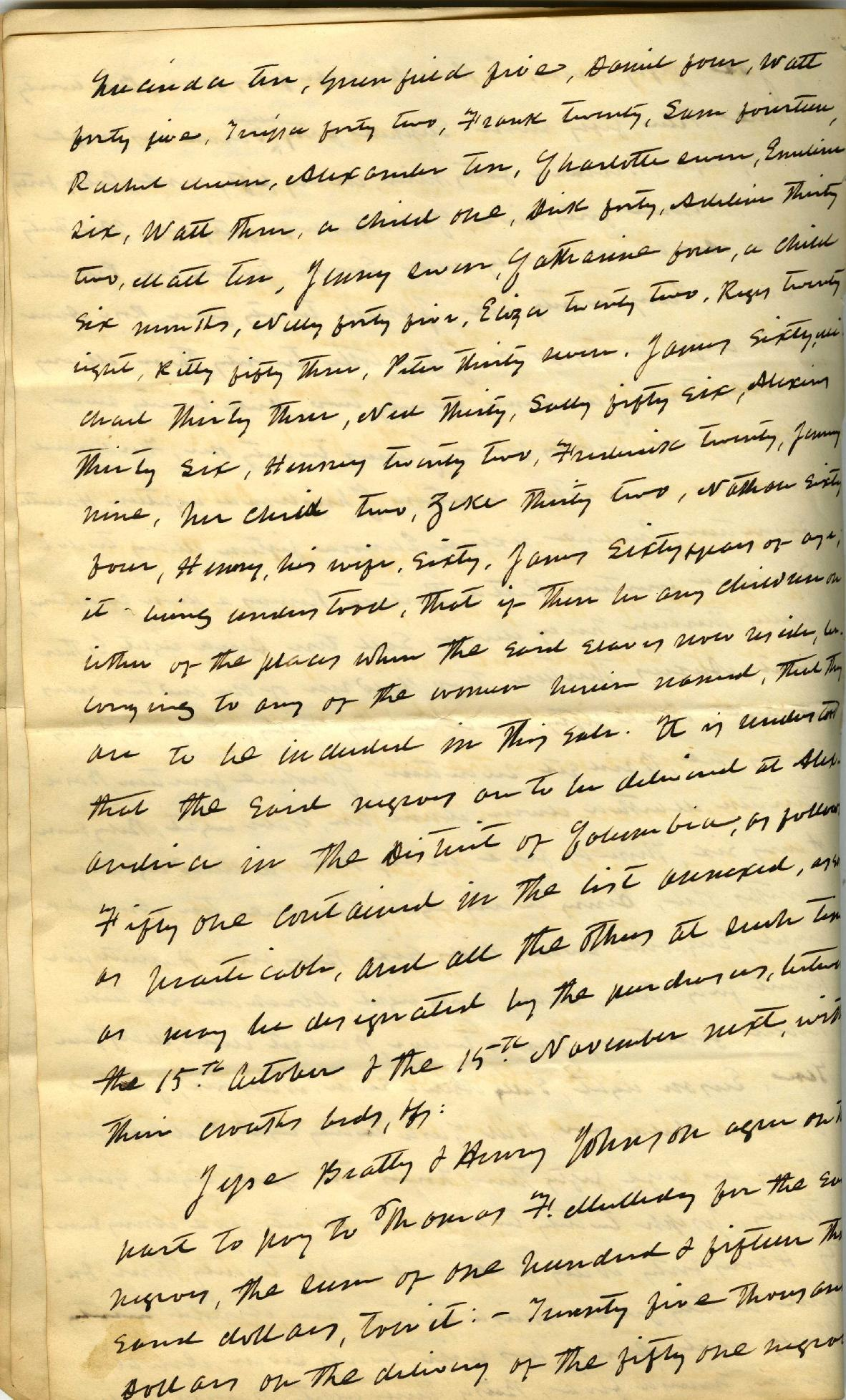
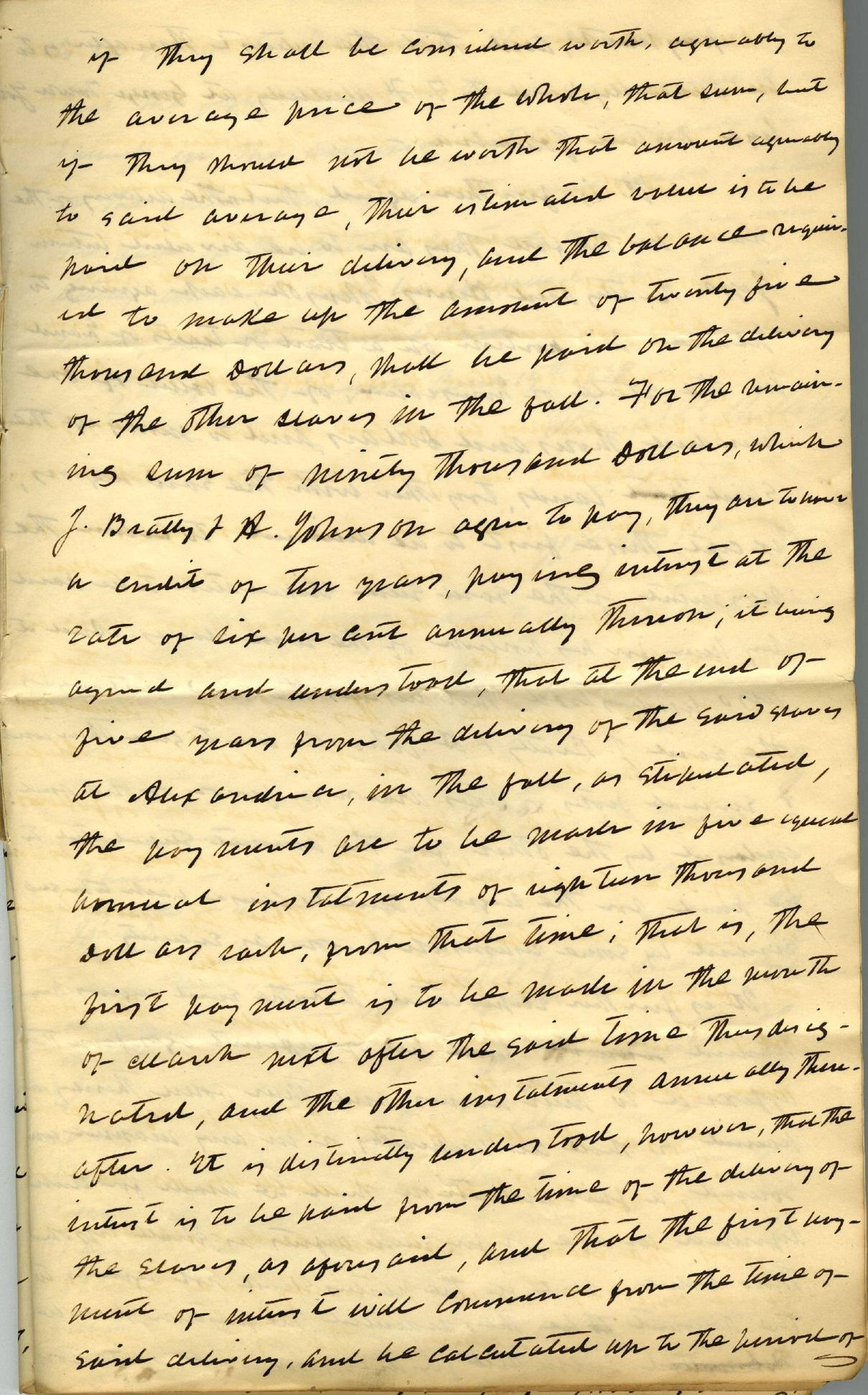
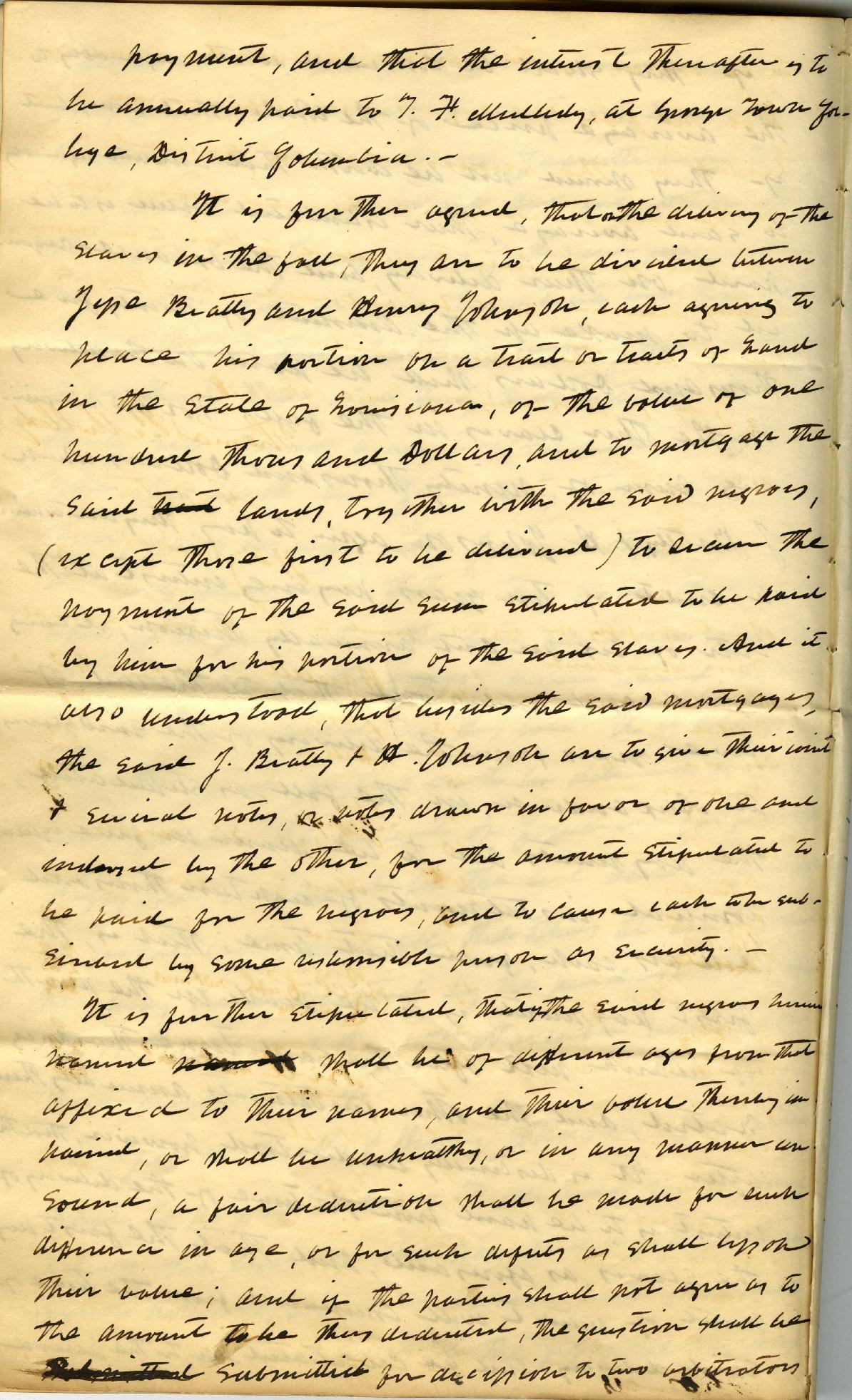
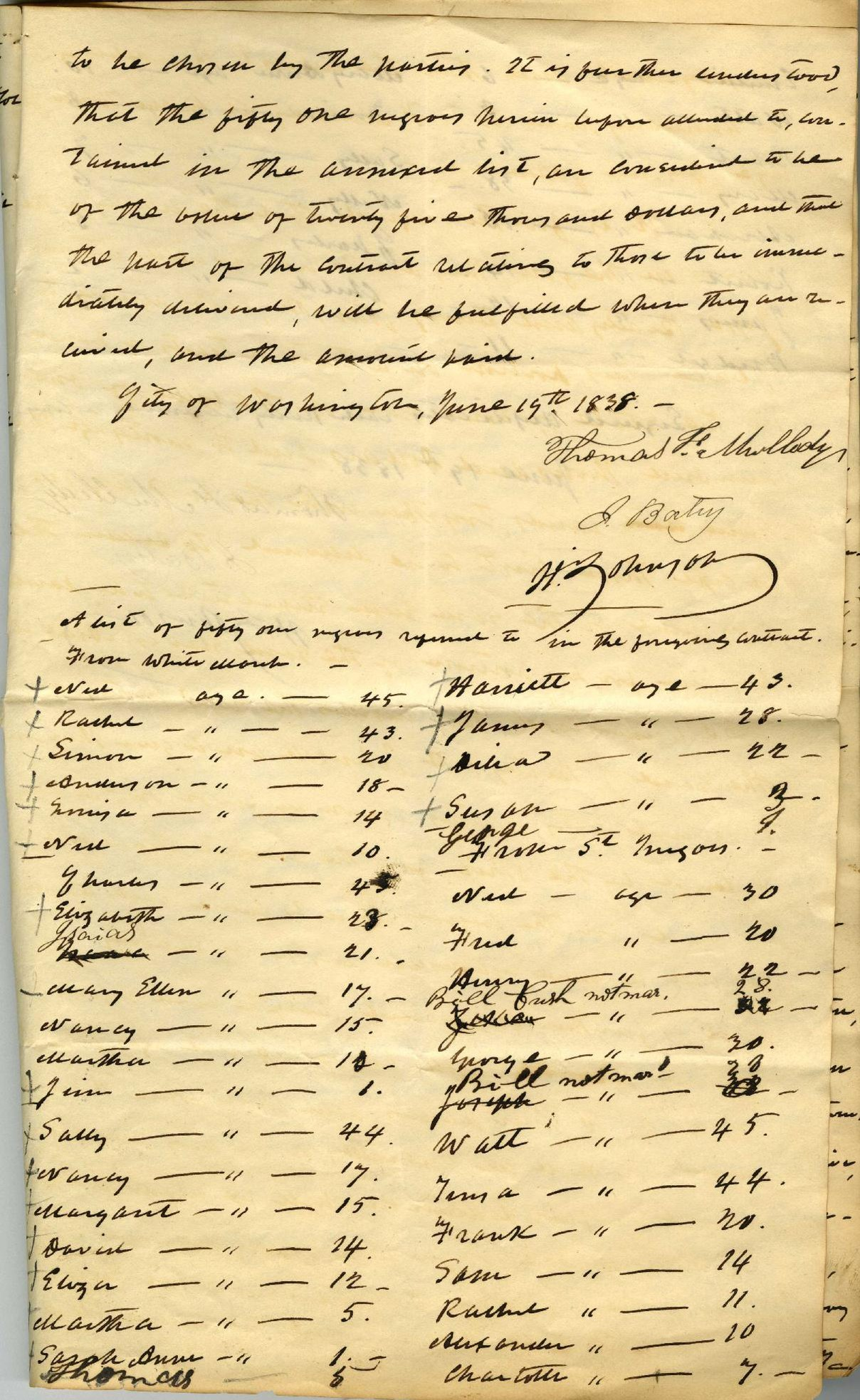
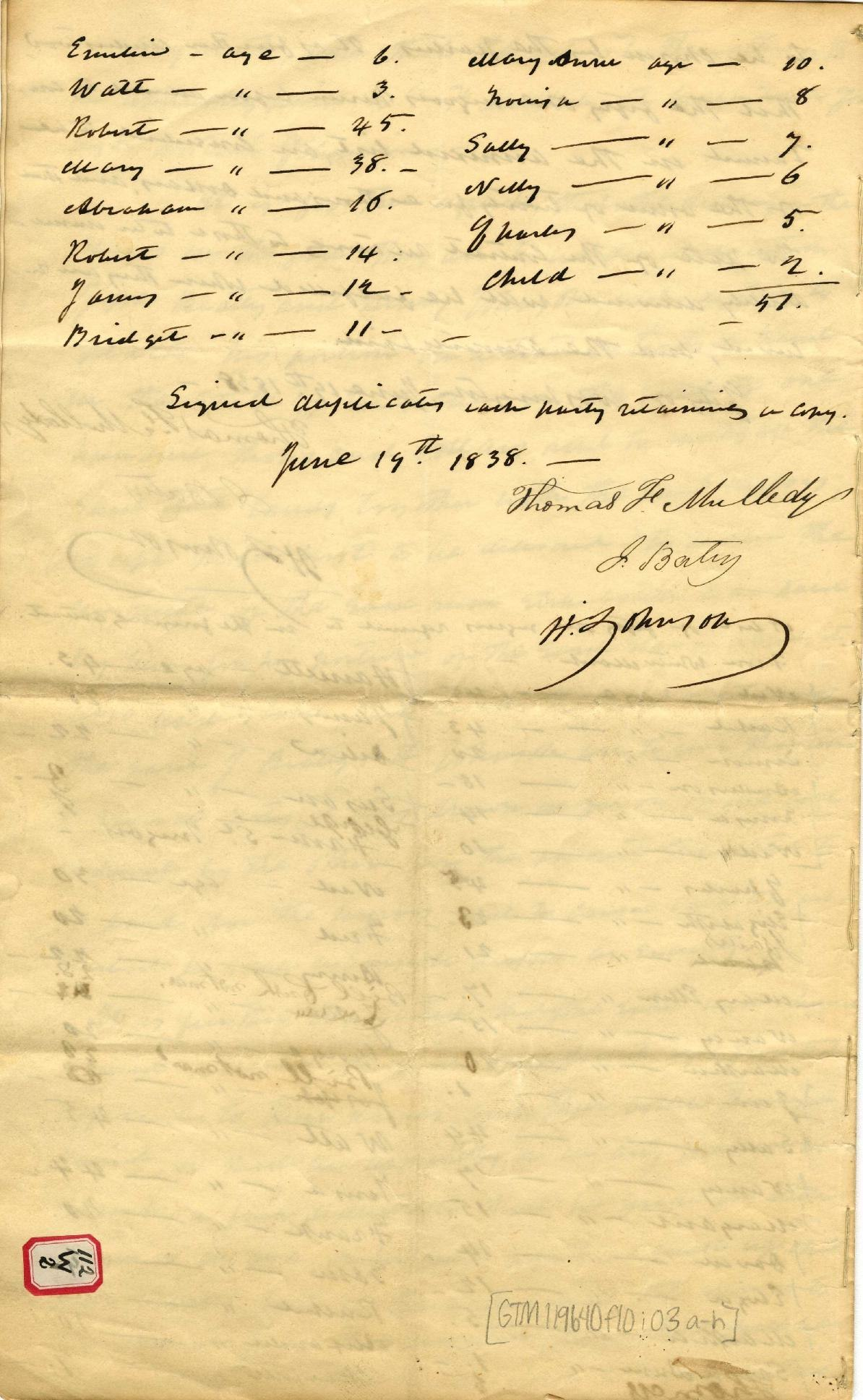
Articles of agreement for the 1838 sale

=== Terms of the agreement ===
On June 19, 1838, Mulledy, Johnson, and Batey signed articles of agreement formalizing the sale. Johnson and Batey agreed to pay $115,000, equivalent to $3.34 million in 2024, over the course of ten years plus six percent annual interest. In exchange, they would receive 272 slaves from the four Jesuit plantations in southern Maryland, constituting nearly all of the slaves owned by the Maryland Jesuits. Johnson and Batey were to be held jointly and severally liable and each additionally identified a responsible party as a guarantor. The slaves were also identified as collateral in the event that Johnson, Batey, and their guarantors defaulted on their payments.

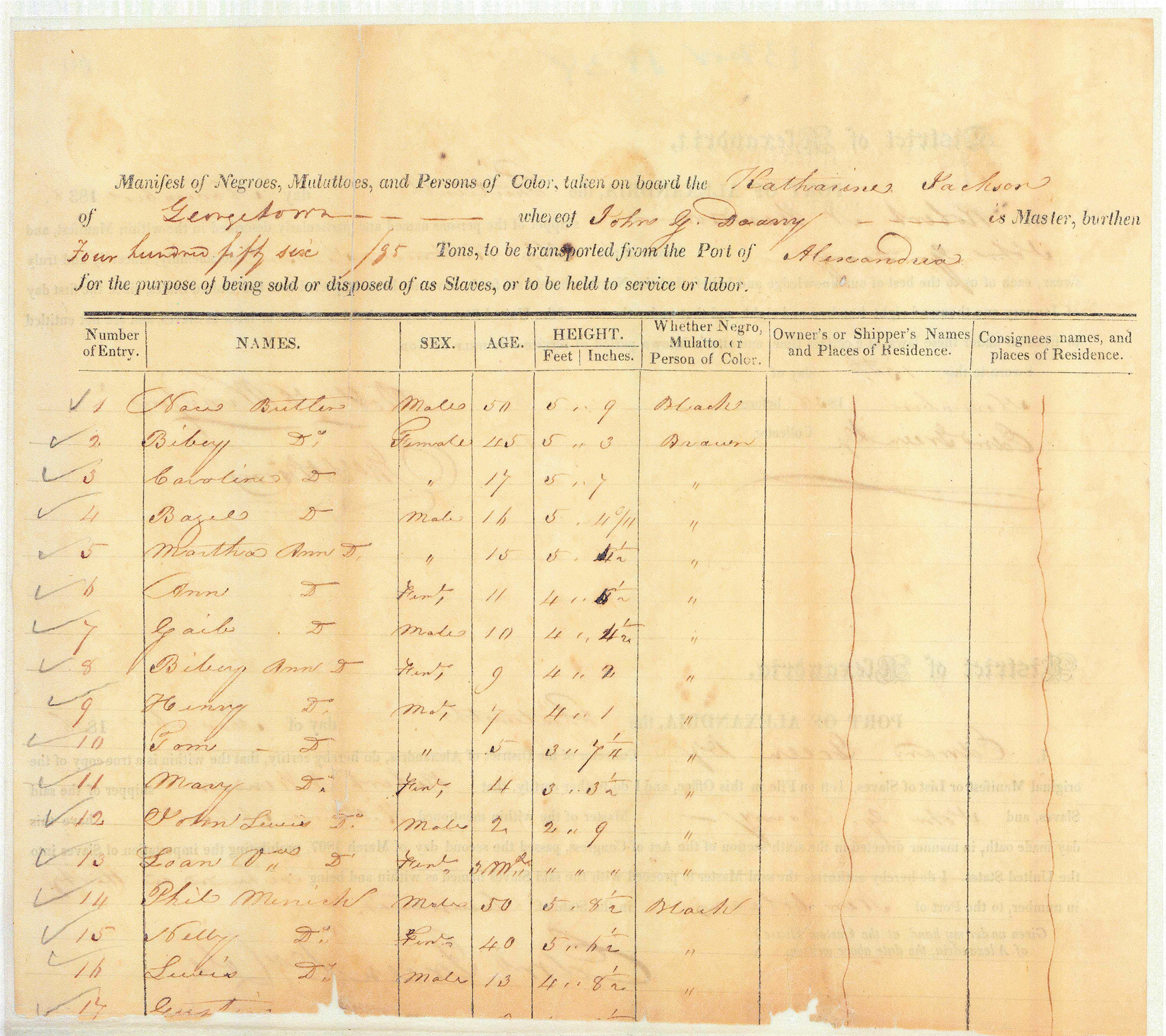
First page of the manifest of slaves carried aboard the Katherine Jackson to Louisiana

The articles of agreement listed each of the slaves being sold by name. More than half were younger than 20, and nearly a third were not yet 10 years old. The agreement provided that 51 slaves would be sent to the port of Alexandria, Virginia, in order to be shipped to Louisiana. Upon receipt of these 51, Johnson and Batey were to pay the first $25,000. The first payment on the remaining $90,000 would become due after five years. The remainder of the slaves were accounted for in three subsequent bills of sale executed in November 1838, which specified that 64 would go to Batey's plantation named West Oak in Iberville Parish and 140 slaves would be sent to Johnson's two plantations, Ascension Plantation (later known as Chatham Plantation) in Ascension Parish and another in Maringouin in Iberville Parish.

=== Delivery of the slaves ===
Anticipating that some of the Jesuit plantation managers who opposed the sale would encourage their slaves to flee, Mulledy, along with Johnson and a sheriff, arrived at each of the plantations unannounced to gather the first 51 slaves for transport. When Mulledy returned in November to gather the rest of the slaves, the plantation managers had their slaves flee and hide. The slaves Mulledy gathered were sent on the three-week voyage aboard the Katherine Jackson, which departed Alexandria on November 13 and arrived in New Orleans on December 6. Most of the slaves who fled returned to their plantations, and Mulledy made a third visit later that month, where he gathered some of the remaining slaves for transport.

Not all of the 272 slaves intended to be sold to Louisiana met that fate. In total, only 206 are known to have been transported to Louisiana. Several substitutions were made to the initial list of those to be sold, and 91 of those initially listed remained in Maryland. (Note: The number of slaves transported to Louisiana (206) and the number left in Maryland (91) add up to 297, not 272, because some of the 272 slaves initially identified to be sold were substituted with replacements.) There are several reasons many slaves were left behind. The Jesuits decided that the elderly would not be sold south and instead would be permitted to remain in Maryland. Other slaves were sold locally in Maryland so that they would not be separated from their spouses who were either free or owned by non-Jesuits, in compliance with Roothaan's order. Johnson allowed these slaves to remain in Maryland because he intended to return and try to buy their spouses as well. Some of the initial 272 slaves who were not delivered to Johnson were replaced with substitutes. An unknown number of slaves may also have run away and escaped transportation.

== Aftermath ==
=== Scandal and reproach ===
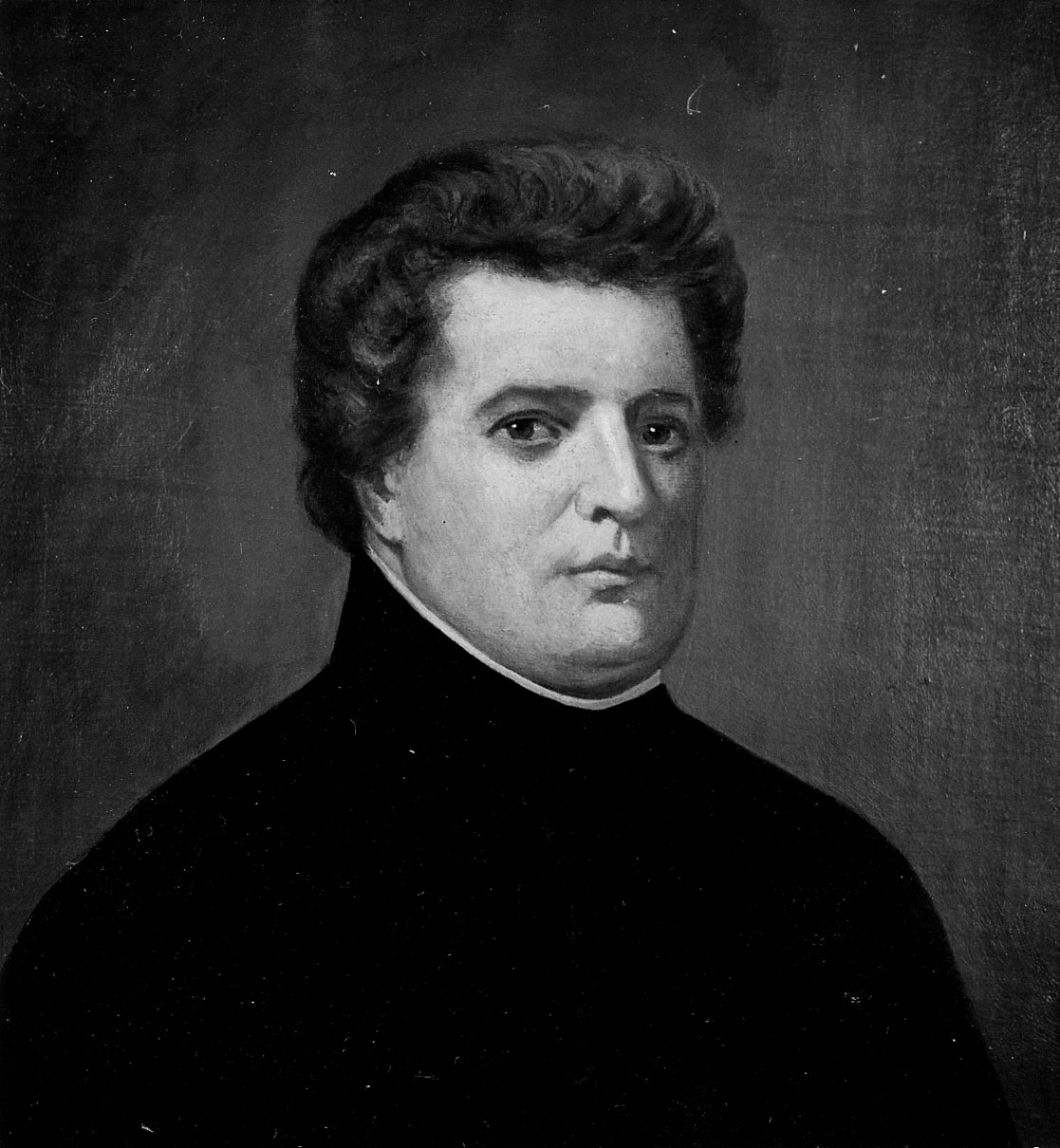
Thomas F. Mulledy was rebuked by many of his fellow Jesuits following the sale.

Almost immediately, the sale, which was one of the largest slave sales in the history of the United States, became a scandal among American Catholics. Many Maryland Jesuits were outraged by the sale, which they considered to be immoral, and many of them wrote graphic, emotional accounts of the sale to Roothaan. Benedict Fenwick, a Jesuit and the Bishop of Boston, privately lamented the fate of the slaves and considered the sale an extreme measure. Dubuisson described how the public reputation of the Jesuits in Washington and Virginia declined as a result of the sale. Other Jesuits voiced their anger to the Archbishop of Baltimore, Samuel Eccleston, who conveyed this to Roothaan. During the controversy, Mulledy fell into alcoholism.

Soon after the sale, Roothaan decided that Mulledy should be removed as provincial superior. Roothaan was particularly concerned because it had become clear that, contrary to his order, families had been separated by the slaves' new owners. In the years after the sale, it also became clear that most of the slaves were not permitted to carry on their Catholic faith because they were living on plantations far removed from any Catholic church or priest. While McSherry initially persuaded Roothaan to forgo removing Mulledy, in August 1839, Roothaan resolved that Mulledy must be removed to quell the ongoing scandal. He demanded that Mulledy travel to Rome to answer the charges of disobeying orders and promoting scandal. He ordered McSherry to inform Mulledy that he had been removed as provincial superior, and that if Mulledy refused to step down, he would be dismissed from the Society of Jesus.

Before Roothaan's order reached Mulledy, Mulledy had already accepted the advice of McSherry and Eccleston in June 1839 to resign and go to Rome to defend himself before Roothaan. As censure for the scandal, Roothaan ordered Mulledy to remain in Europe, and Mulledy lived in exile in the Savoyard city of Nice until 1843.

=== Financial outcome ===
While Roothaan ordered that the proceeds of the sale be used to provide for the training of Jesuits, the initial $25,000 was not used for that purpose. Of the sum, $8,000 was used to satisfy a financial obligation that, following a long-running and contentious dispute, Pope Pius VII had previously determined the Maryland Jesuits owed to Archbishop Ambrose Maréchal of Baltimore and his successors. The remaining $17,000, equivalent to approximately $490,000 in 2024, was used to offset part of Georgetown College's $30,000 of debt that had accrued during the construction of buildings during Mulledy's prior presidency of the college. However, the remainder of the money received did go to funding Jesuit formation.

Johnson was unable to pay according to the schedule of the agreement. As a result, he had to sell his property in the 1840s and renegotiate the terms of his payment. He was allowed to continue paying well beyond the ten years initially allowed, and continued to do so until just before the Emancipation Proclamation in 1862, during the Civil War. The Jesuits never received the total $115,000 that was owed under the agreement.

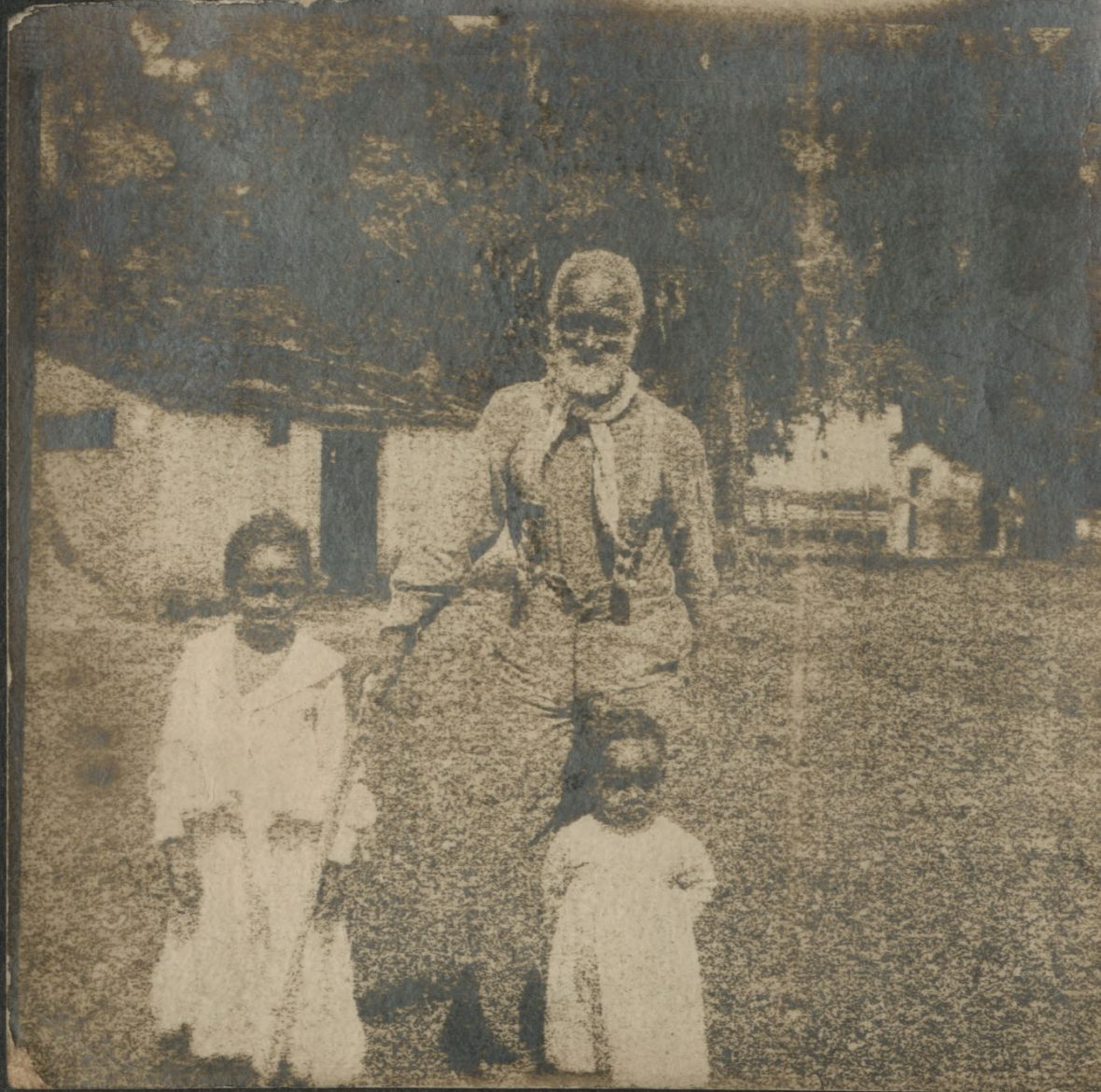
Frank Campbell (top) was sold by the Jesuits.

=== Subsequent fate of the slaves ===
Before the abolition of slavery in the United States in 1865, many slaves sold by the Jesuits changed ownership several times. Following Batey's death, his West Oak plantation and the slaves living there were sold in January 1853 to Tennessee politician Washington Barrow and Barrow's son, John S. Barrow, a resident of Baton Rouge, Louisiana. In 1856, Washington Barrow sold the slaves he purchased from Batey to William Patrick and Joseph B. Woolfolk of Iberville Parish. Patrick and Woolfolk's slaves were then sold in July 1859 to Emily Sparks, the widow of Austin Woolfolk. Due to financial difficulties, Johnson sold half his property, including some of the slaves he had purchased in 1838, to Philip Barton Key in 1844. Key then transferred this property to John R. Thompson. In 1851, Thompson purchased the second half of Johnson's property, so that by the beginning of the Civil War, all the slaves sold by Mulledy to Johnson were owned by Thompson.

== Legacy ==
=== Historiography ===
While the 1838 slave sale gave rise to scandal at the time, the event eventually faded out of public awareness. However, the history of the sale and the Jesuits' slave ownership was never secret. It is one of the most well-documented slave sales of its era. There was periodic and sometimes extensive coverage of both the sale and the Jesuits' slave ownership in various literature. Articles in the Woodstock Letters, an internal Jesuit publication that later became accessible to the public, routinely addressed both subjects during the course of its existence from 1872 to 1969. The 1970s saw an increase in public scholarship on the Maryland Jesuits' slave ownership. In 1977, the Maryland Province named Georgetown's Lauinger Library as the custodian of its historic archives, which were made available to the public through the Georgetown University Library, Saint Louis University Library, and Maryland State Library.

In 1981, historian Robert Emmett Curran presented comprehensive research into the Maryland Jesuits' participation in slavery at academic conferences, and published this research in 1983. Curran also published Georgetown University's official bicentennial history in 1993, in which he wrote about the university's and the Jesuits' relationship with slavery. Other historians covered the subject in literature published between the 1980s and 2000s. In 1996, the Jesuit Plantation Project was established by historians at Georgetown, which made available to the public, via the internet, digitized versions of much of the Maryland Jesuits' archives, including the articles of agreement for the 1838 sale.

=== Return to public awareness ===
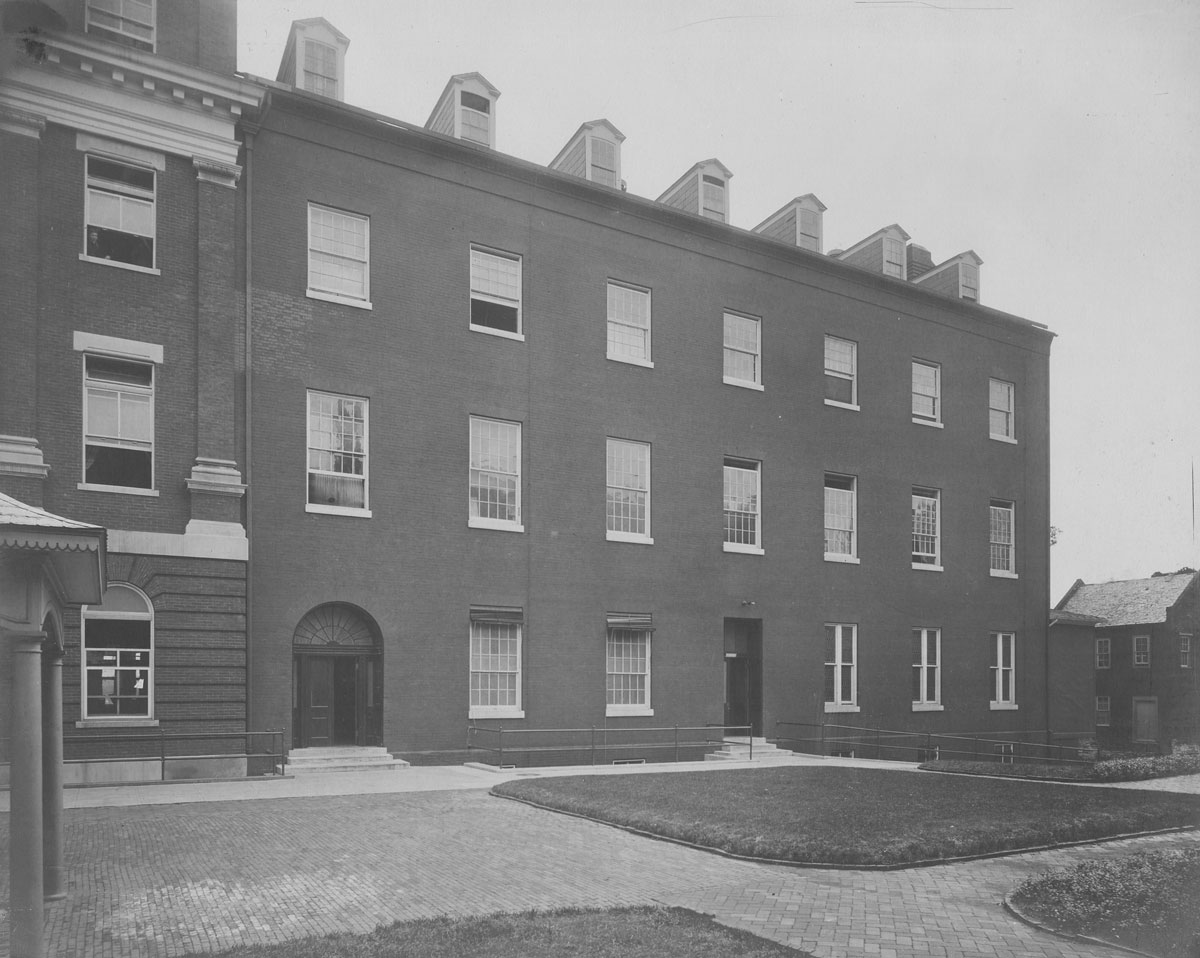
Mulledy Hall, now Isaac Hawkins Hall, at Georgetown in 1898

The 1838 slave sale returned to the public's awareness in the mid-2010s. In 2013, Georgetown began planning to renovate the adjacent Ryan, Mulledy, and Gervase Halls, which together served as the university's Jesuit residence until the opening of a new residence, Wolfington Hall, in 2003. After the Jesuits vacated the buildings, Ryan and Mulledy Halls lay vacant, while Gervase Hall was put to other use. In 2014, renovation began on Ryan and Mulledy Halls to convert them into a student residence.

With work complete, in August 2015, university president John DeGioia sent an open letter to the university announcing the opening of the new student residence, which also related Mulledy's role in the 1838 slave sale after stepping down as president of the university. Despite the decades of scholarship on the subject, this revelation came as a surprise to many Georgetown University members, and some criticized the retention of Mulledy's name on the building. Between 2014 and 2015, several articles in the school newspaper, The Hoya, also brought the university's relationship with slavery and the slave sale to public attention.

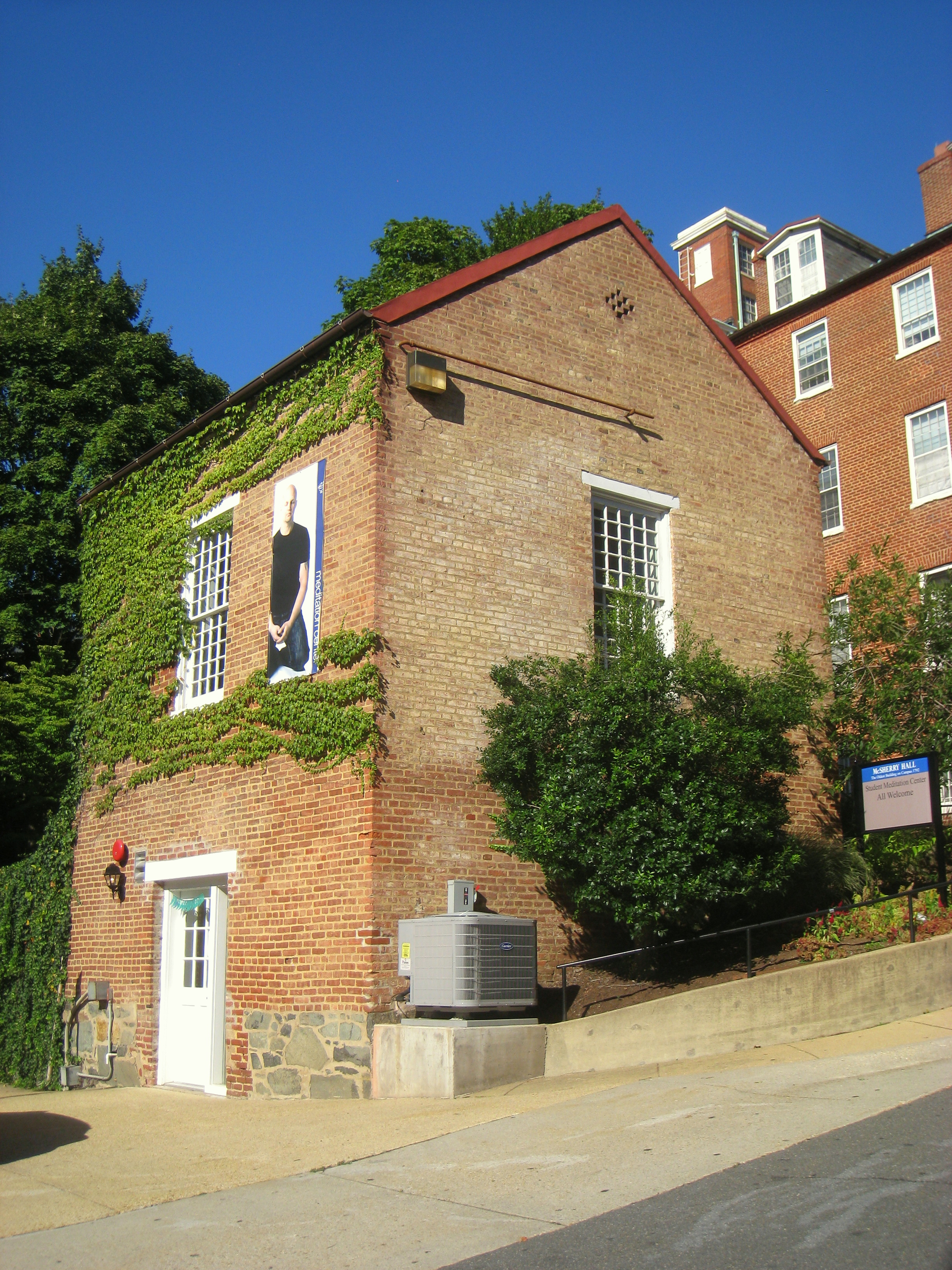
Anne Marie Becraft Hall, known until 2015 as McSherry Hall

==== Renaming halls ====
In September 2015, DeGioia convened a Working Group on Slavery, Memory, and Reconciliation to study the slave sale and recommend how to treat it in the present day. In November of that year, following a student-led protest and sit-in, the working group recommended that the university temporarily rename Mulledy Hall (which opened during Mulledy's presidency in 1833) to Freedom Hall, and McSherry Hall (which opened in 1792 and housed a meditation center) to Remembrance Hall. On November 14, 2015, DeGioia announced that he and the university's board of directors accepted the working group's recommendation, and would rename the buildings accordingly. This coincided with a protest by a group of students against keeping Mulledy's and McSherry's names on the buildings the day before. In 2016, The New York Times published an article that brought the history of the Jesuits' and university's relationship with slavery to national attention.

The College of the Holy Cross in Massachusetts, of which Mulledy was the first president from 1843 to 1848, also began to reconsider the name of one of its buildings in 2015. Mulledy Hall, a student dormitory that opened in 1966, was renamed as Brooks–Mulledy Hall in 2016, adding the name of a later president, John E. Brooks, who worked to racially integrate the college. In 2020, the college removed Mulledy's name.

On April 18, 2017, DeGioia, along with the provincial superior of the Maryland Province, and the president of the Jesuit Conference of Canada and the United States, held a liturgy in which they formally apologized on behalf of their respective institutions for their participation in slavery. The university also gave permanent names to the two buildings. Freedom Hall became Isaac Hawkins Hall, after the first slave listed on the articles of agreement for the 1838 sale. Remembrance Hall became Anne Marie Becraft Hall, after a free black woman who founded a school for black girls in the Georgetown neighborhood and later joined the Oblate Sisters of Providence.

==== Additional developments ====
Georgetown University also extended to descendants of slaves who the Jesuits owned or whose labor benefitted the university the same preferential legacy status in university admission given to children of Georgetown alumni. This admissions preference has been described by historian Craig Steven Wilder as the most significant measure recently taken by a university to account for its historical relationship with slavery. Several groups of descendants have been created, which have lobbied Georgetown University and the Society of Jesus for reparations, and groups have disagreed with the form that their desired reparations should take.

In 2019, undergraduate students at Georgetown voted in a non-binding referendum to impose a symbolic reparations fee of $27.20 per student. The university instead decided to raise $400,000 per year in voluntary donations for the benefit of descendants. In 2021, the Jesuit Conference of Canada and the United States pledged to raise $100 million for a newly created Descendants Truth and Reconciliation Foundation, which would aim to ultimately raise $1 billion, with the purpose of working for the benefit of descendants of all slaves owned by the Jesuits. Georgetown also donated $1 million to the foundation and another $400,000 to create a charitable fund to pay for healthcare and education in Maringouin, Louisiana.

== See also ==
- Great Slave Auction
- Slavery at American colleges and universities
- History of Georgetown University
- Domestic slave trade
- History of slavery in Louisiana
- Catholic Church and slavery
