= Jesuit Schools Network =

Organization of North American secondary schools

The Jesuit Schools Network of North America (JSN) is the membership organization for secondary and pre-secondary schools run by the Society of Jesus in North America. It is affiliated with the Jesuit Conference of Canada and the United States and is a member of the Jesuit Global Network of Schools. Based in Washington, D.C., JSN serves 55,000 students in 90 Jesuit schools throughout Canada and the United States, and in Belize and the Federated States of Micronesia. The three models of Jesuit education in North America are Nativity schools, Cristo Rey high schools, and Jesuit middle and high schools.

== History ==
The Network’s predecessor, the Jesuit Educational Association (JEA), was founded in 1936 to serve the apostolate of secondary and postsecondary schools in the United States. In 1970, the JEA split into the Association of Jesuit Colleges and Universities and the Jesuit Secondary Education Association (JSEA). In 2015, the JSEA was restructured under the Jesuit Conference of Canada and the United States and renamed to the Jesuit Schools Network of North America (JSN).

== Leadership ==
Seven Jesuits led the JSEA as president: Edwin J. McDermott, S.J., Vincent J. Duminuco, S.J., Charles P. Costello, S.J., Carl E. Meirose, S.J., Joseph F. O’Connell, S.J., Ralph E. Metts, S.J. and James A. Stoeger, S.J.

William H. Muller, S.J., served as the first executive director of JSN, and Robert E. Reiser, S.J., has served as executive director since 2021.
