= Henry Johnson (Louisiana politician) =

Governor of Louisiana (1783–1864)

Henry S. Johnson
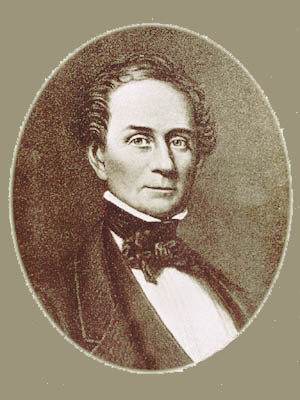

United States Senator from Louisiana
- In office February 12, 1844 – March 3, 1849
- Preceded by: Alexander Porter
- Succeeded by: Pierre Soulé
- In office January 12, 1818 – May 27, 1824
- Preceded by: William C.C. Claiborne
- Succeeded by: Dominique Bouligny

Member of the U.S. House of Representatives from Louisiana's 1st district
- In office December 1, 1834 – March 3, 1839
- Preceded by: Edward Douglass White, Sr.
- Succeeded by: Edward Douglass White, Sr.

5th Governor of Louisiana
- In office December 13, 1824 – December 15, 1828
- Preceded by: Henry S. Thibodaux
- Succeeded by: Pierre Derbigny

Personal details
- Born: September 14, 1783 Virginia
- Died: September 4, 1864 (aged 80) Pointe Coupee Parish, Louisiana, U.S.
- Party: Democratic-Republican, National Republican, Whig
- Spouse: Elizabeth Rousby Key

Henry S. Johnson (September 14, 1783 – September 4, 1864) was an American attorney and politician who served as the fifth governor of Louisiana (1824–1828). He also served as a United States representative and as a United States senator. He participated in the slave trade in the United States.

== Early life ==
Johnson was born in Virginia. His family is said to have resided in southern Virginia, where Johnson completed academic study and became a member of Virginia bar. He was Episcopalian.

== Political career ==
=== 1812 to 1828 ===
In 1812, Johnson lost a bid to the U.S. Congress. After his defeat, he practiced law in Donaldsonville, Louisiana, located on the south bank of the Mississippi River in the south-central part of the state. He became a district judge of the Ascension Parish Court in 1811; and was selected as a delegate to the first State constitutional convention in 1812.

Upon the death of U.S. senator William C.C. Claiborne in 1818, Johnson was elected by the state legislature as a Democratic-Republican to fill his vacancy. He served as chairman, Senate Committee on Indian Affairs, in the 17th Congress. In 1823, he was elected by the Louisiana State Legislature as an "Adams Republican," also known as the National Republican Party candidate, to a full six-year U.S. Senate term. The Party asked him not to run for governor in 1824, as it wanted to retain control of that Senate seat.

Johnson did run for governor, being elected in 1824. He served a full term as Louisiana Governor from 1824 until 1828. During his term, the legislature moved the state seat of government to Donaldsonville, a compromise location settled on between Anglo-American leaders, who wanted the capital moved from New Orleans to a more northerly location, and French Creoles, who wanted to retain the seat of government within an historically-French area to reflect the state's origins. Earlier in 1824, riots in New Orleans over this same issue had forced the resignation of Governor Thomas B. Robertson.

Johnson gained election as governor due to a bitter division among the Creoles at the time. He also enjoyed the goodwill of a visit to Louisiana by the American Revolutionary War hero, the French aristocrat Marquis de Lafayette. That visit allayed the bitter Creole-Anglo split. Johnson inflamed the conflict again by taking the side of the "Anglos" in a dispute about cotton and sugar cane cultivation.

During Johnson's term, his administration founded two financial institutions that promoted prosperity: the Louisiana State Bank and the Consolidated Association of Planters of Louisiana. He improved commerce within Louisiana by forming the Internal Improvement Board to maintain and build infrastructure – such as roads and canals, to improve transportation and facilitate the movement of goods and produce to market.

=== 1829 to 1842 ===
In 1828, Johnson ran to gain election by the state legislature to his former U.S. Senate seat against Charles Dominique Joseph Bouligny, a man of French and Spanish Creole descent, whose father had been a high-ranking official in Spanish Louisiana at the end of the 18th century. In that election year, Johnson backed Edward Douglass White, Sr., against Edward Livingston for the Louisiana's 1st congressional district, John Quincy Adams for President, and Pierre Derbigny for governor. Some of the men he supported were elected, but the legislature re-elected incumbent Bouligny to the Senate. Bouligny had first been elected after Johnson resigned to take the governorship in 1824. (Adams lost the Presidency to Andrew Jackson.)

In 1834 Johnson was elected as a Whig to the U.S. House of Representatives, to fill the vacancy after the resignation of Edward Douglass White, Sr. He was re-elected for two more terms, serving in total from 1834 to 1839.

In June 1838, while a congressman, Johnson was a party to the 1838 Jesuit slave sale, involving 272 slaves, nearly a third of which were not yet 10 years old. Some of the slaves were sent to Johnson's Chatham Plantation in Ascension Parish, while others ended up on West Oak Plantation (owned by Jesse Batey), in nearby Maringouin, Iberville Parish. Johnson renegotiated the terms of payment in 1844, needing more time to pay off his debt. That same year, Johnson sold a share of Chatham and would eventually sell the remainder of his land and enslaved people to John R. Thompson in 1851.

Henry Johnson unsuccessfully ran for governor in 1842 as the Whig nominee. He was defeated by Democratic nominee U. S. Senator Alexandre Mouton.

=== 1844 to 1850 ===
In 1844, Johnson was elected to fill the vacant U.S. Senate position of Alexander Porter, who never took the seat due to ill health and died in January 1844. Johnson served the remainder of the term until 1849. He served as Chairman of the Committee on Pensions. As senator he supported bills favoring the annexation of Texas, which had become an independent Republic after separating from Mexico. He also voted to repeal the tariff of 1846.

In 1848 Johnson lost a bid to remain in the Senate to Pierre Soulé, a Jacksonian-Democrat of French Creole descent. In 1850, he suffered a final political defeat, losing a race for U.S. Representative against Henry Adams Bullard (Whig).

Henry Johnson moved to New Roads in Pointe Coupée Parish and continued the practice of law.

== Personal life ==
After passing the bar, Johnson married Elizabeth Rousby Key, a daughter of Philip Barton Key by Ann Plater, a daughter of George Plater; Elizabeth's father was an uncle of Francis Scott Key and Anne Arnold Phoebe Charlton Key, who married Roger B. Taney. The couple had a family together.

Several years after the United States made the Louisiana Purchase, the Johnsons moved to the Territory of Orleans, in 1809. He was appointed as clerk of the Second Superior Court of the Territory. In 1811, he was appointed clerk of the newly formed St. Mary Parish in the southwestern part of the state.

=== Death ===
Johnson returned to Pointe Coupee Parish in 1850, where he retired after his final political defeat. He died in September 1864, near the close of the Civil War, and was buried on his plantation, which lies at the junction of Bayou Grosse Tête and Bayou Maringouin.

Sidney A. Marchand in his Story of Ascension Parish said that Johnson had bequeathed the land in Donaldsonville on which was built the present-day Ascension Episcopal Church (at the corner of Attakapas/Nicholls and St. Patrick streets).

Party political offices
Preceded by Andre B. Roman	Whig nominee for Governor of Louisiana; 1842	Succeeded by Guillaume Louis DeBuys
U.S. Senate
Preceded by William C.C. Claiborne	U.S. senator (Class 2) from Louisiana; January 12, 1818 – May 27, 1824; Served alongside: Eligius Fromentin, James Brown, Josiah S. Johnston	Succeeded by Dominique Bouligny
Preceded by Alexander Porter	U.S. senator (Class 3) from Louisiana; February 12, 1844 – March 3, 1849; Served alongside: Alexander Barrow, Pierre Soulé, Solomon W. Downs	Succeeded by Pierre Soulé
Political offices
Preceded by Henry S. Thibodaux	Governor of Louisiana; 1824–1828	Succeeded by Pierre Derbigny
U.S. House of Representatives
Preceded by Edward Douglass White Sr.	Member of the U.S. House of Representatives from Louisiana's 1st congressional district December 1, 1834 – March 3, 1839	Succeeded by Edward Douglass White Sr.
Honorary titles
Preceded by John J. Crittenden	Most senior living U.S. senator (Sitting or former); July 26, 1863 – September 4, 1864	Succeeded by Walter Lowrie
