= Jesse Batey =

Louisiana plantation owner

Jesse Batey, alternately Jesse Beatty, was an American planter and one of the primary beneficiaries of the 1838 Jesuit slave sale, in which the Maryland Province of the Society of Jesus agreed to sell 272 slaves to Batey and Henry Johnson.

== Biography ==
Batey owned a 2800-acre plantation in Maringouin, Iberville Parish, Louisiana, along with additional landholdings in Pointe Coupée and Fordoche. At the time of the 1838 sale, he was a resident of Terrebonne Parish.

Three weeks prior to the 1838 slave sale, Batey traveled north to Washington, D.C. in order to list the Maringouin plantation for sale in The Washington Globe, seeking either payment in slaves or a business partnership with another slaveowner. On June 19, 1838, the Maryland Province of the Society of Jesus agreed to sell 272 slaves to Batey and Henry Johnson. Mulledy finalized the sale of 64 slaves to Batey on November 10 of the same year. The enslaved persons ranged in age from 65 years to 18 months, with over half being children under the age of 18.

Following Batey's death in 1852, the majority of the slaves sold in the agreement were purchased along with Batey's estate by John S. Barrow. The plantation was ultimately renamed West Oak and fell into the possession of Emily Woolfolk, the widow of notorious slave trader Austin Woolfolk, in 1856. Many of the enslaved persons working on the plantation at the time of emancipation in 1865 were either sold in 1838 or were descendants of those slaves.
