= Maryland State Library =

Official State Library of Maryland

Coordinates: 39.28924°N 76.61507°W

Agency overview
- Formed: 1935
- Preceding agency: Division of Library Development and Services (DLDS)
- Jurisdiction: State of Maryland
- Headquarters: 25 South Charles St., Suite 1310; Baltimore, MD, 21201
- Employees: 31
- Annual budget: $87,385,214 FY 2020
- Agency executives: Morgan L. Miller, State Librarian; Renee Croft, Library Facilities Program Manager
- Website: https://msla.maryland.gov/

The Maryland State Library Agency is the official state library agency of Maryland located in Baltimore, Maryland. It is governed by the twelve-member Maryland State Library Board.

They administer state and federal funds supporting Maryland's twenty-four public library systems. The organization oversees the Maryland State Library for the Blind and Print Disabled, the state's public libraries, the State Library Network (including the Maryland State Library Resource Center), the Library Capital Grants Programs, and the Deaf Culture Digital Library.

== History ==
The State Library originally existed as the Office of Public Libraries under the State Board of Education starting in 1935, though the State Library Commission which oversaw public libraries was established in Maryland by statute in 1902. MSL became an independent agency within the State of Maryland, merging the Department of Education's Division of Library Development & Services, with their Public Libraries & State Networking Branch in 2017.

== See also ==
- List of libraries in the United States
