= Craig Steven Wilder =

American historian

- Occupations: Historian; professor

Academic background
- Education: Columbia University

Craig Steven Wilder is an American academic historian, professor of American history at Massachusetts Institute of Technology.

== Biography ==
He grew up in Bedford-Stuyvesant in Brooklyn, New York. He received his Ph.D. from Columbia University focusing on urban history, under the tutelage of Kenneth T. Jackson, as well as Barbara J. Fields and Eric Foner. His doctoral dissertation was titled Race and the History of Brooklyn, New York which followed the history of Brooklyn from the arrival of the Dutch to the present day, focusing on the experiences of African-Americans. He has appeared on the History Channel's F.D.R.: A Presidency Revealed and on Ric Burns' PBS series, New York: A Documentary Film. Wilder was an assistant professor and Chair of African-American Studies at Williams College from 1995 to 2002, when he joined the faculty at Dartmouth. He remained at Dartmouth from 2002 to 2008 when he joined the faculty at MIT.

He is the author of A Covenant with Color: Race and Social Power in Brooklyn (2000), In The Company of Black Men: The African Influence on African American Culture in New York City (2001) and Ebony & Ivy: Race, Slavery, and the Troubled History of America's Universities (2013), called a "pathbreaking overview" of slavery's entwining with higher education in colonial America and the Early Republic. He was awarded The University Medal of Excellence by Columbia University in 2004.
