= Jesuit Conference of Canada and the United States =

Catholic collaborative organization

- Abbreviation: JCCU
- Established: 2014; 12 years ago
- Purpose: Jesuit collaboration
- Headquarters: Washington, D.C.
- Region served: North America
- Members: Jesuit Provinces: Canada; USA East; USA Central & Southern; USA Midwest; USA West
- Association: Canada & U.S. Jesuit Provinces
- President: Brian G. Paulson, S.J.
- Parent organization: Society of Jesus
- Staff: Eight
- Website: www.jesuits.org

Jesuit Conference of Canada and the United States is the collaborating body of the five provincial superiors of the Society of Jesus in Canada, the United States, Belize, and Haiti. The conference includes the Canada Province (which includes Haiti) and the four provinces of the United States: USA East, USA Central and Southern (which includes Belize), USA Midwest, and USA West.

The conference is led by a president, who also serves as chair of the Conference board. The administrative offices are in Washington, D.C., with eight on the full-time staff. The conference hosts the provincial websites.

== History ==
From 2014 to 2017, the Jesuit provinces in the United States were consolidated. Some had divided in the 1950s when they reached maximum size, to become California, Chicago-Detroit, Maryland, Missouri, New England, New Orleans, New York, Oregon, and Wisconsin, known collectively as the US Assistancy. In the new grouping, New England and New York have formed USA Northeast Province, which was renamed USA East Province when Maryland later joined the grouping; Missouri and New Orleans became USA Central and Southern Province; Chicago-Detroit and Wisconsin have joined to become Midwest Province; and Oregon and California became USA West Province. There was some adjustment of boundary lines. The Jesuits have more ministries in the United States than they did at the peak of their membership, largely because of lay partnerships and diversification of ministries.

== Services ==
The Conference website is a source of information about the Jesuits and their beliefs.

=== Social justice ===
Since its 32nd General Congregation in 1972, the Society of Jesus has made the promotion of justice a central part of all of its works. The Conference facilitates cooperation toward this end among the various Jesuit works, and among those in any way connected to the Jesuits.

The Jesuits’ Office of Justice and Ecology at the Conference engages with "legislators, public officials, corporations and the Jesuit network on issues including immigration and economic, criminal, juvenile and environmental justice." It also carries worldwide news on ecological initiatives, especially Jesuit initiatives.

The Jesuit Refugee Service, active in over 50 countries, through its local branch overseen by the Conference ministers principally to the spiritual needs of detained refugees and immigrants. An outgrowth of this has been the Kino Border Initiative for which the Jesuit provincials have shown concerted support.

The Press Center disseminates news of organizations like the Ignatian Solidarity Network and its annual Ignatian Family Teach-in. It also carries on its own news and advocacy efforts on its website.

== See also ==
- Jesuits in the United States
- Jesuit Schools Network
