= John W. Beschter =

Luxembourgish Jesuit missionary

The Reverend John W. Beschter SJ
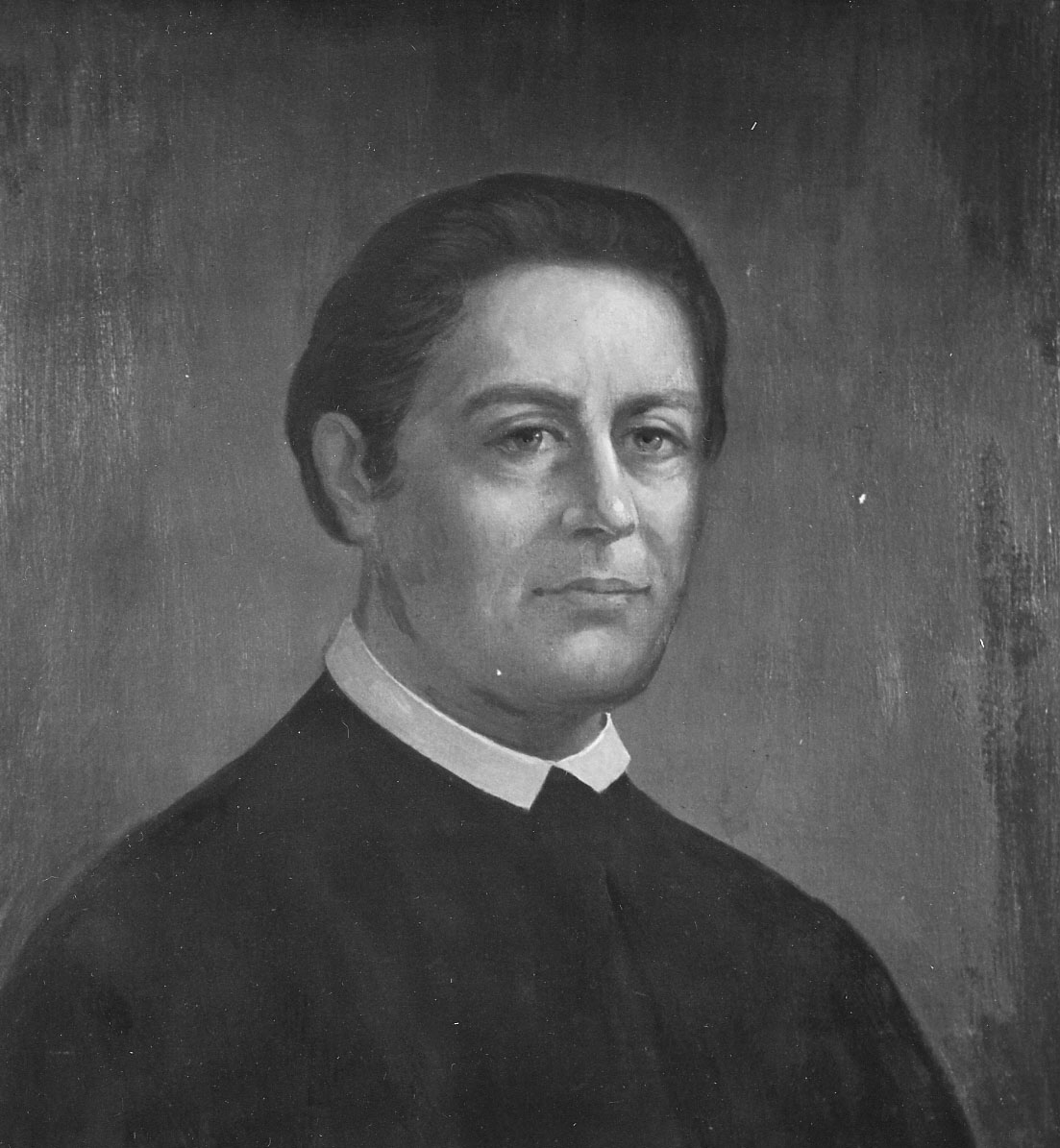

16th President of Georgetown College
- In office March 31, 1829 – September 14, 1829
- Preceded by: William Feiner
- Succeeded by: Thomas F. Mulledy

Personal details
- Born: Johann Wilhelm Beschter; May 20, 1763 Duchy of Luxembourg, Austrian Netherlands
- Died: January 6, 1842 (aged 78) Paradise, Pennsylvania, U.S.
- Resting place: Conewago Chapel

John William Beschter SJ (born Johann Wilhelm Beschter; German: [ˈjoːhan ˈvɪlhɛlm ˈbɛʃtɐ]; May 20, 1763 – January 6, 1842) was a Catholic priest and Jesuit from the Duchy of Luxembourg in the Austrian Netherlands. He emigrated to the United States as a missionary in 1807, where he ministered in rural Pennsylvania and Maryland. Beschter was the last Jesuit pastor of St. Mary's Church in Lancaster, as well as the pastor of St. John the Evangelist Church in Baltimore, Maryland. He was also a priest at several other German-speaking churches in Pennsylvania.

Beschter's ministerial work was punctuated by a time as master of novices at the new Jesuit novitiate at White Marsh Manor, as well as a brief term as president of Georgetown College in 1829. While in Maryland, he aligned himself with the Continental European Jesuits in the United States, who endorsed a monarchist view of ecclesiastical leadership. After his presidency, Beschter remained at Georgetown for a year as a professor of German, before returning to Paradise, Pennsylvania, where he lived out the last twelve years of his life as a priest.

== Early life ==
Johann Wilhelm Beschter was born on May 20, 1763, in the Duchy of Luxembourg, (Note: Some sources indicate that Beschter may have been born in the Duchy of Limbourg.) located in the Austrian Netherlands, a part of the Holy Roman Empire. While little is known about his early life, Archbishop John Carroll reported that, before sailing for the New World from Amsterdam in 1807, Beschter was a pastor and dean in Luxembourg.

After arriving in the United States, he was admitted to the Society of Jesus on October 10, 1807, and anglicized his name as John William Beschter. On August 22, 1809, and again on April 21, 1814, he submitted petitions for naturalization while in Lancaster County, Pennsylvania.

== Missionary in the United States ==
=== Pennsylvania ===
In the year of his arrival in the United States, Beschter was assigned as a priest to St. Mary's Church in Lancaster, Pennsylvania. By the following year, he had been made pastor of the church, making him the only Jesuit pastor of St. Mary's following the restoration of the Society in America. Though assigned to St. Mary's, he drew the praise of Archbishop Carroll for simultaneously ministering to three congregations in the area, which comprised American, German, and Irish parishioners. His appointment as pastor quieted an existing quarrel within the parish over the nationality and language of the pastor. Beschter's predecessor, Herman J. Stoecker, was not proficient in English, to the consternation of the Irish congregants. Stoecker had succeeded Francis Fitzsimons, an Irishman who could not speak German, which ruffled the German majority of parishioners. Beschter's proficiency in English as well as his native German made him a satisfactory solution to the dispute.

During his pastorate, the church established a mission to Lebanon, Pennsylvania, in 1810, as it had done in other locations throughout the state in the past. Beschter celebrated the laying of the cornerstone of the mission church, named St. Mary of the Assumption, on July 23 of that year. Presiding over the ceremony, he preached in both English and German to a congregation of Catholics and Protestants, which included one Moravian, three Lutheran and three Reformed pastors. Beschter was described as having garnered the support and attachment of the congregation as pastor. Upon the end of his pastorate in 1812, he was replaced by another Irishman, Michael J. Byrne. Though successful as a pastor and a "very holy man", Carroll found Beschter in "want of a better education in the Society", as with many of the other foreign Jesuit missionaries in America.

=== Maryland ===
Beschter then became involved in the establishment of the Jesuit novitiate at White Marsh Manor in Prince George's County, Maryland. Though the Jesuits had an established presence in White Marsh dating to around 1741, it was not until 1814 that serious efforts to establish a new novitiate there were undertaken. Beschter escorted the first group of novices from Frederick, Maryland to the novitiate at White Marsh, where they arrived on July 12, 1814. For some time during that year, he acted as master of novices at White Marsh.

He is next noted as having been an assistant curate to Louis de Barth in Conewago Township, Adams County, Pennsylvania, in 1816. As the Catholic community surrounding Conewago grew, the initially dependent mission churches were granted greater degrees of autonomy, though still retaining an association with Conewago. Beschter was placed in charge of one of these – Brandt Chapel – in the Pigeon Hills area of Paradise in York County. Later that year, he was stationed in Frederick, where he remained for two years. By 1818, Beschter had fallen ill and became involved in disagreements with Bishop Michael Egan of Philadelphia, and so left for Georgetown in Washington, D.C. To mark the tercentenary of Martin Luther's writing of the Ninety-five Theses, a pamphlet was published in Philadelphia under Beschter's name titled "The Blessed Reformation – Martin Luther portrayed by himself". In reality, the pamphlet was written by Anthony Kohlmann, who used Beschter's name as a pseudonym.

In 1820, Beschter was appointed pastor of St. John the Evangelist Church in Baltimore, Maryland, on the site of the present St. Alphonsus Church. Succeeding F. X. Brosius, he led the mostly German congregation until 1828, when he was succeeded by Louis De Barth. Beschter became involved in the tensions stemming from American Jesuits' skepticism of their Continental European counterparts being put in charge of American institutions. He defended the Jesuit Superior General, Luigi Fortis' appointment of Polish-born Francis Dzierozynski in 1820 as socius, (Note: A socius was an important assistant to the provincial superior.) consultor, and admonitor to Charles Neale (the mission superior for the United States), which vested Dzierozynski with broad authority. He condemned the "curious" American view that "sovereignty rests essentially in the people", as well as their opposition to monarchy. On February 2, 1821, the status of gradus in the Society of Jesus was conferred on Beschter. (Note: Gradus was an academic rank conferred on members of the Society of Jesus.) When Dzierozynski was later made mission superior in 1823, Beschter again supported him.

== Georgetown College ==
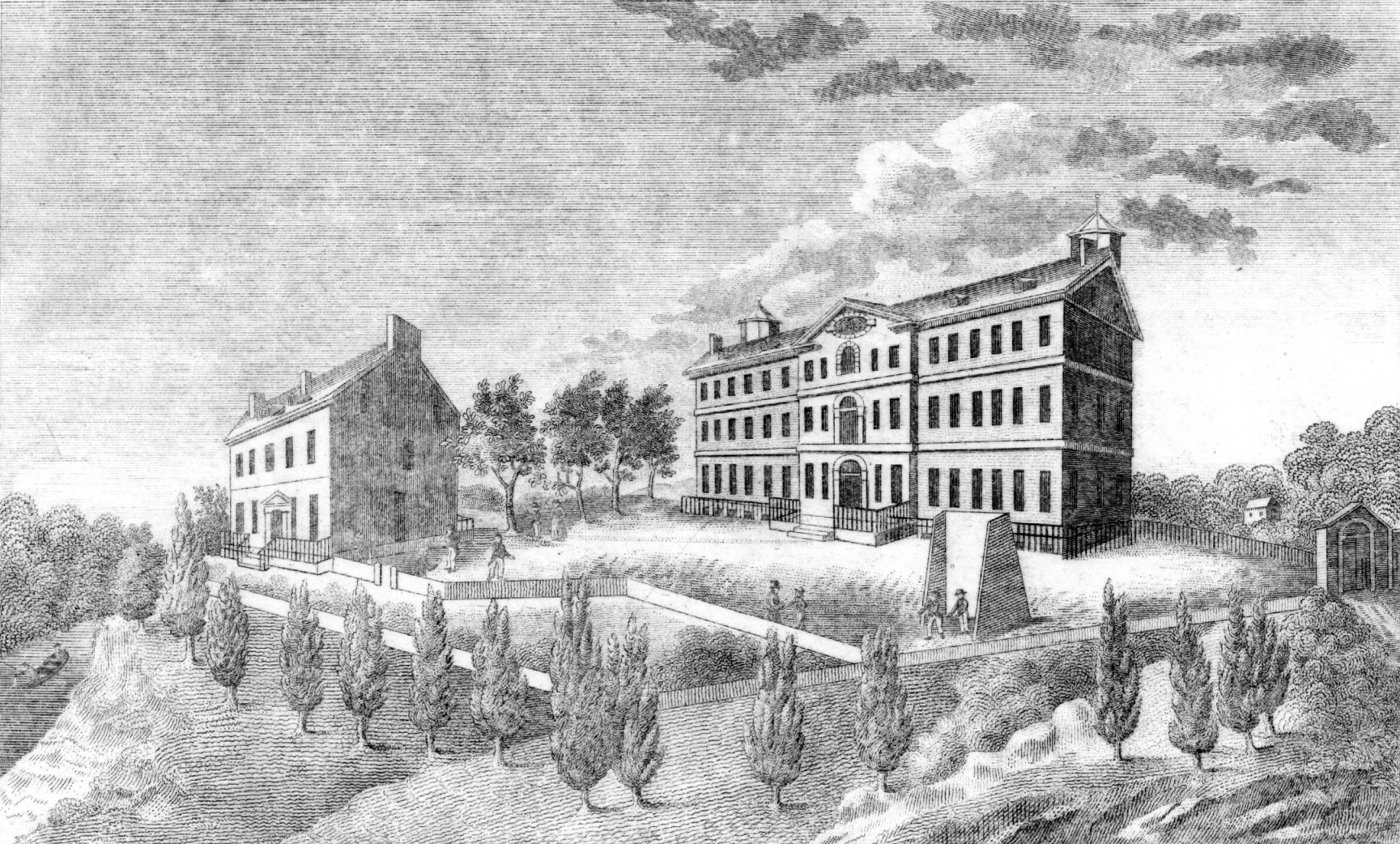
Georgetown's campus in 1829

In 1828, Beschter was transferred to Georgetown College as minister. When William Feiner was permitted to resign the presidency in 1829 (he had contracted tuberculosis, to which he would succumb by June), Beschter was appointed president of Georgetown College, assuming office on March 31 of that year. His selection came as a surprise and was met with opposition by the Anglo-American laymen, who claimed Beschter was not fluent in speaking or writing in English, despite the fact that he was competent enough to preach in English. They further asserted that he had no knowledge of the operation of a college. Likewise, nativist Jesuits opposed the leadership of Georgetown by such foreigners as Anthony Kohlmann, Stephen Dubuisson, and Beschter.

The school fared well during his presidency, compared to the several preceding years, and counted 45 enrolled students. That year, Georgetown opened St. John's Literary Institution as an offshoot in Frederick, which was placed under the charge of John McElroy, and whose cornerstone had been laid on August 7 of the previous year. While at Georgetown, Beschter became a friend of Susan Decatur, a convert to Catholicism and the widow of Stephen Decatur. Following the end of his presidency, he was succeeded by Thomas F. Mulledy on September 14, 1829. Beschter remained at Georgetown in 1830 as a professor of German.

== Later years ==
After retiring from Georgetown in 1830, Beschter returned to the Brandt Chapel at Paradise, Pennsylvania, which continued to be a mission of Conewago. He lived out the remainder of his life in Paradise. In his last year, Beschter was assisted by Phillip Sacchi, who lived with him in Paradise. Beschter died there on January 6, 1842, and his body was taken to the Conewago Chapel to be interred.

== Notes ==
Catholic Church titles
Preceded by Herman J. Stoecker	Pastor of St. Mary's Church; 1807–1812	Succeeded by Michael J. Byrne
Preceded by F. X. Brosius	Pastor of St. John the Evangelist Church; 1820–1828	Succeeded by Louis de Barth
Academic offices
Preceded by William Feiner	16th President of Georgetown College; 1829	Succeeded by Thomas F. Mulledy
