= William Feiner =

German Jesuit missionary

The Reverend William Feiner SJ
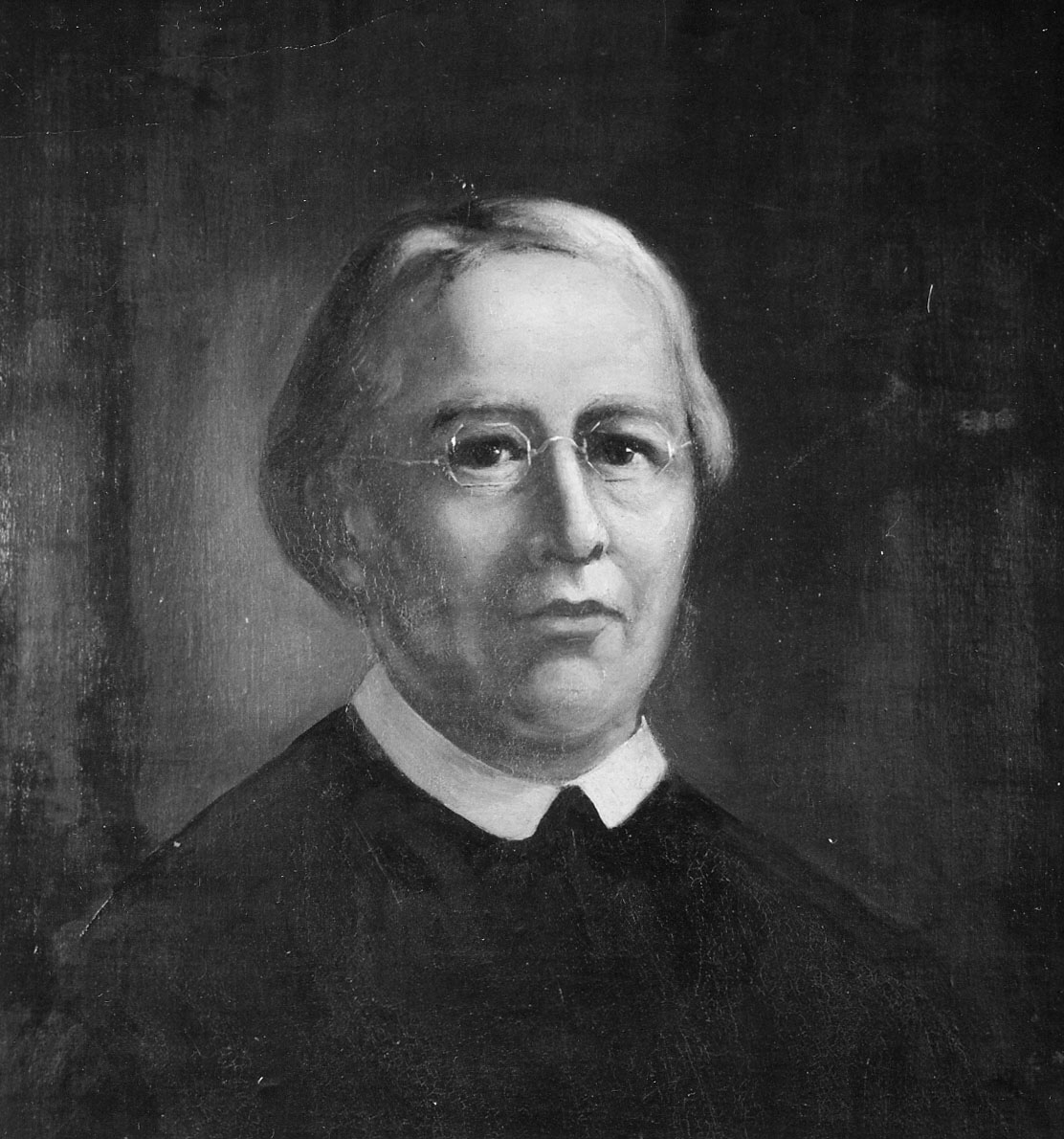

15th President of Georgetown College
- In office 1826–1829
- Preceded by: Stephen L. Dubuisson
- Succeeded by: John W. Beschter

Personal details
- Born: Wilhelm Feiner; December 27, 1792 Münster, Prince-Bishopric of Münster, Holy Roman Empire
- Died: June 9, 1829 (aged 36) Georgetown, District of Columbia, U.S. (Note: Georgetown was a separately chartered city within the District of Columbia until the consolidation of the district's governments into a single entity, Washington, D.C., with the Organic Act of 1871.)

William Feiner SJ (born Wilhelm Feiner; December 27, 1792 – June 9, 1829) was a German Catholic priest and Jesuit who became a missionary to the United States and eventually the president of Georgetown College, now known as Georgetown University.

Born in Münster, he taught in Jesuit schools in the Russian Empire and Polish Galicia as a young member of the Society of Jesus. He then emigrated to the United States several years after the restoration of the Society, taking up pastoral work and teaching theology in Conewago, Pennsylvania, before becoming a full-time professor at Georgetown College. There, he also became the second dedicated librarian of Georgetown's library. Eventually, Feiner became president of the college in 1826. While president, he taught theology at Georgetown and ministered to the congregation at Holy Trinity Church.

Despite being the leader of an American university, he never mastered the English language. Long plagued by poor health due to tuberculosis, his short-lived presidency ended after three years, just weeks before his death.

== Early life ==
Wilhelm Feiner was born on December 27, 1792, in the city of Münster in the Prince-Bishopric of Münster (in modern-day Germany). He entered the Society of Jesus on July 12, 1808, in White Russia (i.e. Belarus), officially becoming a member on August 7 of that year. Before emigrating to the United States, he taught in Jesuit schools in Polish Galicia and the Russian Empire, where the Jesuits were permitted to operate despite being suppressed by the pope and expelled from Western Europe. For this reason, he was sometimes erroneously identified as being Polish rather than German.

=== American missionary ===
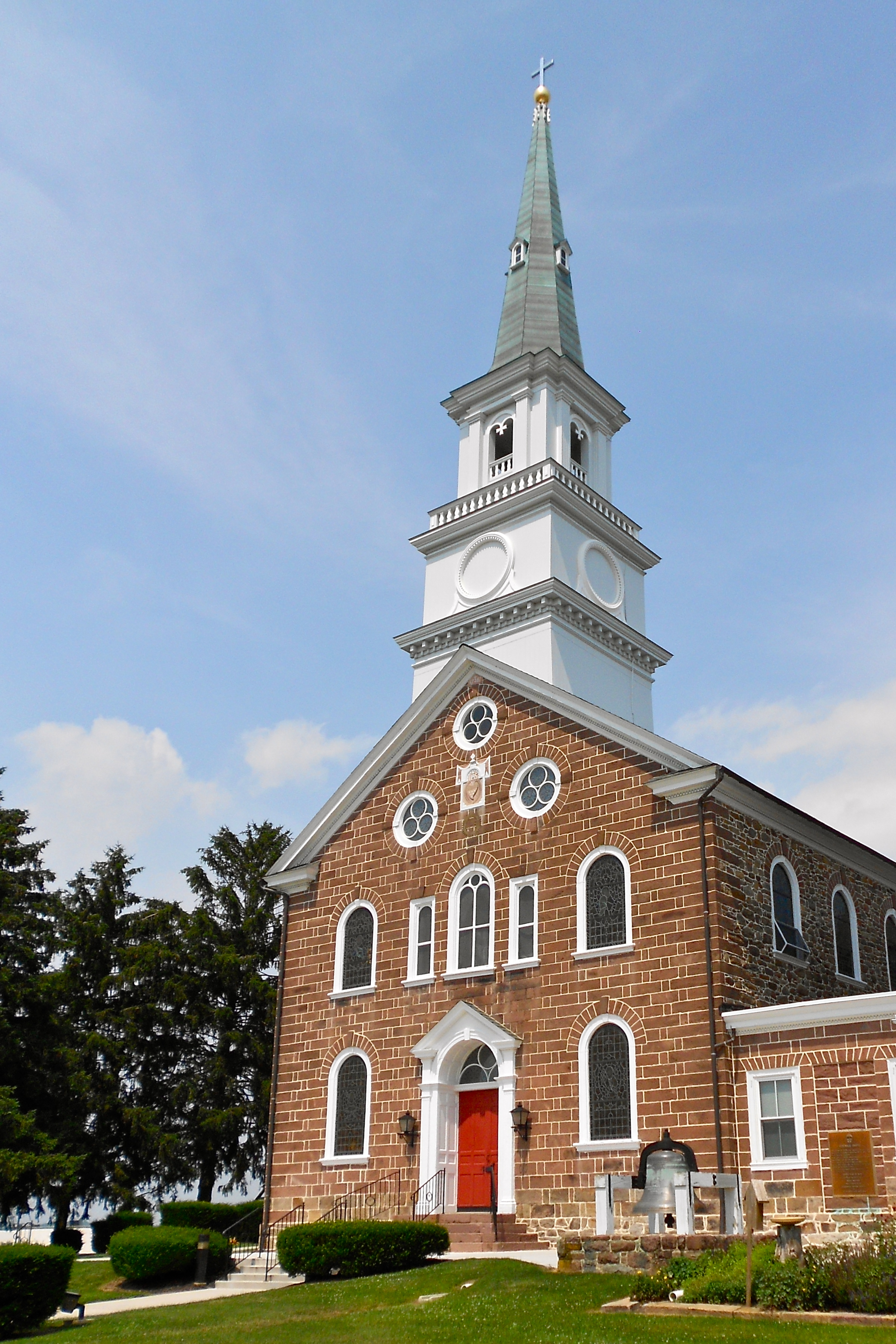
Conewago Chapel

Feiner was sent to the United States in 1822 to assist the American Jesuits in re-establishing their work following the worldwide restoration of the Society of Jesus in 1814. After his move, he anglicized his name to William Feiner. From 1823 to 1826, he was assigned as an assistant to Matthew Lekue at the Conewago Chapel in the town of Conewago, Adams County, Pennsylvania, where there was a large German-speaking population. In addition to his pastoral work, Feiner taught theology in Conewago in 1824. Peter Kenney, the Jesuit visitor to the United States, returned to Europe and appointed Feiner to the position in his stead; by this time Feiner was already in very poor health, suffering from tuberculosis.

Feiner was prefect of studies at Georgetown College in the District of Columbia from 1825 to 1826, during which time he also served as a professor of theology and German. James A. Neill took over as prefect at the end of his term. In 1825, Feiner became the second official librarian of the Georgetown College Library when Thomas C. Levins, who had filled the position since 1824, was dismissed from the Society of Jesus and left for New York City. When Feiner relinquished the office in 1826, James Van de Velde succeeded him.

== President of Georgetown College ==
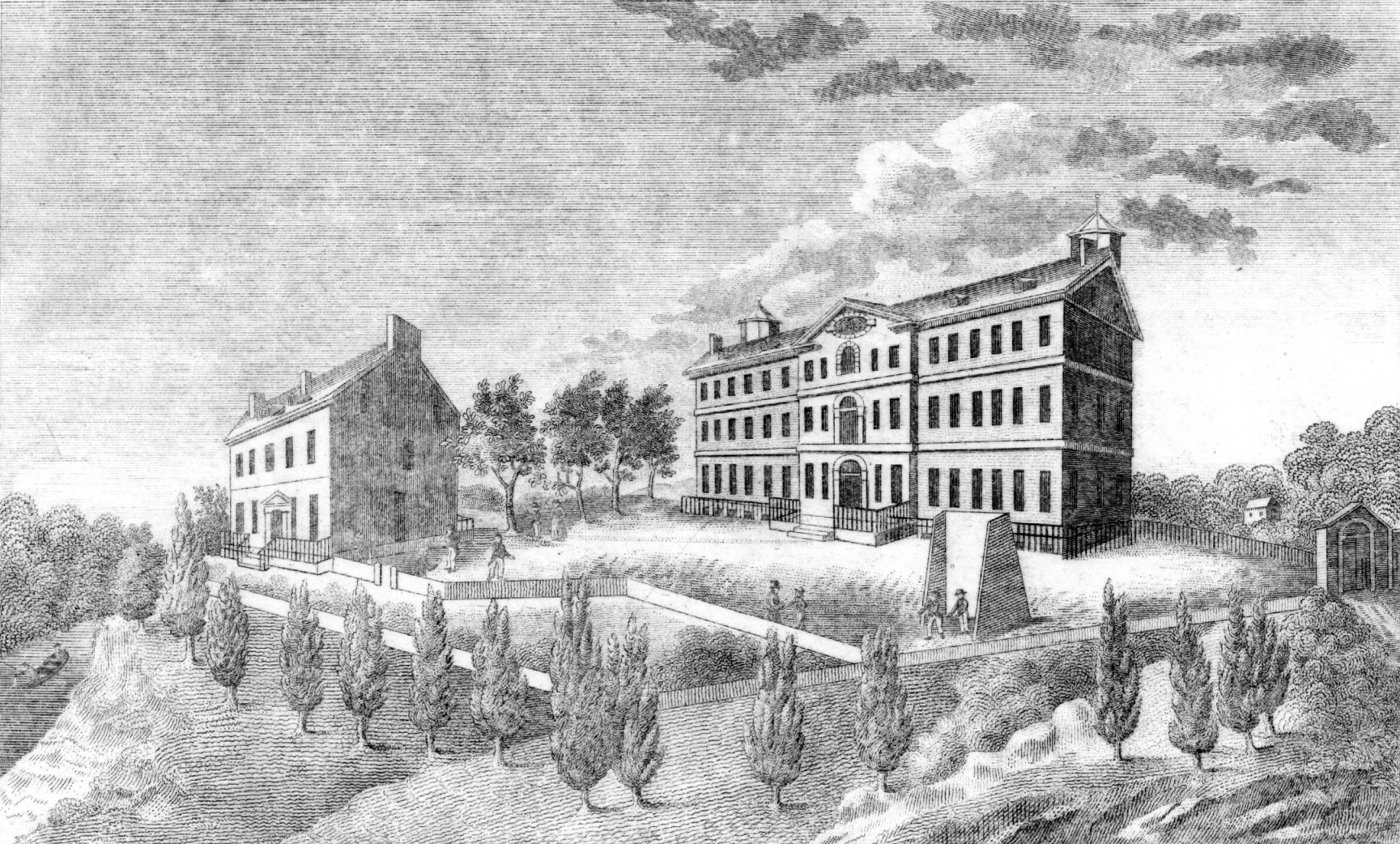
Georgetown College campus in 1829

When the president of Georgetown College, Stephen Larigaudelle Dubuisson, was permitted to resign the office, he eagerly sailed to Europe, specifically France. Feiner was appointed president on May 4, 1826, by the Jesuit provincial superior, Francis Dzierozynski. He assumed the office on July 8, 1826, despite suffering from advanced tuberculosis and being unable to speak even basic English; indeed, he never mastered the English language. When he learned of the provincial's order, he is said to have entered Dubuisson's room sobbing and declaring that he was neither competent to hold the office nor desirous of it. While president, Feiner ministered to the congregation at Holy Trinity Church in Georgetown. He also worked as a professor of moral theology in 1828 and of dogmatic theology in 1829.

Given Feiner's failing health, John W. Beschter left Baltimore for the college, anticipating that he would have to succeed Feiner as president. Two historians of the university, John Gilmary Shea and Robert Emmett Curran, judged Feiner's administration, like others of the decade, to be lackluster. He resigned on March 30, 1829, and died at Georgetown College on June 9 of that year.

== Notes ==
Academic offices
Preceded by Stephen Larigaudelle Dubuisson	15th President of Georgetown College; 1826–1829	Succeeded by John W. Beschter
