= Dubuisson =

Dubuisson may refer to:

- Dubuisson (surname)
- Dubuisson, Quebec or Val-d'Or, a city in Quebec, Canada
- Dubuisson Brewery (Brasserie Dubuisson Frères) is a Belgian family brewery in Pipaix, province of Hainaut
