= Bush (beer) =

Belgian beer brand

Bush is a Belgian beer. There are a few types of Bush but the most famous is the high-fermentation amber beer with a strong taste of malt. Also known as Bush 16, its official name is now Amber Bush. It is the flagship product of the Dubuisson Brewery, situated in Pipaix in the municipality of Leuze-en-Hainaut, Belgium. Bush has an alcohol level that reaches 16% and makes Amber Bush one of the strongest beers. Its label claims that it is "The strongest Belgian beer".

== History of Bush ==
In 1933, one year after Alfred and Amédée inherited their parents' brewery, they decided to compete with the English who occupied a good position on the market of strong beers, with an alcohol content ranging from 6 or 7 to 8%. That is how the brothers created the Bush beer, with its 12% alcohol content. To compete with the English, he gave an English name to his beer and translated it into English. Dubuisson bière would be translated into English as Bush beer. However, in the United States, the beer is sold under the name "Scaldis" (the Latin name of the river Scheldt).

In 1998, the name Bush beer changed to become the Amber Bush, which is the characteristic colour of this beer.

The brewery is totally independent; Hugues Dubuisson takes decisions alone.

In terms of raw materials, the brewery is semi-independent, since the brewery has its own laboratory yeast culture and uses water drawn from its sub-soil. The brewery has its own well, the water used is drawn between 37 and 45 metres deep, very pure water, essential for a good beer. The raw materials must be purchased. The hops and barley come from the Czech Republic.

== The Bush range ==
- Amber Bush: created in 1933 under the name of Bush Beer, it is one of the oldest "special" Belgian beers and the most popular among Bush beers. It contains alcohol and it is sold in 33 cl bottles. Bottles of 75cl, are known as Tripel Amber Bush.
- Bush Blonde with 10.5% alcohol content is sold in 33 cl bottles. Bottles of 75cl are called Bush Blonde Triple.
- Christmas Bush is a 12 degree beer and it is sold in bottles of 33 cl. Bottles of 75cl, are known under the name of Christmas Premium Bush with 13% of alcohol.
- Night Bush contains 13% of alcohol. This is a Christmas Bush that has matured between 6 and 9 months in wooden casks having contained Burgundy from Nuits-Saint-Georges.
- Luxury Bush contains 13% of alcohol. This is an Amber Bush that has matured in oak barrels for a period of 6 months. It is only sold in bottles of 75 cl.

Pêche Mel' Bush with its 8.5% alcohol volume is actually made up of half Timmermans lambic beer(4% alcohol) and half Amber Bush.

Production of the Bush 7 (7.5% alcohol) was recently discontinued.

Cuvée des Trolls has an alcohol content of 7% and it is the only beer of the Dubuisson brewery not to be called Bush. However, although this beer is a product of the Dubuisson brewery, two microbreweries are devoted to it. One situated in Mons and another one in the student city of Louvain-la-Neuve. It is sold in bottles of 33 cl. Bottles of 75cl are known as Tripel Cuvée des Trolls.

In 1996, the brewery exported its products to France, Switzerland, Spain, the Netherlands, Italy, the UK, Canada, Japan and the United States. Today, the brewery also exports to Taiwan, Hungary, Brazil and South Africa.
