= Robert Plunkett =

English Jesuit missionary

The Reverend Robert Plunkett SJ
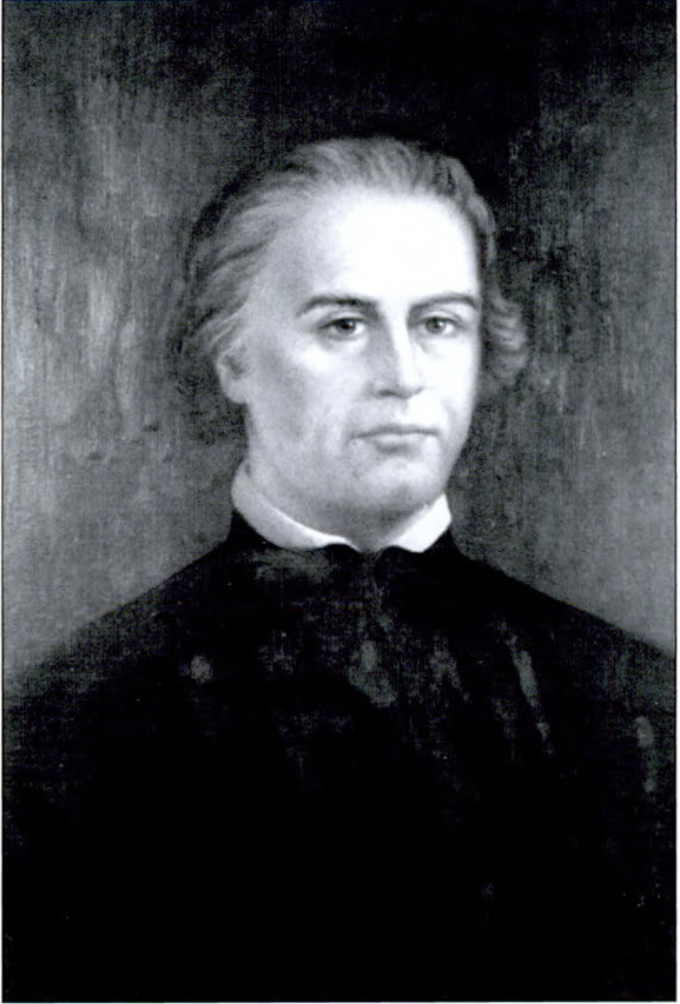

1st President of Georgetown College
- In office 1791–1793
- Succeeded by: Robert Molyneux

Personal details
- Born: 1752 England
- Died: January 15, 1815 (aged 62–63) Chaptico, Maryland, United States
- Resting place: Georgetown Visitation Monastery
- Education: Colleges of St Omer and Bruges; English College, Douai

Robert Plunkett (1752 – January 15, 1815) was an English Catholic priest and missionary to the United States who became the first president of Georgetown College. Born in England, he was educated at the Colleges of St Omer and Bruges, as well as at the English College at Douai. There, he entered the Society of Jesus in 1769, but left four years later, just before learning of the papal order suppressing the Society. Therefore, he was ordained a secular priest at the English College, and became the chaplain to a monastery of English Benedictine nuns in exile in Brussels.

Plunkett petitioned to be sent to the United States as a missionary in 1789. Shortly after his arrival in 1790, Bishop John Carroll persuaded him to become the president of the newly established Georgetown College. Plunkett oversaw construction of the college's first building, the appointment of the first professor, and admission of the first student, William Gaston. However, he was more interested in pastoral work than education, and resigned the office two years later. Plunkett spent the remainder of his life ministering in rural Maryland, though continued to remain involved in the college's affairs.

== Early life ==
Robert Plunkett was born in 1752, in England. He was educated at the Colleges of St Omer and Bruges from 1763 to 1768, before attending the English College at Douai. He entered the Society of Jesus in 1769, but left the order on August 21, 1773, after the promulgation of a papal brief suppressing the Jesuits worldwide, but before news of this brief reached him in the Low Countries. He continued his studies at Douai as a secular seminarian, and was ordained a priest there. After his ordination, Plunkett became the chaplain to the Monastery of Our Lady of the Assumption in Brussels, in the Austrian Netherlands, which housed a community of Benedictine nuns who had been exiled from England.

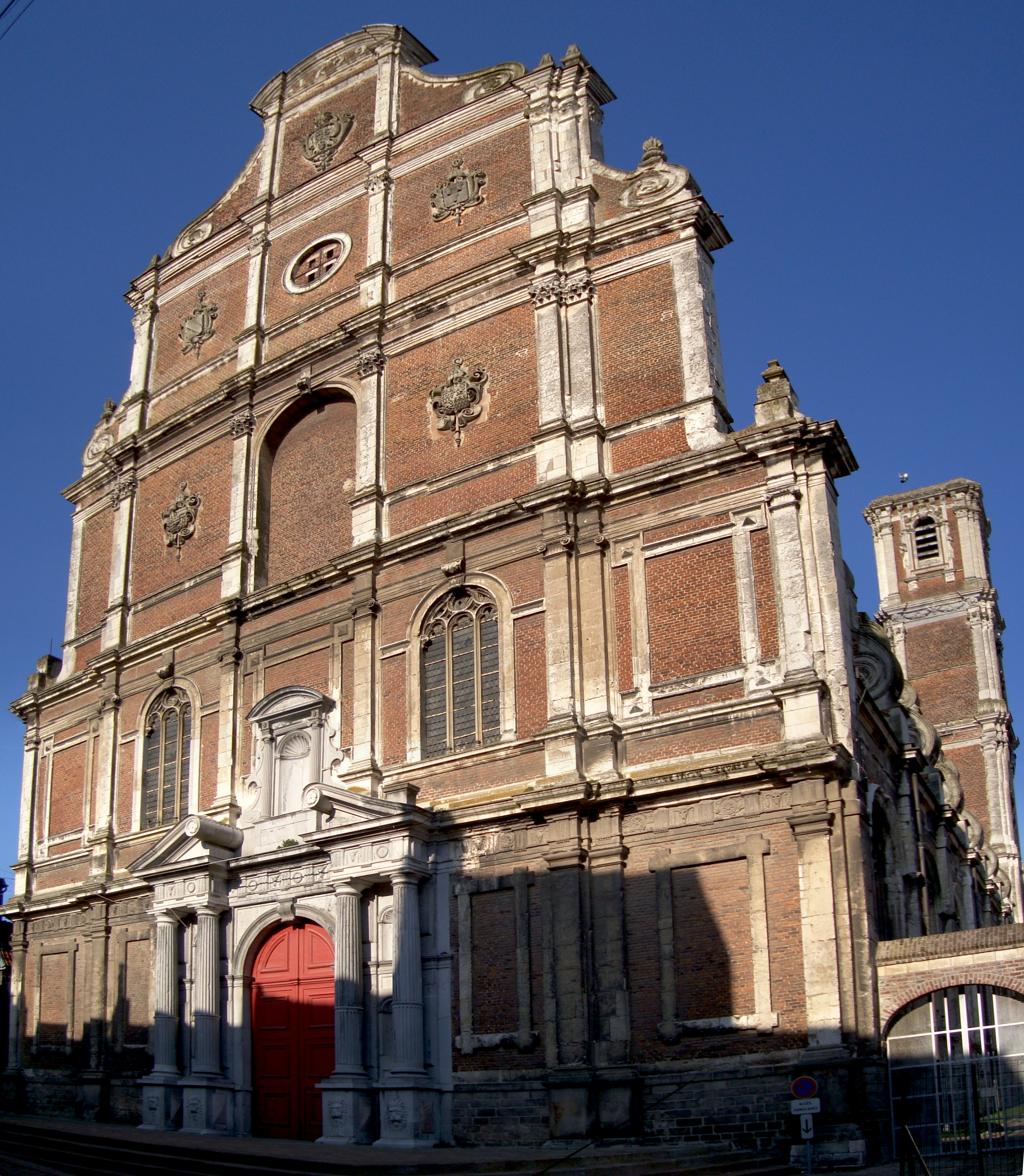
Chapel of the Jesuit college in Saint-Omer

On April 20, 1789, Plunkett requested permission from his bishop, the Vicar Apostolic of the London District, to go to the United States as a missionary. Because the American Church was at this point governed as a mission territory under Propaganda Fide, the request needed approval from Rome. The prefect of the congregation, Cardinal Leonardo Antonelli, approved the request and informed John Carroll, the Prefect Apostolic of the United States, who had been recruiting priests in Europe—especially former Jesuits, parish priests, and Sulpicians—to run the newly established Georgetown College in Maryland.

On May 1, 1790, Plunkett set sail for America from Texel, aboard a ship called The Brothers, along with Charles Neale and a group of four Discalced Carmelite sisters from Hoogstraten who were going to found a convent in the United States. The journey was prolonged because the captain had taken aboard goods to be delivered to Santa Cruz de Tenerife in the Canary Islands. Plunkett frequently went ashore while the ship was in port in Santa Cruz. He laid to rest the concerns of the local ecclesiastical authorities, who learned of a rumor that the Carmelite sisters were nuns fleeing their monastery with the aid of the two priests. (Note: The Spanish Inquisition was still ongoing at this time, and the Canary Islands were possessions of the Spanish Empire.) The vessel arrived in New York City on July 2, 1790. Plunkett then departed Neale and the Carmelites and continued his journey to Maryland by land. His first assignment was at the Jesuit plantation of White Marsh in Prince George's County.

== Georgetown College ==
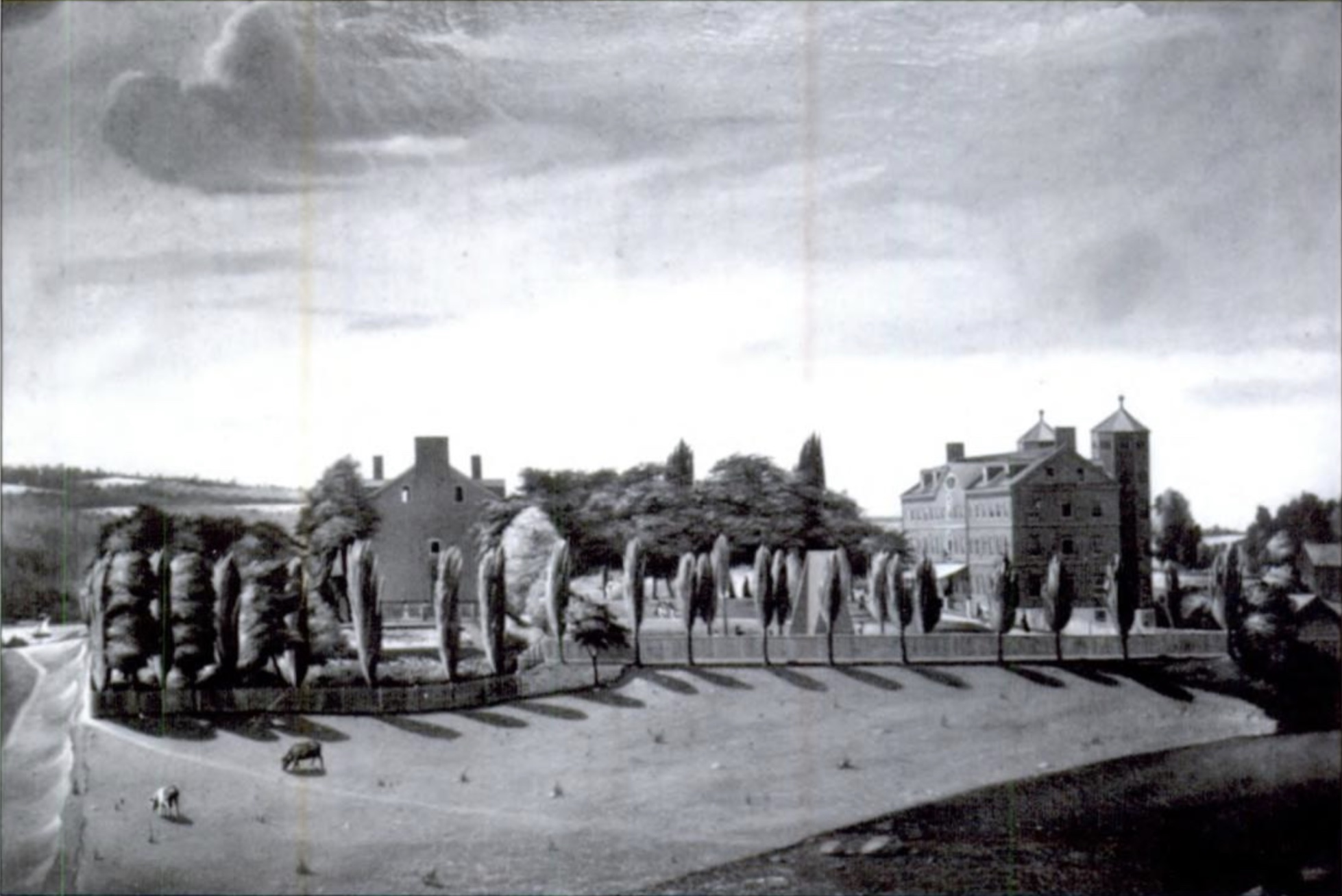
Early depiction of Old North (right) and Old South (left) at Georgetown College

Though Bishop Carroll was aware Plunkett had traveled to the United States seeking of pastoral, rather than educational work, he persuaded the reluctant Plunkett to become the first president of Georgetown College. Carroll concluded that the few other former Jesuits in the United States either could not be removed from important ministries or were not suited to teaching. He had initially sought to name a distinguished English ex-Jesuit as the head of the college, such as Charles Plowden or Robert Molyneux, but they were unwilling to assume the position.

Despite Plunkett's success at growing the faculty and student body, Plunkett increasingly desired the life of a rural missionary in Southern Maryland, the work he had initially come to America to undertake. In December 1792, he submitted his resignation to Carroll, but agreed to remain until a replacement could be found. In June 1793, Carroll named Molyneux to succeed Plunkett as president.

== Later missionary years ==
Following the end of his tenure at Georgetown, Plunkett took up missionary work. Though living in Georgetown, he traveled regularly on horseback throughout Montgomery County, Maryland, where he was given charge of the congregations in Rock Creek, Rockville, Seneca, Barnesville, and Holland's River. He was later stationed in Prince George's County, Maryland, including for a time as pastor of the church in Bladensburg. He was also in charge of Queen's Chapel, a Catholic chapel built on the Queen family estate in Prince George's County.

Despite his preference for rural ministry, Plunkett continued to remain involved in Georgetown College's affairs. When the school was at a deficit of funds for the completion of the Old North Building in 1797, Plunkett donated a sum to aid in its opening. He was also named as one of five original members of Georgetown's board of directors, upon its creation in 1797; he would remain a director until 1808. These directors took measures to reduce the influence of the Sulpicians at the college, one of whom, Louis William Valentine Dubourg, became president of the school.

Plunkett died on January 15, 1815, at Notley Hall in St. Mary's County, Maryland, near the settlement of Chaptico. He was interred in the crypt of the Georgetown Visitation Monastery.

== Notes ==
Academic offices
New office	1st President of Georgetown College; 1791–1793	Succeeded by Robert Molyneux
