= Dubuisson (surname) =

Dubuisson is a French surname. Notable people with the surname include:

- Jacques-Charles Renaud Dubuisson (1666–1739), career soldier, born in France, migrated to Canada in 1685
- Jean Dubuisson (1914–2011), French architect
- Pierre-Ulric Dubuisson (1746–1794), French actor, playwright and theatre director
- Stephen Larigaudelle Dubuisson (1786–1864), French Jesuit priest who immigrated to the United States
- Louis Dubuisson (born 1923), Belgian Colonel ERM, Belgian Armed Forces, Author "La paix nucléaire" (ISBN 978-2-87088-553-6)
- Jean-Christophe Dubuisson (born 1978), Belgian Historian & Author
- Victor Dubuisson (born 1990), French professional golfer
