= List of presidents of Georgetown University =

Heads of Georgetown University

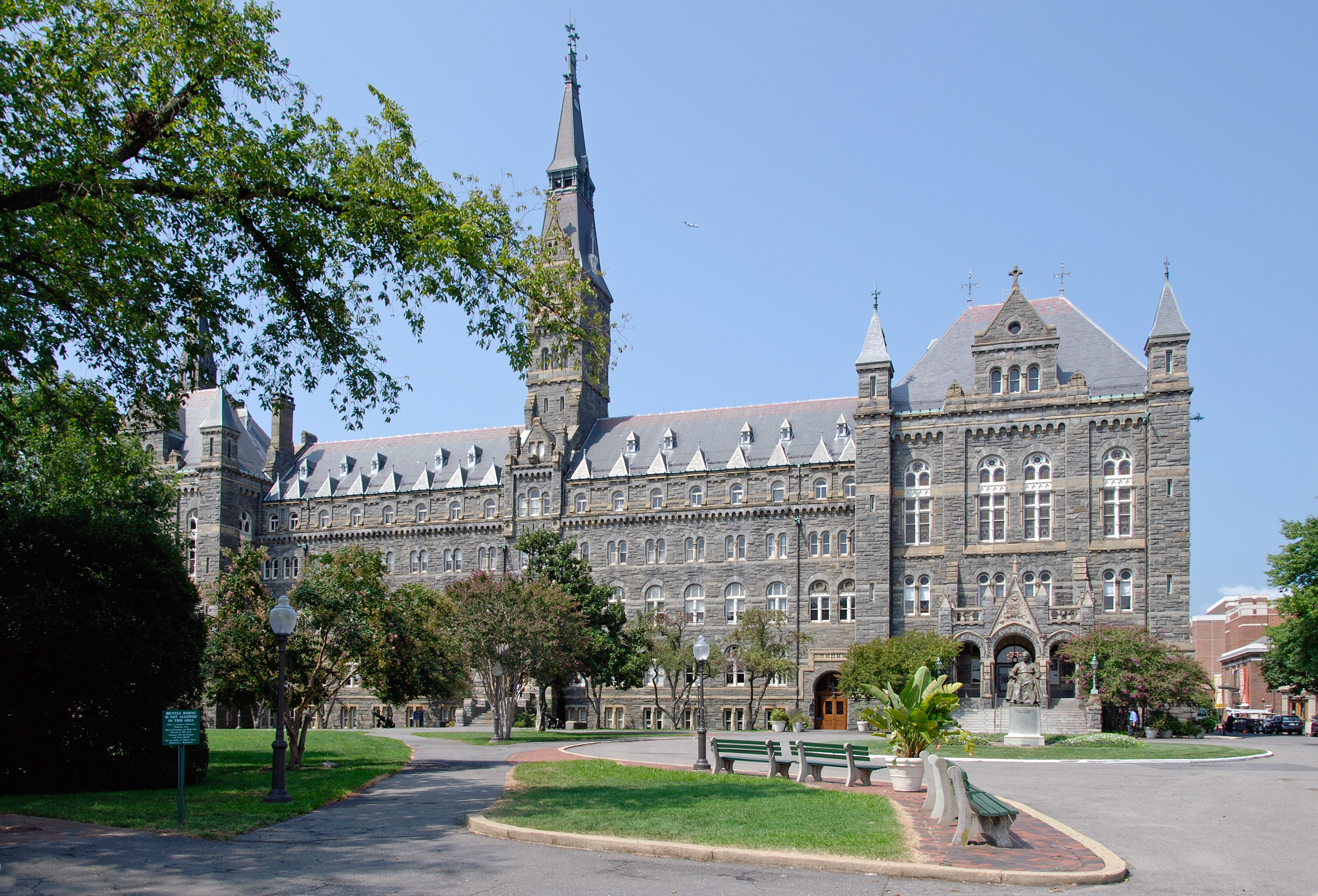
Healy Hall, where the Office of the President is housed

Georgetown University is a private Jesuit research university in Washington, D.C., United States that was founded as Georgetown College by Bishop John Carroll of Baltimore in 1789. The president of Georgetown University is its chief executive officer, and from its establishment until the 1960s was also the rector of the university's Jesuit community. The president is elected by and may be removed by the university's board of directors, and is ex officio a member of the board. The president is also one of five members of the university's legal corporation, known as the President and Directors of Georgetown College, which was first chartered by the United States Congress in 1815.

The president is charged with control over the "business affairs and properties" of the university, and appoints the vice presidents and administrators and, with the concurrence of the board, appoints the provost, secretary, and treasurer of the university. The president may remove any officer, vice president, or administrator by his accord, except the provost, secretary, and treasurer, which require the concurrence of the board. If the office is vacant, then the powers of the presidency are exercised by the provost. The president is among the 100 highest-paid university presidents in the United States.

Of the 41 individuals to have held the office, nearly all have been Jesuits. Only one has been a member of another religious order while president: Louis William Valentine DuBourg, who was a Sulpician. Three presidents have gone on to become bishops: DuBourg, Leonard Neale, and Benedict Joseph Fenwick. Every president has been a Catholic priest except one, John J. DeGioia. Having assumed office on July 1, 2001, DeGioia is the university's longest-serving president. He stepped down on November 21, 2024.

On October 15, 2025, Georgetown announced that Eduardo Peñalver would become the 49th president of the university, effective July 1, 2026.

== Presidents ==
Key
SJ	Society of Jesus
PSS	Society of the Priests of Saint Sulpice

Presidents
No.	Image	Name	Years	Notes	Ref.
1		Robert Plunkett SJ	1791–1793		
2		Robert Molyneux SJ	1793–1796	Superior of the Jesuit Maryland Mission (1805–1808)	
3		Louis William Valentine DuBourg PSS	1796–1798	Founder and President of St. Mary's College (1799–1810); Bishop of Louisiana and the Two Floridas (1815–1826); Bishop of Montauban (1826–1833); Archbishop of Besançon (1833).	
4		Leonard Neale SJ	1798–1806	Coadjutor Bishop of Baltimore (1795–1815); Archbishop of Baltimore (1815–1817)	
5		Robert Molyneux SJ	1806–1808		
6		Francis Neale SJ	1808–1809	Acting president	
7		William Matthews	1809	President of the Washington Seminary (1824–1848). Georgetown alumnus. Was a Jesuit novice only for the duration of his presidency.	
8		Francis Neale SJ	1809–1812		
9		Giovanni Antonio Grassi SJ	1812–1817	Superior of the Jesuit Maryland Mission (1812–1817); Provincial Superior of the Jesuit Province of Turin (1831–1835); Rector of the Pontificio Collegio Urbano de Propaganda Fide (1840–1842). Sometimes referred to as Georgetown's "second founder."	
10		Benedict Joseph Fenwick SJ	1817	Bishop of Boston (1825–1846). Georgetown alumnus.	
11		Anthony Kohlmann SJ	1817–1820	Apostolic Administrator of New York (1810–1815); Superior of the Jesuit Maryland Mission (1817–1819); President of the Washington Seminary (1820–1824).	
12		Enoch Fenwick SJ	1820–1825	Georgetown alumnus	
13		Benedict Joseph Fenwick SJ	1825	Acting president	
14		Stephen Larigaudelle Dubuisson SJ	1825–1826	Georgetown alumnus	
15		William Feiner SJ	1826–1829		
16		John W. Beschter SJ	1829		
17		Thomas F. Mulledy SJ	1829–1838	Provincial Superior of the Jesuit Maryland Province (1837–1840); President of the College of the Holy Cross (1843–1845). Georgetown alumnus.	
18		William McSherry SJ	1838–1839	Provincial Superior of the Jesuit Maryland Province (1833–1837, 1839). Georgetown alumnus.	
19		Joseph A. Lopez SJ	1839–1840	Acting president. First Latin American college president in the United States.	
20		James A. Ryder SJ	1840–1845	Provincial Superior of the Jesuit Maryland Province (1843–1845); President of the College of the Holy Cross (1845–1848); President of Saint Joseph's College (1856–1857). Georgetown alumnus.	
21		Samuel Mulledy SJ	1845	Georgetown alumnus	
22		Thomas F. Mulledy SJ	1845–1848		
23		James A. Ryder SJ	1848–1851		
24		Charles H. Stonestreet SJ	1851–1852	Provincial Superior of the Jesuit Maryland Province (1852–1858); President of Gonzaga College (1858–1860). Georgetown alumnus.	
25		Bernard A. Maguire SJ	1852–1858	Georgetown alumnus	
26		John Early SJ	1858–1865	President of the College of the Holy Cross (1848–1851); President of Loyola College in Maryland (1852–1858, 1866–1870). Georgetown alumnus.	
27		Bernard A. Maguire SJ	1866–1870		
28		John Early SJ	1870–1873		
29		Patrick Francis Healy SJ	1873–1882	Self-identified as white but posthumously recognized as the first black American to become a Jesuit, earn a Ph.D. and become the president of a predominantly white American university. Sometimes referred to as Georgetown's "second founder."	
30		James A. Doonan SJ	1882–1888	Georgetown alumnus	
31		J. Havens Richards SJ	1888–1898		
32		John D. Whitney SJ	1898–1901		
33		Jerome Daugherty SJ	1901–1905		
34		David Hillhouse Buel SJ	1905–1908		
35		Joseph J. Himmel SJ	1908–1912	Rector of St. Andrew-on-Hudson (1915–1921)	
36		Alphonsus J. Donlon SJ	1912–1918	Georgetown alumnus	
37		John B. Creeden SJ	1918–1924		
38		Charles W. Lyons SJ	1924–1928	Rector of Gonzaga College (1908–1909); President of Saint Joseph's College (1909–1914); President of Boston College (1914–1919)	
39		W. Coleman Nevils SJ	1928–1935	President of the University of Scranton (1942–1947)	
40		Arthur A. O'Leary SJ	1935–1942		
41		Lawrence C. Gorman SJ	1942–1949		
42		J. Hunter Guthrie SJ	1949–1952		
43		Edward B. Bunn SJ	1952–1964	President of Loyola College in Maryland (1938–1947)	
44		Gerard J. Campbell SJ	1964–1968		
45		Robert J. Henle SJ	1969–1976		
46		Timothy S. Healy SJ	1976–1989	President of the New York Public Library (1989–1992)	
47		Leo J. O'Donovan SJ	1989–2001	Georgetown alumnus	
48		John J. DeGioia	2001–2024	First lay president of a Jesuit university in the United States. Georgetown alumnus.	
interim		Robert Groves	2024–2026	Georgetown's Executive Vice President and Provost (2012–2024); 23rd Director of the United States Census Bureau (2009–2012)	
49		Eduardo Peñalver	2026	President of Seattle University (2021–2026)	

== See also ==
- History of Georgetown University
- Jesuits in the United States
- List of Georgetown University faculty
