= St. Mary's Church (Lancaster, Pennsylvania) =

Catholic church in Lancaster, Pennsylvania

- Church of the Assumption of the Blessed Virgin Mary
- St. Marien-Kirche (German)
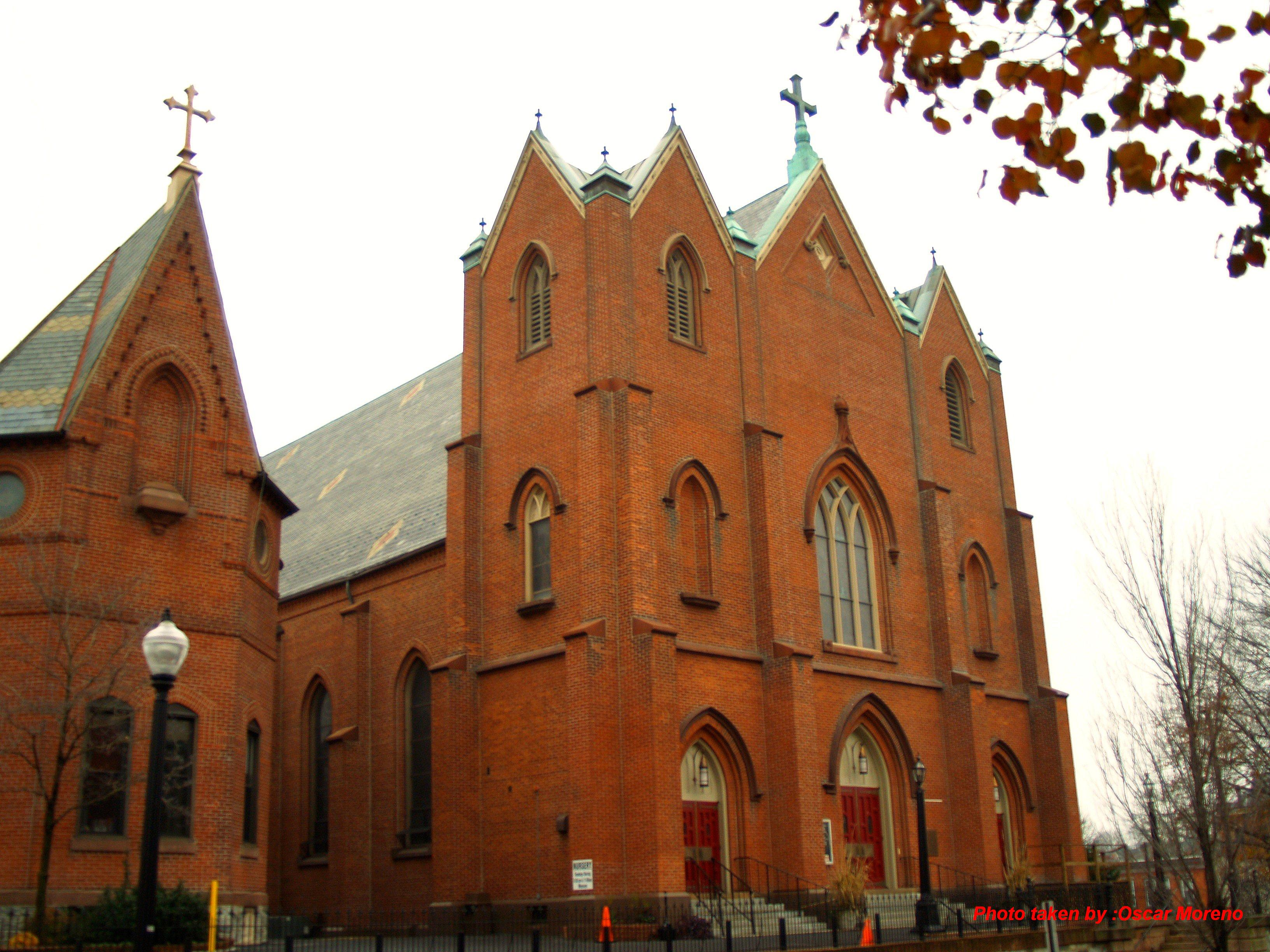
- Historic St. Mary's
- St. Mary's Church
- 40°02′09″N 76°18′24″W
- Location: Lancaster, Pennsylvania
- Country: United States
- Denomination: Catholic
- Website: stmaryslancaster.org

History
- Status: Parish church
- Founded: 1741
- Dedication: Assumption of Mary

Architecture
- Style: Gothic Revival
- Completed: 1854

Administration
- Diocese: Diocese of Harrisburg

The Church of the Assumption of the Blessed Virgin Mary, more commonly known as Historic St. Mary's Church (German: St. Marien-Kirche), is a Roman Catholic church located in Lancaster, Pennsylvania. Founded in 1741, throughout most of its history, the church served the German-speaking Catholics of Lancaster. The parish has had three church buildings over the course of its existence, with the current Gothic Revival brick church being completed in 1854.

== History ==
In June 1741, two German-speaking Jesuits from Maryland arrived in Lancaster, Pennsylvania. They purchased land and built a small log chapel for the German population of Lancaster, giving the mission church the name of St. John Nepomucene. The church operated alongside the many other Christian denominations in Lancaster until one night in December 1760, when the chapel was lit ablaze. The chief burgess (city council chairman) offered a reward for information about the perpetrator, but none was ever found.

Two years passed before a replacement was built. The parishioners quickly built a new stone church, the men gathering limestone from the fields and assembling it into a structure and the women mixing mortar. The cornerstone was laid in 1762. Upon its completion later that year, the church was renamed the Church of the Assumption of the Blessed Virgin Mary and was elevated to the status of a parish. It was also known among the German-speaking parishioners as St. Marien-Kirche (St. Mary's Church).

With tensions between the German and Irish parishioners rising in the mid-19th century, the Irish pastor of St. Mary's encouraged the establishment of St. Joseph's Church in Lancaster, which would serve the German parishioners. With the parish growing, the church sought to build a larger structure to replace the stone church that had served the parish for 120 years. Work was undertaken on a Gothic Revival brick church, whose cornerstone was laid by the Bishop of Philadelphia, John Neumann. The church was completed and consecrated in March 1854. The former stone church continued to be used as a hall for festivals until it was demolished in 1881 in order to construct a school.

Another fire broke out in the church in January 1867, caused by a faulty heater, doing extensive damage, though not destroying the brick exterior. Architect Edwin Forrest Durang oversaw the reconstruction and expansion, which was complete in 1868. The church was re-consecrated on May 3, 1868. The church underwent further expansion from 1885 to 1887, which added the Gothic arches and side chapels. The pastor of the church also invited Italian painter Filippo Costaggini, who was working on the rotunda of the United States Capitol in Washington, D.C., to decorate St. Mary's. The stained glass windows and statute of St. Mary were added between 1888 and 1897.
