= Stephen Larigaudelle Dubuisson =

French Jesuit priest

The Reverend Stephen Larigaudelle Dubuisson SJ
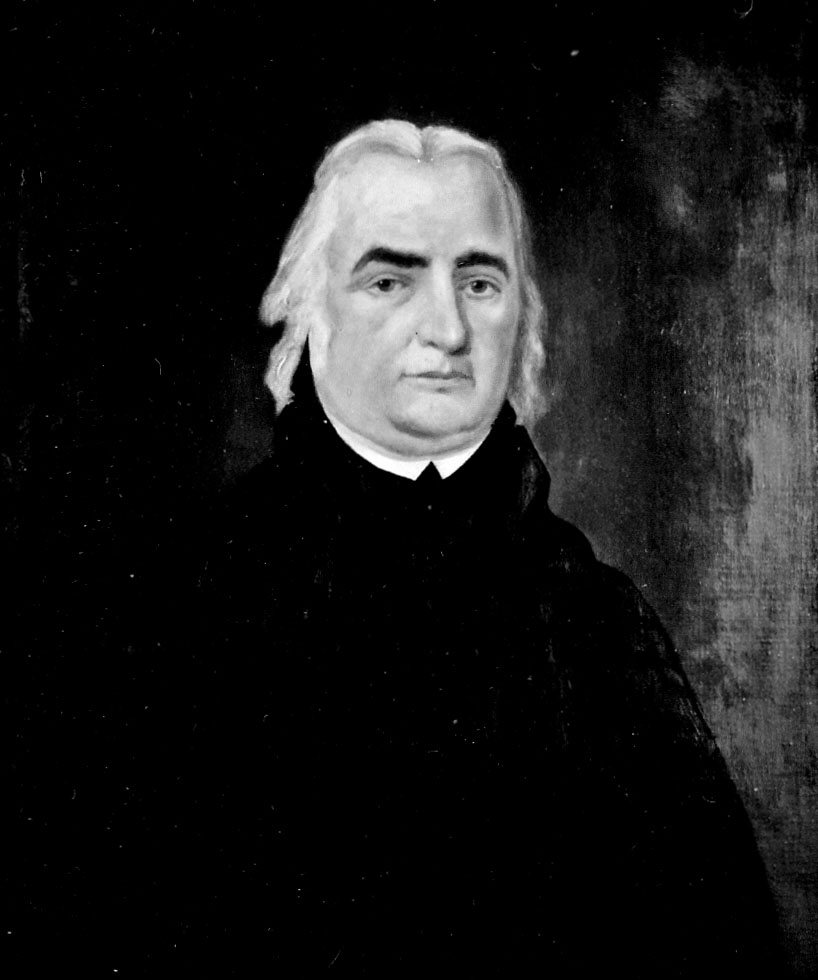

14th President of Georgetown College
- In office 1825–1826
- Preceded by: Benedict Joseph Fenwick
- Succeeded by: William Feiner

Personal details
- Born: Étienne de La Rigaudelle du Buisson; 21 October 1786 Saint-Marc, Saint-Domingue
- Died: 14 August 1864 (aged 77) Pau, Basses-Pyrénées, Second French Empire

Orders
- Ordination: 7 August 1821 by Ambrose Maréchal

Stephen Larigaudelle Dubuisson SJ (born Étienne de La Rigaudelle du Buisson; 21 October 1786 – 14 August 1864) was a French Catholic priest and Jesuit missionary to the United States.

Born to a wealthy family in Saint-Domingue, Dubuisson fled the Haitian Revolution for France, where he entered the civil service and rose to senior positions in Napoleon's imperial court. In 1815, he decided to enter the Society of Jesus and sailed for the United States. He engaged in pastoral work in Maryland and Washington, D.C., before becoming the president of Georgetown College in 1825. An austere personality, his leadership of the school was not successful. He suffered a nervous breakdown and was sent to recover in Rome in 1826, where he met Jan Roothaan, the Jesuit Superior General. Upon returning to the United States, he acted as a close confidant of Roothaan.

Dubuisson spent the next two decades engaged in pastoral work in Maryland, Virginia, and Philadelphia. He also traveled Europe, fundraising for the American Jesuits among the royalty and nobility. In 1841, he permanently returned to France and spent his later years as chaplain to the family and manor of Duke Mathieu de Montmorency in Borgo San Dalmazzo, and then as a parish priest in Toulouse.

== Early life ==
Étienne de La Rigaudelle du Buisson was born on 21 October 1786, in the town of Saint-Marc in the French Caribbean colony of Saint-Domingue, where the La Rigaudelle du Buisson family owned two plantations that produced cotton and indigo dye. His mother was Marie-Elizabeth-Louise Poirer, who was born in Fort-Dauphin. His father, Anne-Joseph-Sylvestre de La Rigaudelle du Buisson, was born in Saint-Marc in 1748, at the family's home in the center of Saint-Marc. His family was wealthy and enjoyed the high social status of the grand-blancs; it also had connections to the French minor nobility.

Du Duisson was the second son of his parents and was reared by one of the family's house slaves, who acted as his wet nurse. Étienne was named after his godfather, François-Étienne Théard, the French lieutenant governor of Saint-Marc. His mother died in December 1791, and his father married Adélaïde-Marie Favereau of Saint-Nicolas in May of that year. Their marriage produced several daughters.

=== Escape to France ===
In light of the impending Haitian Revolution, du Buisson's father sent him (at the age of five) and his brothers, Noël-Marie and Joseph, to Nantes, France, sometime between March and May 1791. It would be many years before du Buisson would see his father again, who remained in Saint Domingue; he would never see his mother again. Though they were escaping impending violence in Saint-Domingue, the brothers soon encountered a very different kind in France. Arriving in the midst of the French Revolution, the boys survived the Reign of Terror, and the massacres of the War in the Vendée, including the occupation of Nantes by the Catholic and Royal Armies in 1792.

Du Buisson never received a formal education in his youth, a fact that he lamented later in life. Nonetheless, he likely studied in secret under the tutelage of a non-juror priest who had not sworn allegiance to the Civil Constitution of the Clergy. In addition, du Buisson studied literature and poetry on his own, and came to be fluent in English by the age of 15. He would eventually come to speak seven languages: English, French, German, Italian, Spanish, Latin, and Ancient Greek, and have a working knowledge of Hebrew.

== French civil service ==
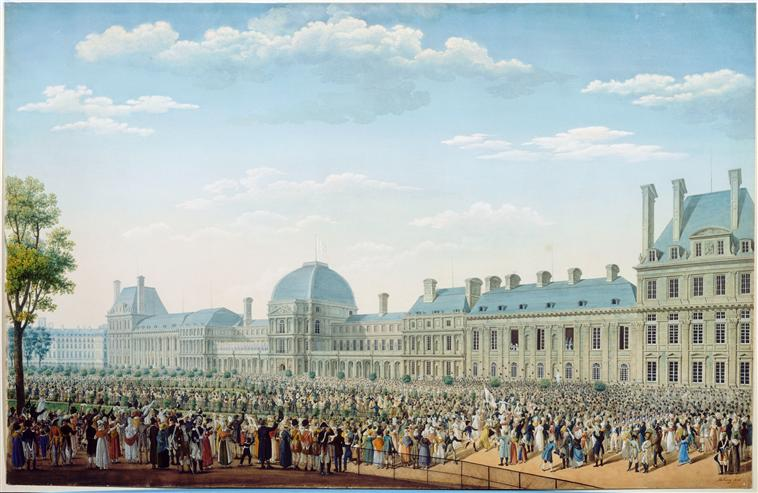
Dubuisson lived in the Tuileries Palace (depicted in the early 1800s) for two years.

Du Buisson received some education at a military school in Paris, and in 1804 or 1805, du Buisson sat for and passed the agrégation (the French civil service exam) at the Congrégation de la Sainte-Vierge in Nantes. One of his assignments was in the receiver general's office of the French Army, where he was stationed in Germany during the Napoleonic Wars and worked in the Army of the Rhine from May 1809 to March 1810. He was then assigned to occupied Vienna from 1811 to 1814, first as assistant cashier of the special crown land and then as assistant cashier of the crown treasury.

Du Buisson then returned to France, where he resided in an apartment in the royal Tuileries Palace in Paris, serving as the cashier-comptroller of the crown from December 1814 to June 1815. During this time, he befriended Baron François Roullet de La Bouillerie, a member of the Conseil d'État and the intendant of the treasury of the civil list. Du Buisson retained his employment in the civil service through the abdication of Napoleon and the restoration of Louis XVIII as King of France, which allowed him to support his family members. During this time, he would pay visits to the sick in Parisian hospitals alongside young nobles, including Viscount Mathieu de Montmorency and Count Alexis de Noailles. He also undertook independent study and learned to play the violin.

== Missionary to the United States ==
When du Buisson first expressed his desire to enter religious life at the age of 29, his family was staunchly opposed. Nonetheless, he decided to enter the Society of Jesus, whose suppression by the pope had been recently lifted. Unbeknownst to his family, Dubisson set sail for the United States with the Sulpician priest Simon Bruté, whose order was active in North America.

He arrived in New York City on 21 November 1815 and then traveled south to Georgetown College in Washington, D.C., arriving on 1 December. From there, he proceeded to the Jesuit novitiate at White Marsh Manor in Prince George's County, Maryland, entering the Jesuit order 15 December 1815. At this time, he also began anglicizing his name as Stephen Larigaudelle Dubuisson.

=== Georgetown College ===
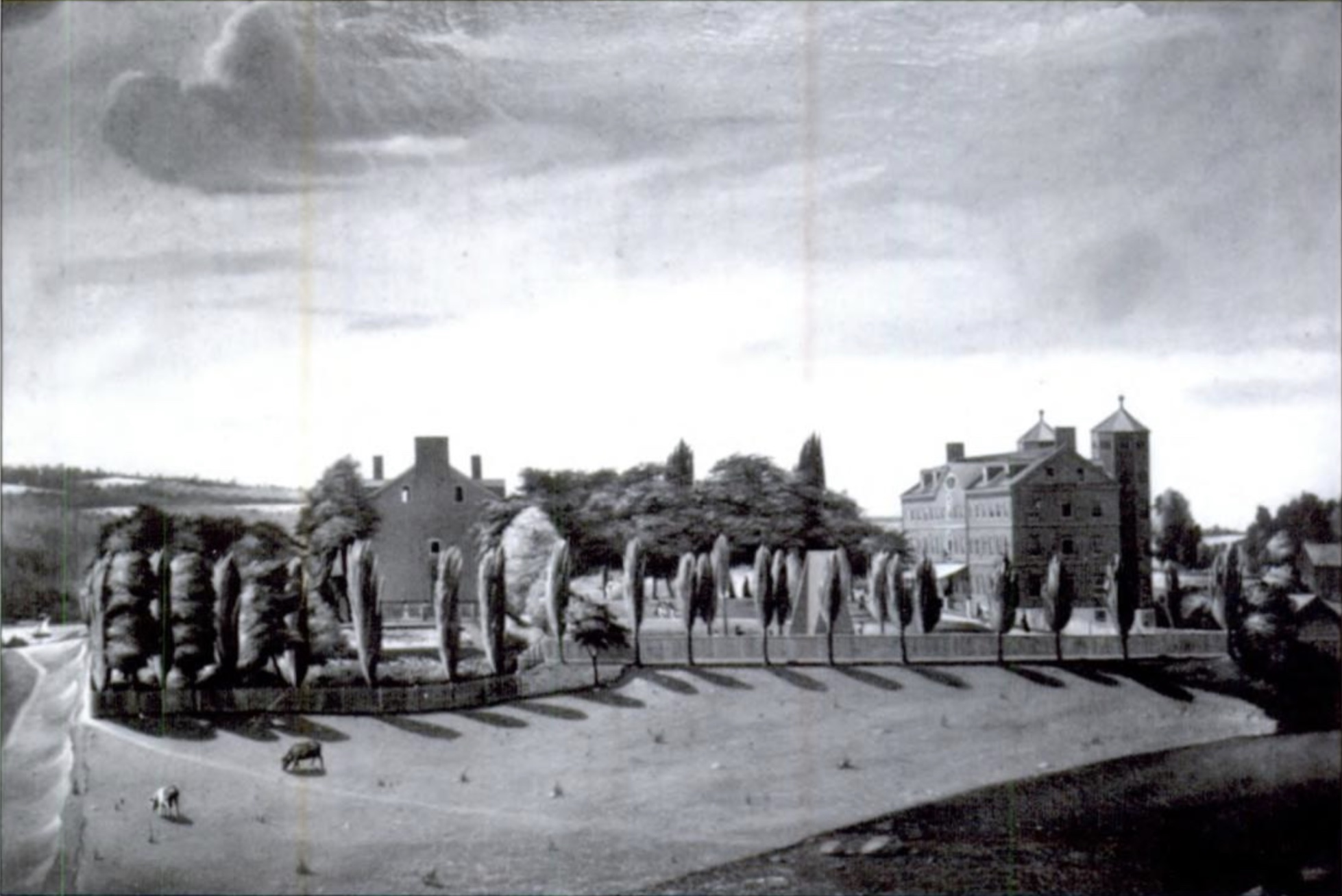
Early depiction of Georgetown College

Before long, Dubuisson returned to Georgetown for his religious studies. Dubuisson found himself in the midst of tensions between the Anglo-American Jesuits, who adopted republicanism and American culture, and their Continental European counterparts who were more traditional and austere. For this reason, he was disliked by his Anglo-American peers, despite being considered refined; likewise, Dubuisson regarded them as irreverent.

In 1816, he was appointed prefect by the president of the college, Giovanni Grassi; his appointment was renewed again for the 1817–1818 academic year under Grassi's successor, Anthony Kohlmann. In this role, Kohlmann charged him with enforcing stricter discipline among the students. The students were so incensed by this that in 1818 they plotted to ambush Dubuisson and kill him with penknives and stones. Kohlmann discovered the plot moments before it was to be carried out, causing a revolt during supper. Between six and eight students were expelled as a result.

While prefect, Dubisson continued his study of Latin, English, logic, and metaphysics. He professed his first vows on 26 December 1817, and was made the director of the Jesuit scholastics. That year, he began his four-year course of theology at the Washington Seminary (later known as Gonzaga College High School), and on 7 August 1821, was ordained a priest at Georgetown College by the Archbishop of Baltimore, Ambrose Maréchal.

Following his ordination, Dubuisson began his pastoral work, first at St. Patrick's Church, where he was made an assistant to William Matthews. During this time, he was involved in what some considered to be the miraculous cure of Ann Mattingly, an ill Washingtonian. He presented a sworn public statement of his account of the events and purported miracle, and published a pamphlet, whose French language version was circulated around Europe. Dubuisson also developed a reputation as an eloquent preacher among Washington's high society.

==== Presidency ====
On 9 September 1825, Dubuisson was appointed to succeed Benedict Joseph Fenwick as the president of Georgetown College, despite the fact that he not only considered himself unsuited for administration but desired to leave Georgetown altogether. Concurrent with his presidency, Dubuisson served as the pastor of Holy Trinity Church in Georgetown. His reputation as a severe disciplinarian resulted in declining student enrollment, and he soon requested that the Jesuit Superior General, Luigi Fortis, relieve him of the office. During his short tenure, he experienced what one historian described as a nervous breakdown. While in the infirmary, Dubuisson reported hearing a voice that told him to draw strength from the Sacred Heart. After just seven months, in April 1826, Fortis allowed Dubuisson to resign as president, and named William Feiner as his successor.

== European interlude ==
Recognizing that Dubuisson was experiencing a crisis of faith, the Jesuit mission superior, Francis Dzierozynski, sent him to Rome at his own expense and without the permission of the Superior General in the hope that he could resolve his doubts there. As a pretext for his departure, Dzierozynski charged him with visiting various French cities to raise money to finance the return voyage of a group of Maryland Jesuits who had gone to Europe, and he resided in Marseille for a time. This fundraising effort was not successful.

Dubuisson settled in Rome on 1 November 1826, to begin his tertianship. For the next year, he would also serve as an advisor to the Superior General on American affairs, before being sent to the University of Turin. Dubuisson became proficient in Italian and enjoyed the religious life in Turin. When Jan Roothaan succeeded Fortis as Superior General, he called Dubuisson to Rome, where Dubuisson professed his final vows in 1829, becoming a full member of the Jesuit order.

== Return to the United States ==
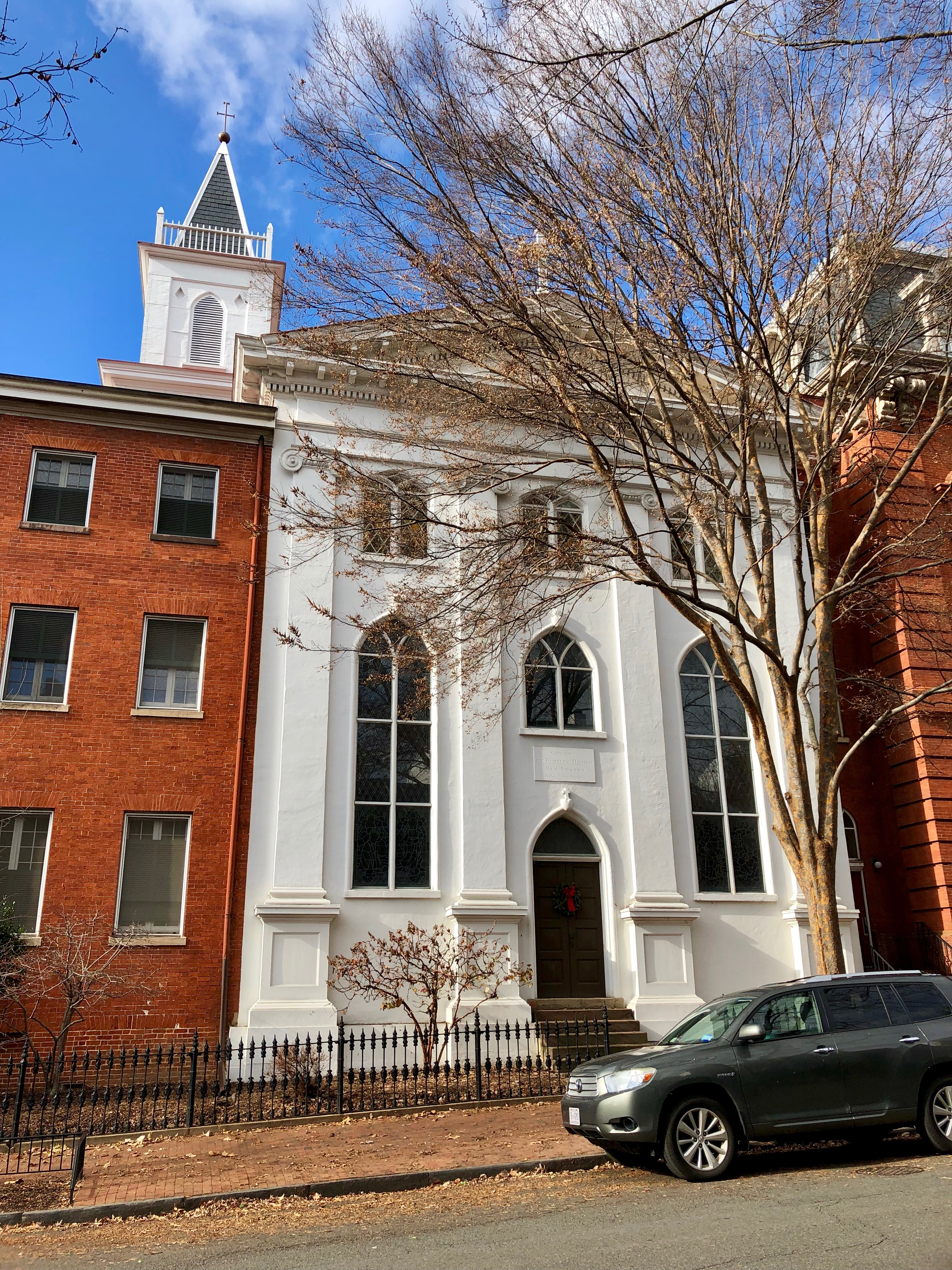
Dubuisson served as confessor to the nuns at the Georgetown Visitation Monastery.

In August 1829, Roothaan sent Dubuisson back to the United States with the responsibility of keeping him informed about the affairs of the Jesuits' Maryland mission. During his travels through Europe on the way to America, he was successful in raising funds for the Maryland Jesuits among wealthy French and Italian nobles. On 23 October, Dubuisson departed Le Havre, France for New York City, from where he traveled to Frederick, Maryland. Soon thereafter, the Archbishop of Baltimore, James Whitfield, assigned him to Newtown Manor, from where he would oversee all the Jesuit parishes in St. Mary's County.

Dubuisson's assignment to rural Maryland did not last long, as by the following year, he again returned to Georgetown as the prefect of studies. He also taught French there, and became the de facto confessor of the nuns of the Georgetown Visitation Monastery and of the students at their school, the Georgetown Visitation Academy. With the arrival of Peter Kenney as visitor to the Maryland mission in 1830, Roothaan appointed Dubuisson as one of Kenney's four consultors. As the Jesuits debated whether to sell their farms in Maryland, which would significantly change the character of the order in the United States, Dubuisson argued against such a decision, believing landownership afforded them security in the event of economic disaster.

Dubuisson's position was also motivated by the fact that the farms were worked by slaves owned by the Jesuits. He believed that while the institution of slavery was not itself immoral, the Jesuits had an obligation not to sell their slaves to immoral slaveowners who would abuse them or deprive them of food, clothing, some degree of education, and the right to marry. He viewed abolitionism as dangerously idealistic and capable of producing a Reign of Terror similar to the one he lived through in France, while also ultimately harming the freed slaves. However, he would later oppose on moral grounds the Maryland Jesuits' sale of their slaves in 1838. Dubuisson also praised the racially integrated Masses he observed in parts of Maryland, where blacks and whites received the Eucharist and sang in the choir on equal status.

=== Maryland and Pennsylvania pastoral work ===
Despite his experience in academia, Dubuisson's primary talents were in pastoral work. Therefore, soon after arriving, Kenney sent Dubuisson back to Frederick, where he assisted John McElroy in running St. John's Literary Institution and in his pastoral work. This transfer was due in part to the fact that Kenney believed it improper for a Jesuit, especially a young one, to be the confessor of nuns and female students, as it created opportunity for sexual impropriety. His pastoral work took ranged from St. Patrick's Church in Washington to St. Francis Xavier Church on the rural Newtown Manor. As such, he ministered to a wide diversity of parishioners, including prominent, established Maryland families, white immigrants who fled Haiti, black slaves, and Protestant converts.

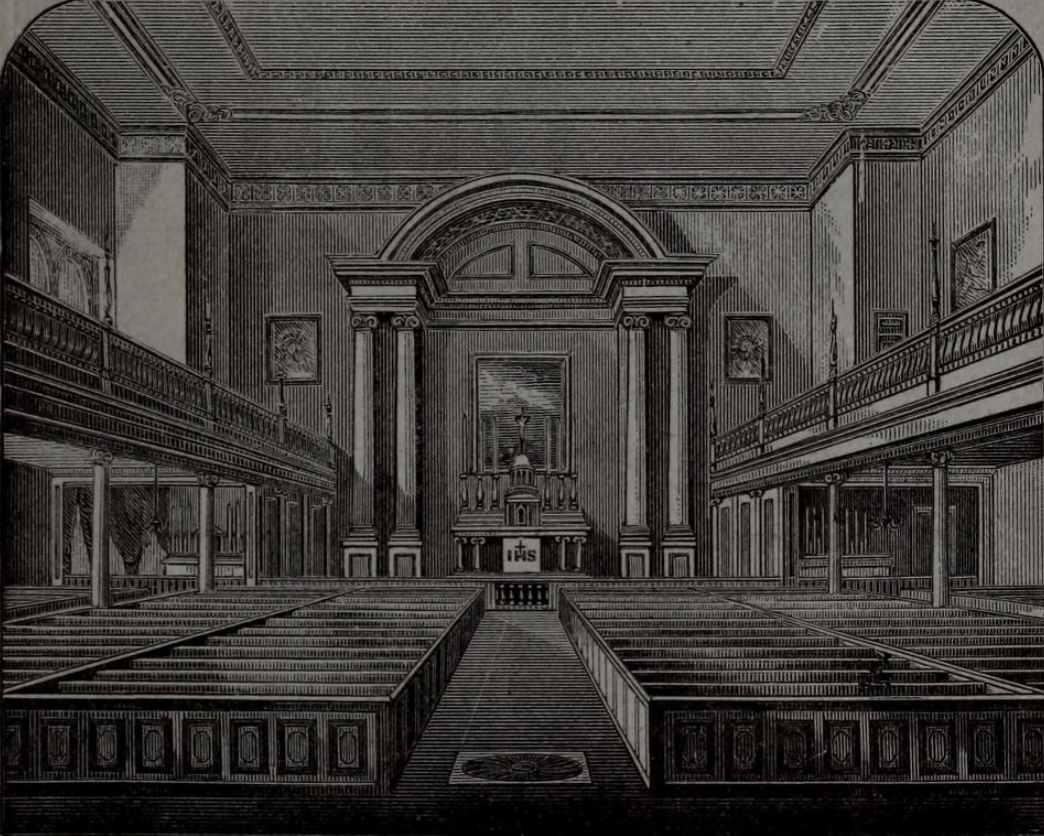
Interior of Old St. Joseph's Church in the 19th century

Over time, Dubuisson became a close confidant of Kenney, and the visitor eventually sent Dubuisson to Philadelphia in 1831, where he was to organize the return of the Jesuits to Old St. Joseph's Church. In August of that year, Dubuisson was transferred back to Georgetown, once again becoming the pastor of Holy Trinity Church, where he replaced John Van Lommel. There, he revived the parochial school's Sodality of Our Lady. The parochial school had long suffered from sporadic funding, which forced it to intermittently close. Dubuisson secured a grant from Congress and raised additional funds, which put the school on stable financial footing. In 1831, Dubuisson also was made socius (Note: A socius is an important assistant to the superior of a Jesuit province or mission.) to the superior of the Jesuits' Maryland mission, and continued as socius to Peter Kenney, when he took over leadership of the mission as visitor.

In February 1833, Dubuisson returned to Philadelphia as a priest at Old St. Joseph's Church, newly returned to Jesuit control; he became the pastor of the church in April of that year. He was succeeded at Holy Trinity Church by James F. M. Lucas. While assigned to St. Joseph's, Dubuisson also made a trip to Silver Lake, as the Catholics of northeastern Pennsylvania had few priests. During this time, with the support of Archbishop Whitfield of Baltimore, Dubuisson was nominated for several bishoprics. His name was first proposed to become the Bishop of Cincinnati, and then as the Archbishop of New Orleans; John England, the Bishop of Charleston then sought to convince him to become the Archbishop of Saint-Domingue or a missionary to Liberia. However, Dubuisson desired to remain a pastor, and appealed directly to Pope Gregory XVI.

== Fundraising abroad ==
Dubuisson returned to Maryland in 1835, for the Jesuits' provincial congregation, where he was elected as the Maryland province's delegate to a meeting of procurators from every Jesuit province in the world, the first such delegate from North America to attend a procurators' meeting. In anticipation of the congregation, he prepared a report on the state of affairs of the Maryland province, which he would present to the Superior General upon his arrival in Rome. After a long journey through Europe, he arrived in Rome on 23 November 1835.

After the congregation, Dubuisson traveled extensively throughout Europe, paying frequent visits to the royal courts of Vienna, Munich, Milan, Turin, Lyon, and Paris, and became well acquainted with many of the royalty and nobility. To this end, he was the first of the American Jesuits sent to Europe to succeed in raising a substantial amount of money, and improved the European perception of the American Jesuits.

== Virginia ministry ==
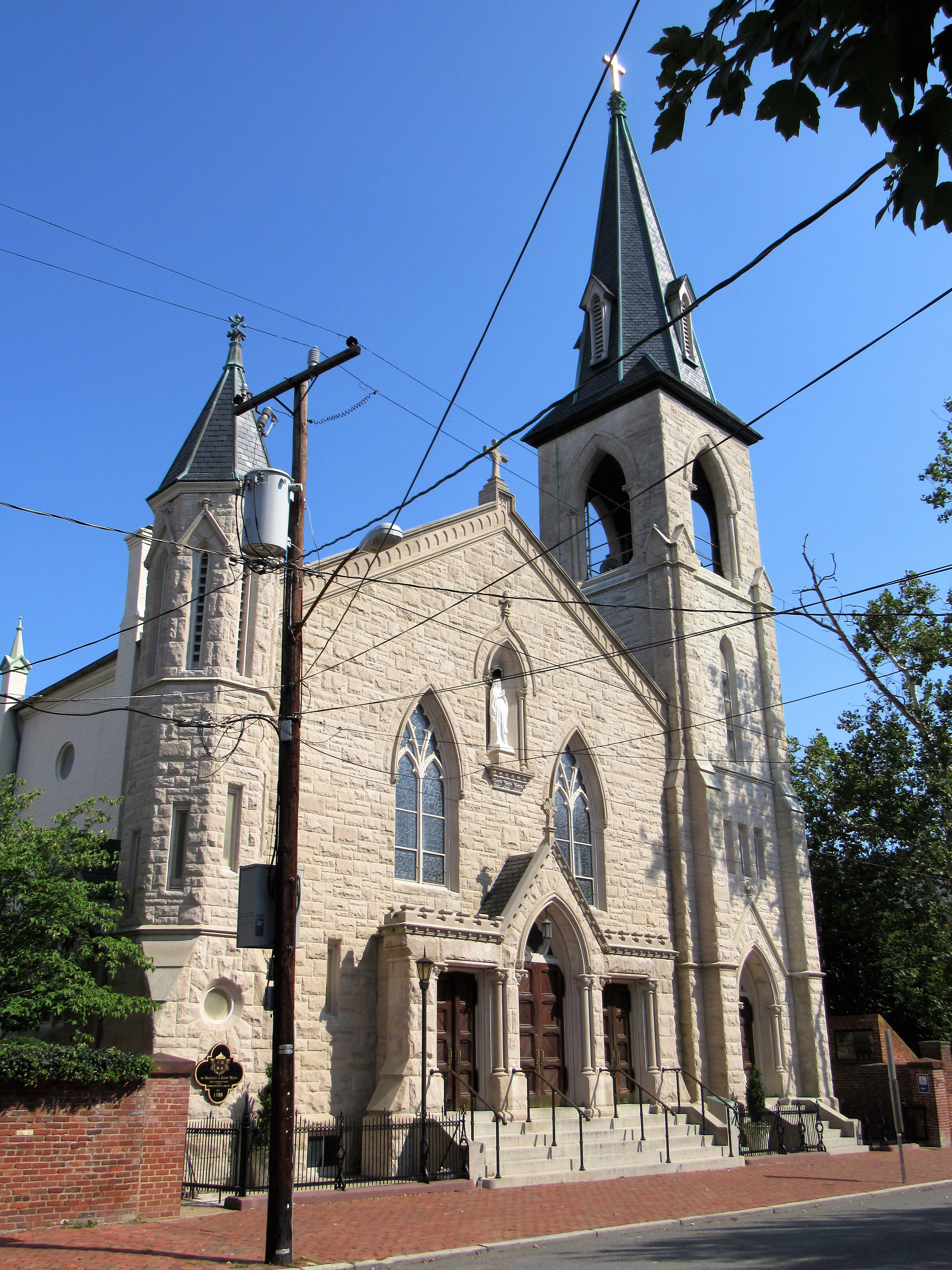
Dubuisson was pastor of St. Mary's Church in Virginia for four years.

In 1837, Dubuisson returned to the United States. The provincial superior, William McSherry, assigned him as the acting pastor of St. Mary's Church in Alexandria, Virginia, where he was to repair the divisions among parishioners that persisted from an attempted schism 20 years earlier. On 8 July 1837, McSherry made his appointment permanent, replacing John Smith, who McSherry considered to have poorly managed the parish. In addition to his pastoral duties, Dubuisson taught French at St. Mary's parochial school, three-quarters of whose students were Protestant, and held catechism classes for both the church's white and black parishioners. He was successful in reducing the church's debt that had accrued under Smith. He also returned to his position as confessor to the Georgetown Visitation Monastery. During his pastorate, he made trips to the small churches of rural St. Mary's County, Maryland. From 1837 to 1839, Dubuisson was also the principal of St. John's Academy in Alexandria, the only Catholic military school in the United States at the time.

In 1838, Dubuisson contracted a severe case of laryngitis, which physicians in Washington and Philadelphia were unable to treat. Therefore, Dubuisson once again sailed for France, ending his tenure at St. Mary's on 1 January 1841. The French physicians recommended that a change of climate might improve his symptoms, and Dubuisson left for Rome later that year. His condition, however, would develop into laryngeal dystonia and remained with him for the rest of his life.

== Later years ==
In Rome, Dubuisson once again represented the Maryland province at the Jesuit procurators' meeting of 1841. After the meeting, he took up residence in Marseille, France. During this time, he sought the help of the Norman physician and Trappist monk Pierre Jean Corneille Debreyne. On 17 November 1842, Dubuisson arrived at the manor of his longtime friend, Duke Mathieu de Montmorency, in Borgo San Dalmazzo, where he became the chaplain to the ducal family and manor. During the 1848 revolutions that swept Europe, the Jesuits were expelled from Northern Italy. Despite persecution of the Jesuits, Dubuisson was able to remain due to the intervention of the American chargé d'affaires in Turin; therefore, he was likely the last remaining Jesuit in Northern Italy.

With the death of Duke Mathieu in 1851, Dubuisson became the de facto interim mayor of the Montmorency manor. In November 1852, Roothaan granted Dubuisson's request to rejoin a Jesuit community, and transferred him to the Jesuit province of Toulouse, where he became a parish priest. In October 1861, Dubuisson moved to the Jesuit retirement home in Pau, Basses-Pyrénées, where he died on 14 August 1864.

== Notes ==
Academic offices
Preceded by Benedict Joseph Fenwick	14th President of Georgetown College; 1825–1826	Succeeded by William Feiner
Preceded by John Smith	2nd Principal of St. John's Academy; 1837–1839	Succeeded by John H. Kellenberger
Catholic Church titles
Preceded by Theodore M. DeTheux	4th Pastor of Holy Trinity Church; 1825–1826	Succeeded by John Smith
Preceded by John Van Lommel	7th Pastor of Holy Trinity Church; 1831–1833	Succeeded by James F. M. Lucas
Preceded by –	Pastor of Old St. Joseph's Church; 1833–1835	Succeeded by –
Preceded by John Smith	Pastor of St. Mary's Church; 1837–1841	Succeeded by –
