= Cuvée des Trolls =

Belgian beer

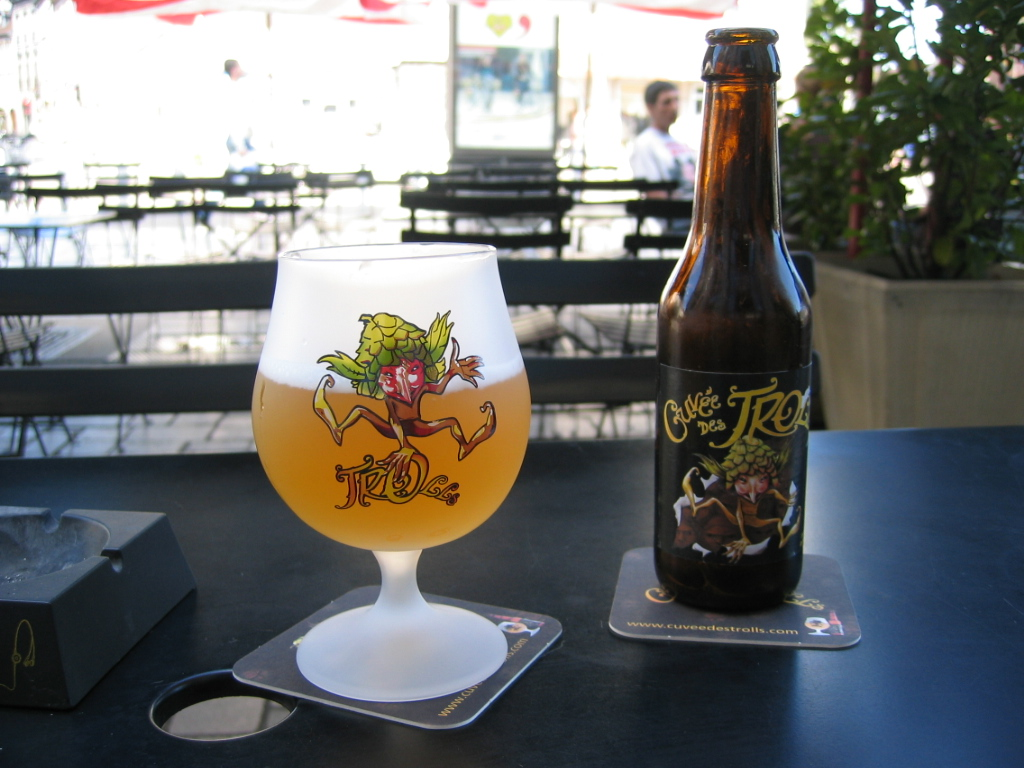
- Type: Ale
- Manufacturer: Dubuisson Brewery
- Introduced: 2000
- Website: www.cuveedestrolls.com

Cuvée des Trolls is a beer brewed at the Dubuisson Brewery in Pipaix in Belgium and also by the Brasse-Temps micro-breweries in Louvain-la-Neuve and Mons. Its logo is a little troll with a pointy nose, who is wearing a green hat which is a hop cone.

== Characteristics ==
This is a lager beer, filtered or unfiltered, refreshing and scented, with a fuller taste and well balanced, and contains 7% alcohol by volume.

This beer is brewed from sweet must to which hops and dried orange peels are added. This is a beer fermentation (a temperature of fermentation of 23 °C during one week). The beer brewed by Brasse-Temps is not filtered and just decanted, so there is still some yeast. It tastes better served at 3 °C.

It is available in bottle or in keg.

== History ==
Cuvée des Trolls has been brewed from September 2000 by the micro-brewery Brasse-Temps, created by the Dubuisson Brewery in Louvain-la-Neuve. The success was immediate in this student city and then the Dubuisson Brewery launch the beer in Wallonia, then in Brussels and finally in the Flemish Region and abroad. In 2003, another le Brasse-Temps was created in Mons and in 2005 the production reached 5000 hectolitres.
