= Dubuisson Brewery =

Brewery in Hainaut, Belgium

Coordinates: 50°35′17″N 3°32′33″E

Brasserie Dubuisson Frères
- Industry: Alcoholic beverage
- Founded: 1769
- Headquarters: Pipaix, Belgium
- Products: Beer
- Production output: 18000 hl
- Owner: Vincent Dubuisson
- Website: http://www.br-dubuisson.com/

The Dubuisson Brewery (Brasserie Dubuisson Frères) is a Belgian family brewery founded in 1769 in Pipaix, province of Hainaut. They brew one of the strongest beers in Belgium, the Bush Ambrée at 12% ABV.

== History ==
Founded in 1769 by farmer Joseph Leroy, the brewery only sold its beer to the workers in the farm and to the inhabitants of the town of Pipaix where the brewery was installed. In 1931, the brothers Alfred and Amédée Dubuisson, descendants of Joseph Leroy, decided to abandon the farm and to concentrate on the production of beer. The beers were meant to be a mix of English and Belgian beers (due to the growing success of English beers at the time), so the name of the beer was English and the production method used both English and Belgian techniques.

The current brewery is still located at the same place and still owned by the Dubuisson family.

== Beers ==
Dubuisson produce 4 different top fermented, filtered beers, all of which carry the brand name "Bush", which comes from a translation of the family name du Buisson.

- Bush 7% (7.5% ABV), green label, also known as Scaldis or Clovis for export, was first brewed in 1994 to celebrate the 225th anniversary of the brewery. It is made of aromatic Czech hops, coriander and caramel malt.
- Bush blonde (10.5% ABV), yellow label, was first brewed in 1998 at the 65th anniversary of the Bush ambrée.
- Bush de Noël (12% ABV), blue label, is brewed in small quantities and is to be drunk at the end of each year. It is brewed using the technique of houblonnage à cru (dry hopping), and also contains caramel malt in large quantities, which gives the beer a red-amber colour. It was introduced in 1991.
- Bush Ambrée (12% ABV), orange label, first brewed by Alfred Dubuisson, grandfather of the current master brewer Hughes Dubuisson, in 1933. It was formerly known as Bush 12%. It was renamed after its amber colour due to the usage of caramel malt.

All are available in 25cl bottles, and 33cl bottles for exportation, while the Bush de Noël is also sold in magnum (1.5l). The Bush 7% and Bush de Noël are also available in 20l and 30l barrels.

They also produce:

- Cuvée des Trolls (7% ABV) is a blond beer. Dried orange peel is used in its production.

In addition to the original brewery in Pipaix (in the municipality of Leuze-en-Hainaut), the brewery has, since 2000, started four microbreweries, one in Louvain la Neuve, one in Mons, one in Tournai and one in Charleroi.
