= Conewago Township, Adams County, Pennsylvania =

Township in Pennsylvania, US

Coordinates: 39°47′30″N 77°01′59″W

- Township
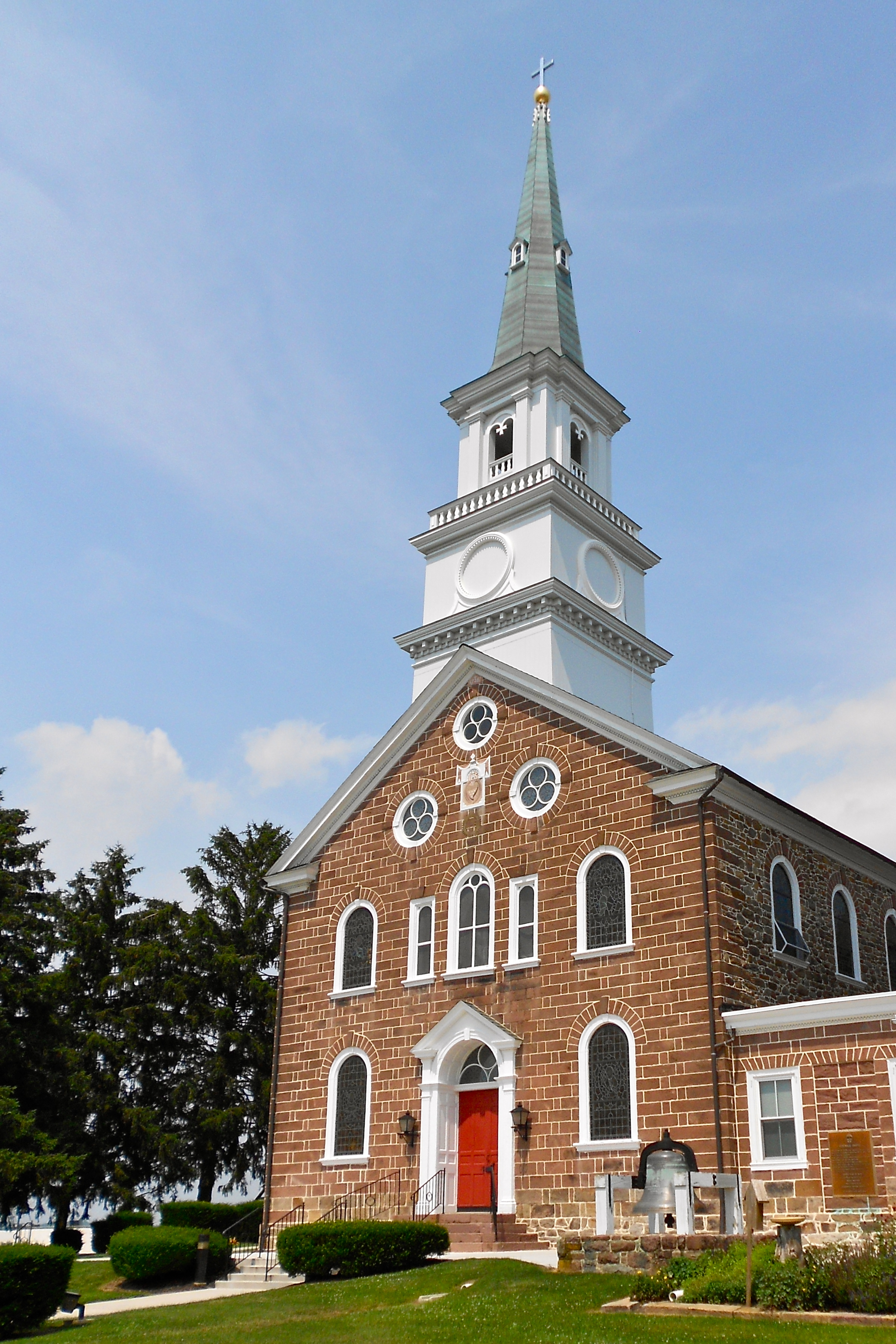
- Basilica of the Sacred Heart of Jesus

- Logo

- Location in Adams County and the state of Pennsylvania.
- Country: United States
- State: Pennsylvania
- County: Adams
- Settled: 1731
- Incorporated: 1801

Area
  - Total: 10.45 sq mi (27.07 km^{2})
  - Land: 10.39 sq mi (26.90 km^{2})
  - Water: 0.066 sq mi (0.17 km^{2})

Population (2020)
  - Total: 7,869
  - Estimate (2023): 7,996
  - Density: 690.5/sq mi (266.61/km^{2})
- Time zone: UTC-5 (Eastern (EST))
  - Summer (DST): UTC-4 (EDT)
- Area code: 717
- FIPS code: 42-001-15632
- Website: www.conewagotwp.us

Conewago Township is a township in Adams County, Pennsylvania, United States. The population was 7,869 at the 2020 census.

== Geography ==
Conewago Township is located along the eastern edge of Adams County, adjacent to the borough of Hanover in neighboring York County. Conewago Township completely surrounds the borough of McSherrystown. It contains the census-designated place of Midway.

According to the United States Census Bureau, the township has a total area of 10.5 square miles (27.2 km^{2}), of which 10.4 square miles (27.0 km^{2}) is land and 0.077 square miles (0.2 km^{2}), or 0.62%, is water.

== Demographics ==
Historical population
Census	Pop.	Note	%±
2000	5,709		—
2010	7,085		24.1%
2020	7,869		11.1%
2023 (est.)	7,996		1.6%

As of the census of 2000, there were 5,709 people, 2,128 households, and 1,655 families residing in the township. The population density was 545.4 inhabitants per square mile (210.6/km^{2}). There were 2,189 housing units at an average density of 209.1 units per square mile (80.7 units/km^{2}). The racial makeup of the township was 97.92% White, 0.53% African American, 0.04% Native American, 0.16% Asian, 0.77% from other races, and 0.60% from two or more races. Hispanic or Latino of any race were 1.58% of the population.

There were 2,128 households, out of which 36.7% had children under the age of 18 living with them, 65.9% were married couples living together, 8.3% had a female householder with no husband present, and 22.2% were non-families. 17.3% of all households were made up of individuals, and 7.3% had someone living alone who was 65 years of age or older. The average household size was 2.68 and the average family size was 3.03.

In the township the population was spread out, with 25.7% under the age of 18, 7.0% from 18 to 24, 33.3% from 25 to 44, 22.4% from 45 to 64, and 11.6% who were 65 years of age or older. The median age was 36 years. For every 100 females there were 95.4 males. For every 100 females age 18 and over, there were 94.9 males.

The median income for a household in the township was $47,920, and the median income for a family was $49,688. Males had a median income of $32,378 versus $25,385 for females. The per capita income for the township was $18,434. About 2.9% of families and 3.8% of the population were below the poverty line, including 3.6% of those under age 18 and 3.7% of those age 65 or over.

== Sites of interest ==
The Basilica of the Sacred Heart of Jesus is located in the township.
