= Basilica of the Sacred Heart of Jesus, Conewago =

Historic church in Pennsylvania, United States

- Conewago Chapel
- U.S. National Register of Historic Places
- Pennsylvania state historical marker
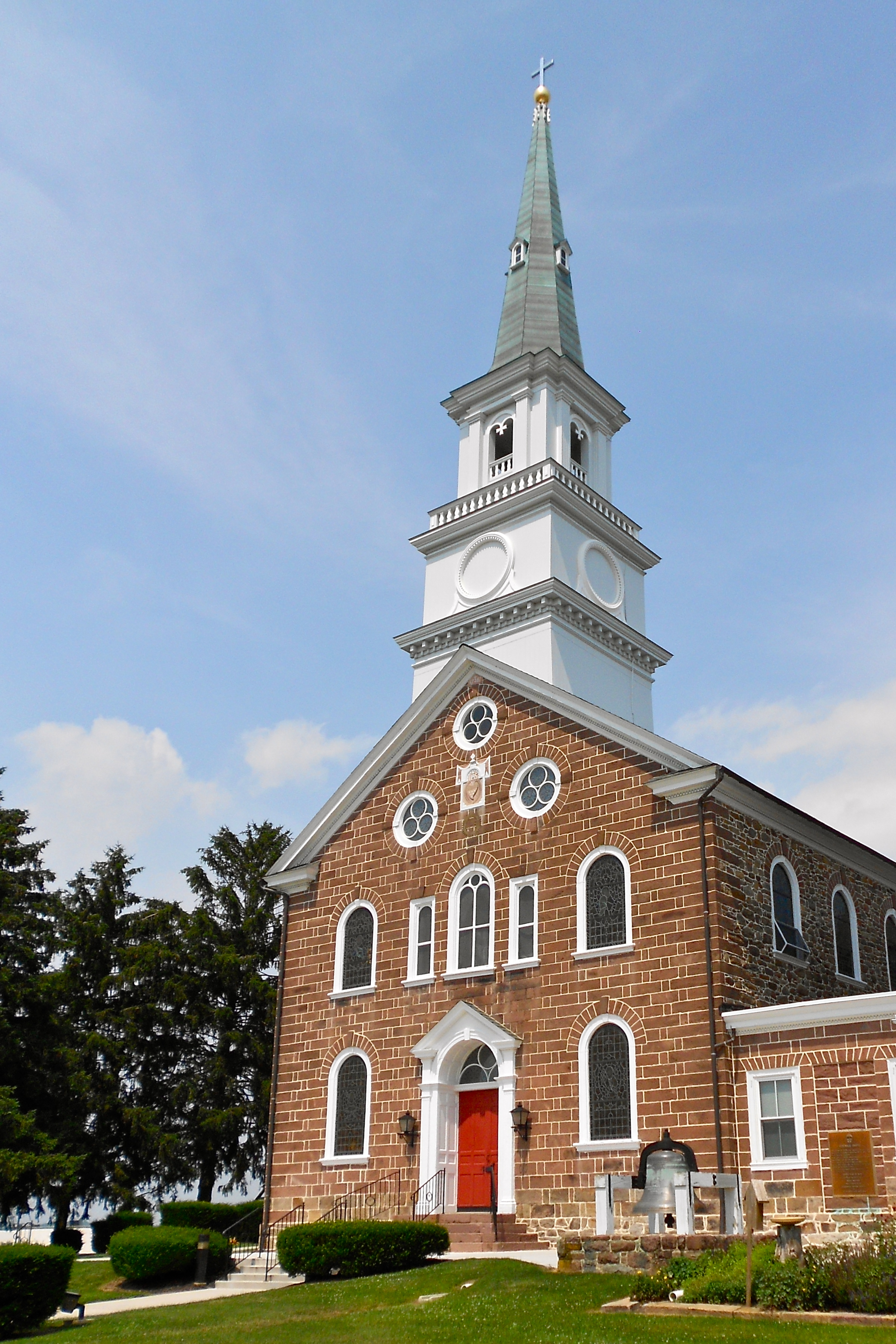

- Location within Pennsylvania Location within the United States
- Location: 3 miles (4.8 km) northwest of Hanover, Conewago Township, Pennsylvania
- Coordinates: 39°49′8″N 77°2′17″W
- Area: 1 acre (0.40 ha)
- Built: 1787
- Architectural style: Federal
- NRHP reference No.: 75001604

Significant dates
- Added to NRHP: January 29, 1975
- Designated PHMC: December 12, 1947

The Basilica of the Sacred Heart of Jesus, also known as Conewago Chapel, is a Roman Catholic minor basilica dedicated to the Sacred Heart of Jesus located in Conewago Township (Adams County), Pennsylvania, United States. The church is a part of the Roman Catholic Diocese of Harrisburg.

The Basilica was built between 1785 and 1787, and is constructed of brownstone with three-foot-thick walls. It measures 2 1/2 stories high, three bays wide and five bays deep. It features a Federal style entrance with a semi-circular arched doorway and an 80-foot-high spire, added in 1873. Attached to the chapel is a three-story rectory, also built in 1787. It is the oldest Roman Catholic church constructed of stone in the United States. Prince Gallitzin spent the first five years of his priesthood at Conewago Chapel from 1795 to 1799.

It was decreed a minor basilica on June 30, 1962. It was listed on the National Register of Historic Places in 1975.

Pastors have included Louis de Barth (1804–1812) and Burchard Villiger (1868–1869).

== Gallery ==
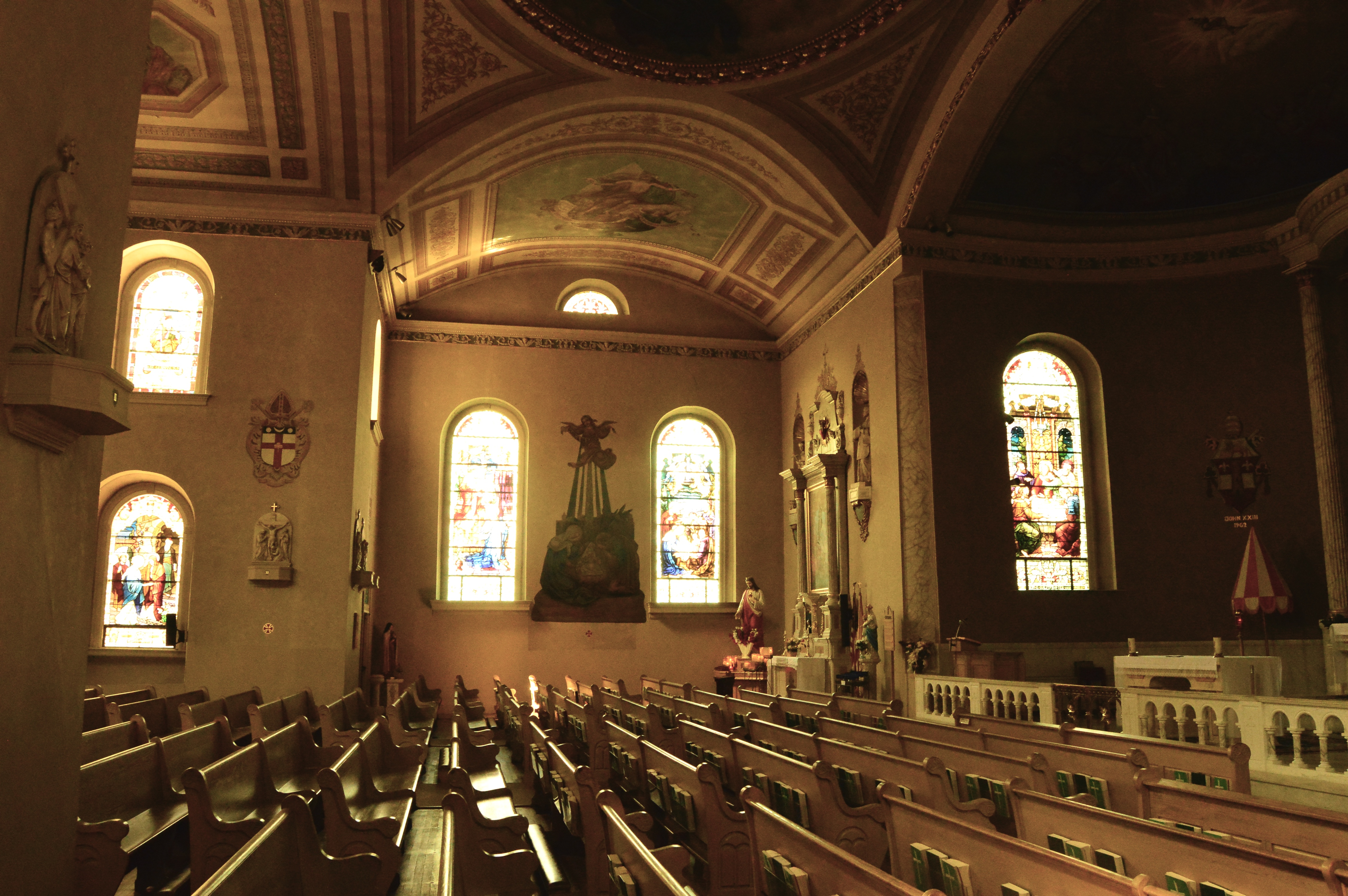
Interior of chapel

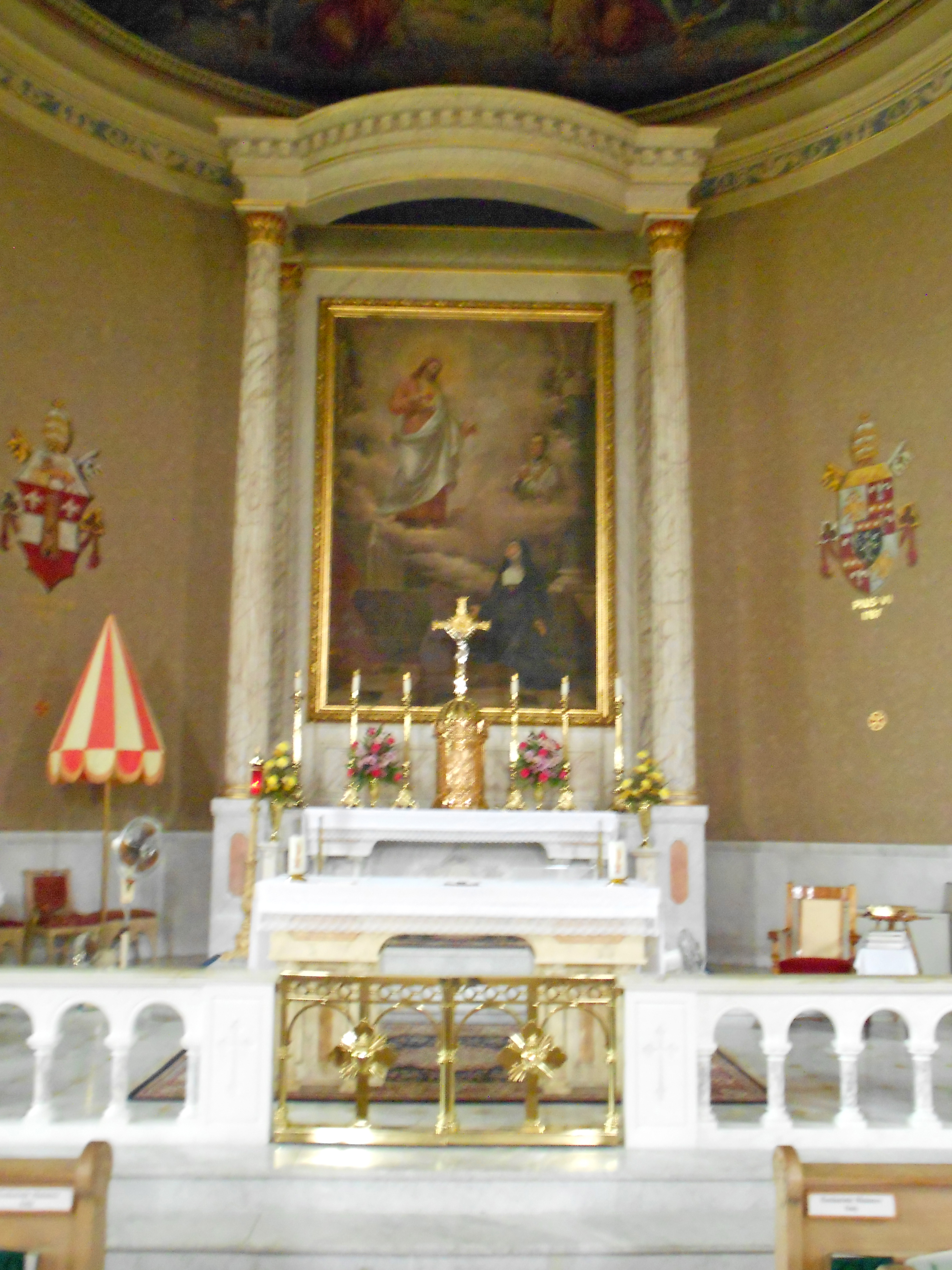
Altar

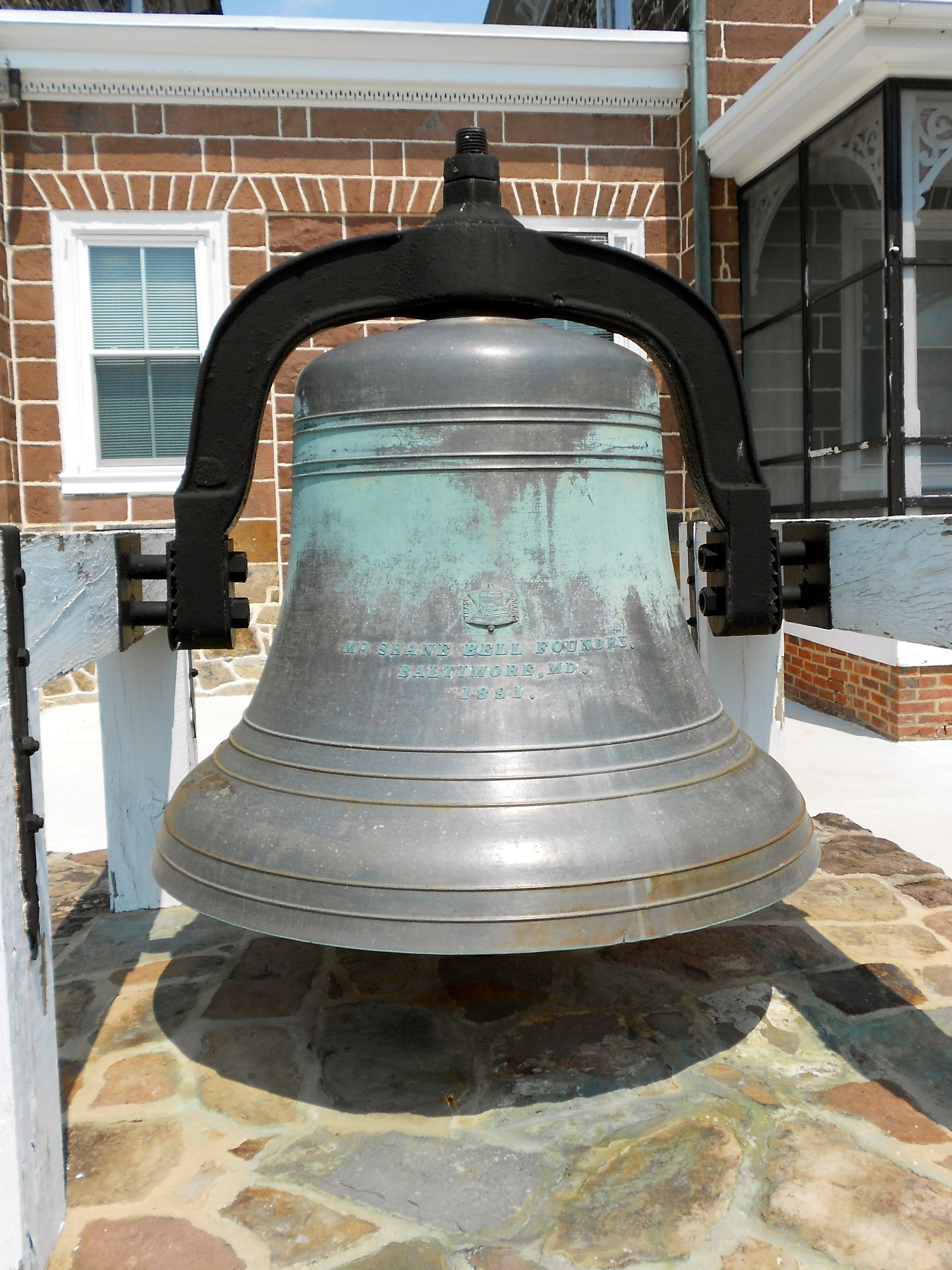
Bell

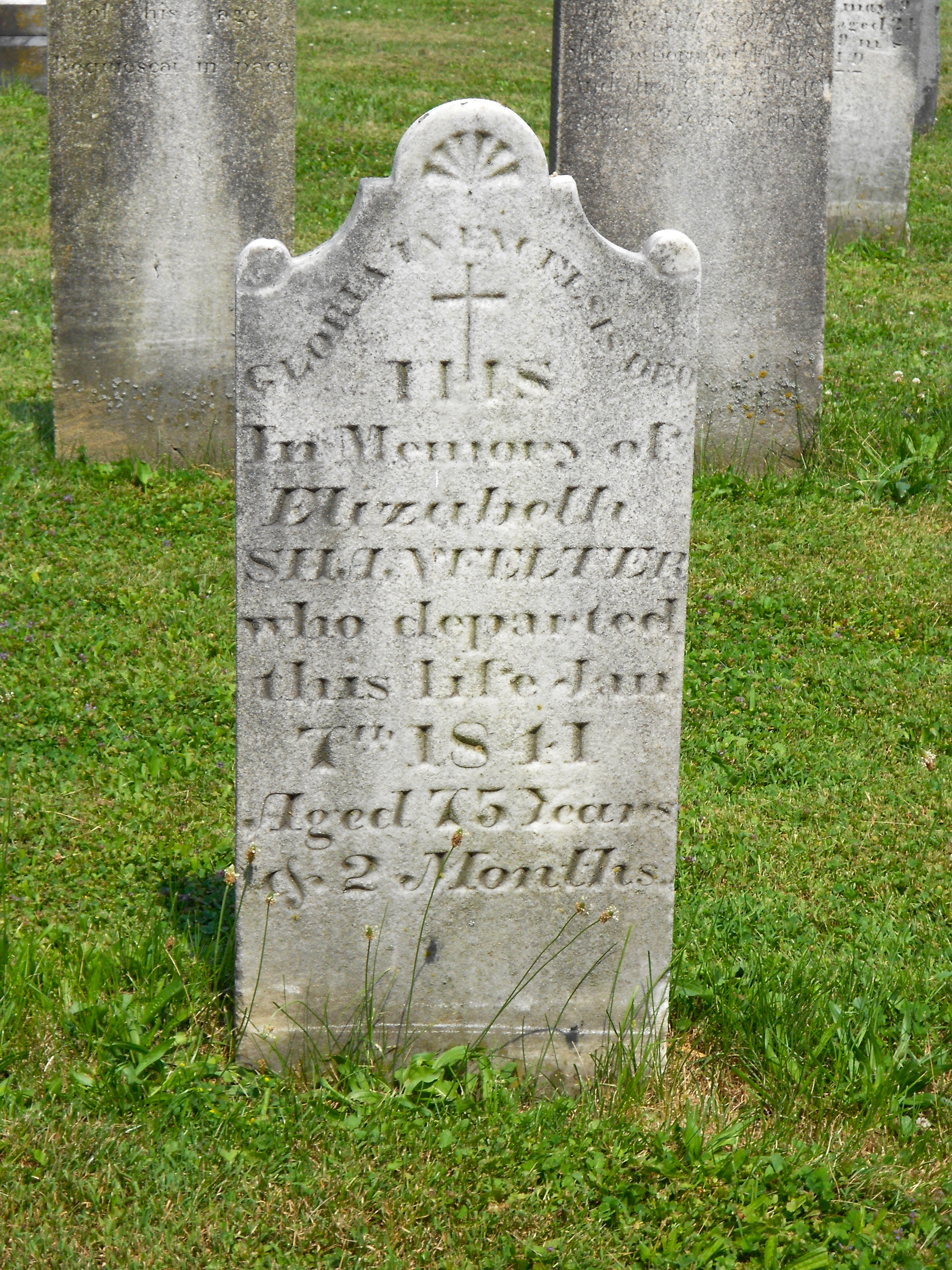
1841 gravestone
