= Sacred Heart Catholic Church (Bowie, Maryland) =

Catholic parish in Maryland, US

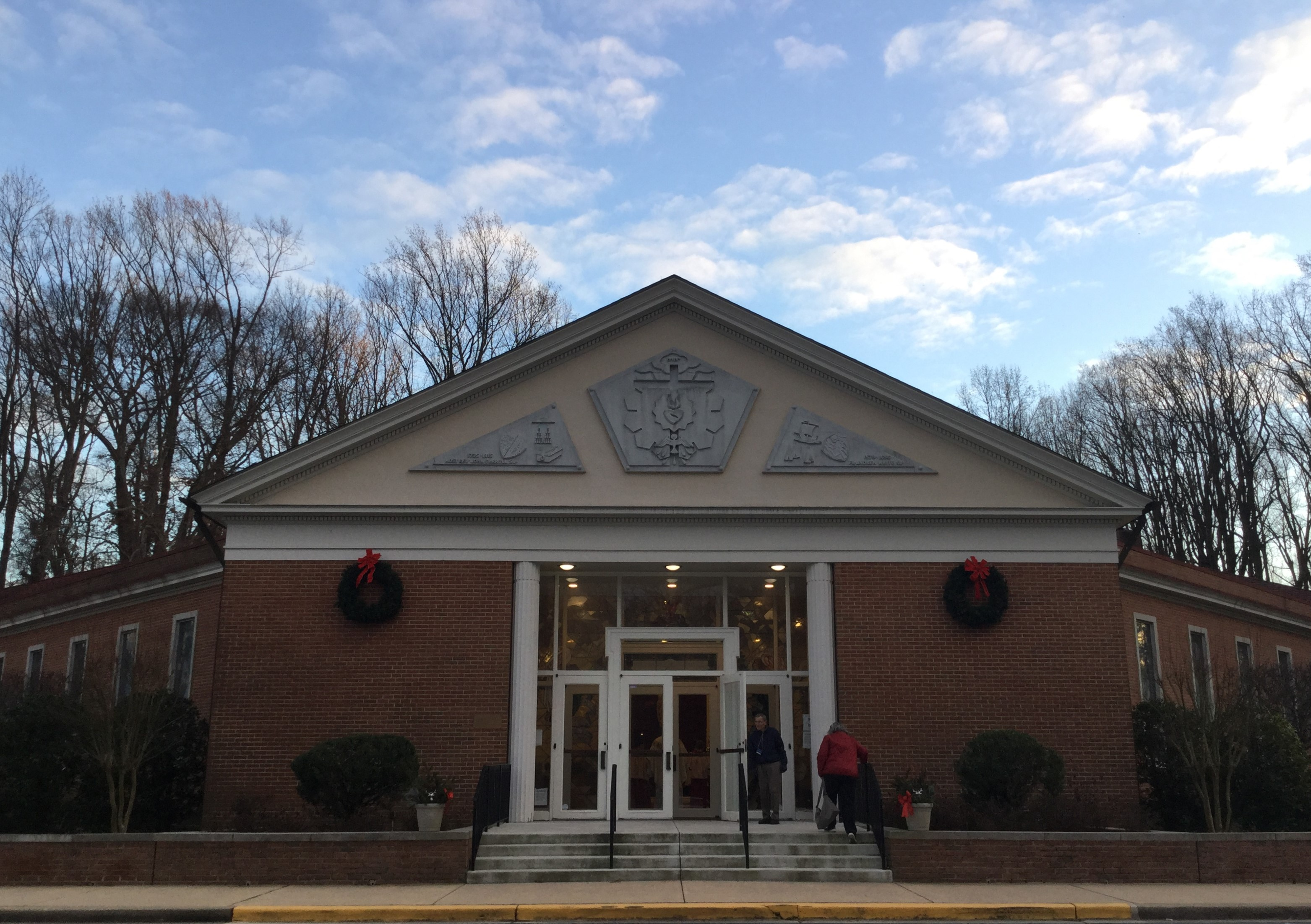
- Sacred Heart Catholic Church
- Sacred Heart Catholic Church
- 38°59′00″N 76°43′17″W
- Location: 16501 Annapolis Rd., Bowie, Maryland
- Country: United States
- Denomination: Catholic Church
- Sui iuris church: Latin Church

Administration
- Archdiocese: Washington

Sacred Heart Catholic Church in Bowie, Maryland is a Catholic church established in 1729. The church was originally built on part of the Jesuit plantation known as White Marsh Manor.

== History ==
Sacred Heart Church had been better known as White Marsh after the long stretch of sandy loam between the church and the Patuxent River and marsh. This soil contains a significant amount of mica which appears sparkling white.

Beginning with the Protestant Revolution in Maryland in 1689, Catholics were prohibited to worship publicly and the Catholic Church was not allowed to own land.

The original patent to the "White Marsh" property was granted by the authority of Lord Baltimore in 1722 to James Carroll. On February 12, 1728, Carroll bequeathed 2,000 acres (8.1 km^{2}) of White Marsh, then known as Carroll's Burgh, to the Jesuits at St. Thomas Manor in the vicinity of Port Tobacco, Maryland.

During this time, while Catholics could not worship publicly, they could do so privately and were able to build private chapels on privately held land. To facilitate the construction of a church, Carroll left the land to the individual Jesuits. That allowed them to construct the Mission of Saint Francis Borgia in 1722 on the property, which is considered the founding of Sacred Heart Church. George Thorold assumed ownership of the property in 1729 at the bequest of James Carroll. The property on which Sacred Heart Church would be built was then designated White Marsh Plantation. Jesuits lived on the plantation as private citizens and engaged in missionary work in the surrounding area.

The Jesuits did not take up permanent residence at White Marsh until about 1741, when a chapel was constructed.

=== General Chapters ===
After the American Revolution, Catholics in the newly created United States enjoyed freedom to worship. The Jesuit Fathers, led by John Carroll and five other priests, began a series of meetings at White Marsh beginning on 27 June 1783 called the General Chapters that organized the Catholic Church in the United States.

They held a second meeting 6 November 1783, and a third on 11 October 1784, at the same place, when they formulated the draft of the regulations binding all the clergy of Maryland. It was decided at these meetings every priest was maintained and given thirty pounds a year, and each priest agreed to offer ten Masses for every priest who died there. It was at this same meeting that those assembled voted John Carroll's name to be included in a petition sent to the Pope requesting Carroll's appointment to an office that ultimately resulted in Carroll becoming the first Catholic bishop in the United States. On May 18, 1789, during a meeting at White Marsh, he would be confirmed as the first American bishop.

=== The old chapel ===
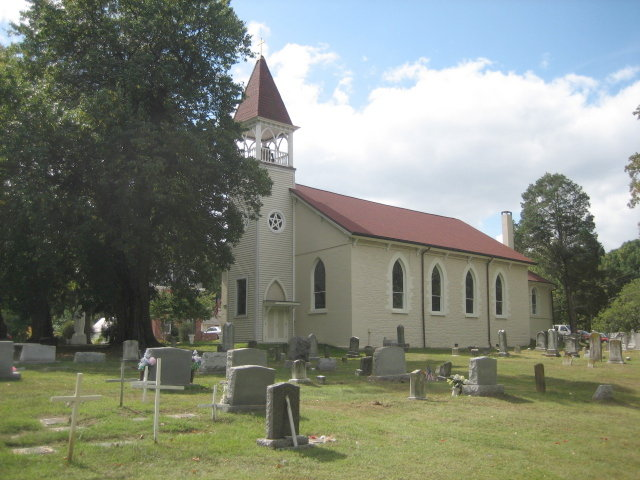
Old Sacred Heart Church 38°58′59″N 76°43′10″W

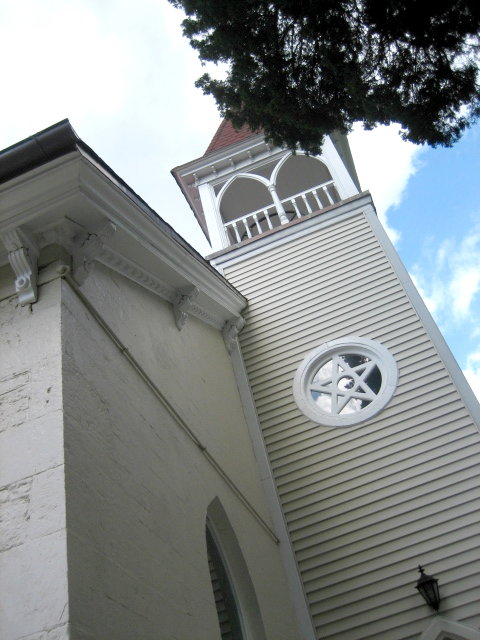
The bell tower was added in 1876

The old chapel is the only Catholic church built before the American Revolution in Prince George's County.

The current chapel building was built on the hill circa 1827 at the east end of the original chapel and is constructed of undressed stone, with a gable roof. In 1853, a fire destroyed the interior of the building but left the stone walls standing. The interior was rebuilt by 1855. In 1876 a wood-frame bell tower was added to the church at the east end of the gable.

=== Slaves at White Marsh ===
The earliest known slaves at the White Marsh were those owned by Reverend John Lewis. John Ashton also brought enslaved persons to operate the plantation as well. Lewis's slaves included "at the Lower Quarters: Nanny, Kate and her child, Fanny born 1762, and Samuel 1764, Ruth, Terry, Regis, (Sampson, Jenny), Frank and children, Lucy, Davi, Nancy, Paul, and Henrietta born May 1763."

Between 1823 and 1829, more than 16 enslaved people were forced from their families at White Marsh to build foundations for Jesuit institutions in Missouri, including what would become Saint Louis University.

In 1838, the Jesuits sold 272 slaves to Henry Johnson and Jesse Batey, including nearly a dozen slaves from White Marsh to fund the construction of Georgetown University. Among those sold was a 65-year old grandfather named Isaac. Father Thomas Lilly wrote in a letter to Rome describing the sale of these slaves, "“Without any notice or preparation the slaves were seized violently and by heathen hands. They were treated as animals in every respect.”

Adjoining the chapel is a large cemetery with gravestones dating from 1830.

Elm Street Development obtained a contract in 2016 to purchase 154 acres of land surrounding the chapel from the Jesuits, who had owned the property since the 1728 land grant of Carroll's Burgh from John Carroll. The developer sought to change zoning on the parcel and construct 440 single-family homes, but faced local opposition.

In 2023, graves were discovered on the property that are believed to contain the remains of enslaved persons from the 18th and 19th centuries.

=== New church ===
A much larger brick church was built at the foot of the hill fronting Maryland Route 450 and dedicated in 1969. The newer church was built to accommodate the growth of the Catholic population of Bowie with the construction of the Levitt and Sons development, "Belair at Bowie", where most of its congregants live.

== See also ==
- List of Jesuit sites
