= David Hillhouse Buel (priest) =

American Catholic priest and Episcopal priest

The Reverend David Hillhouse Buel
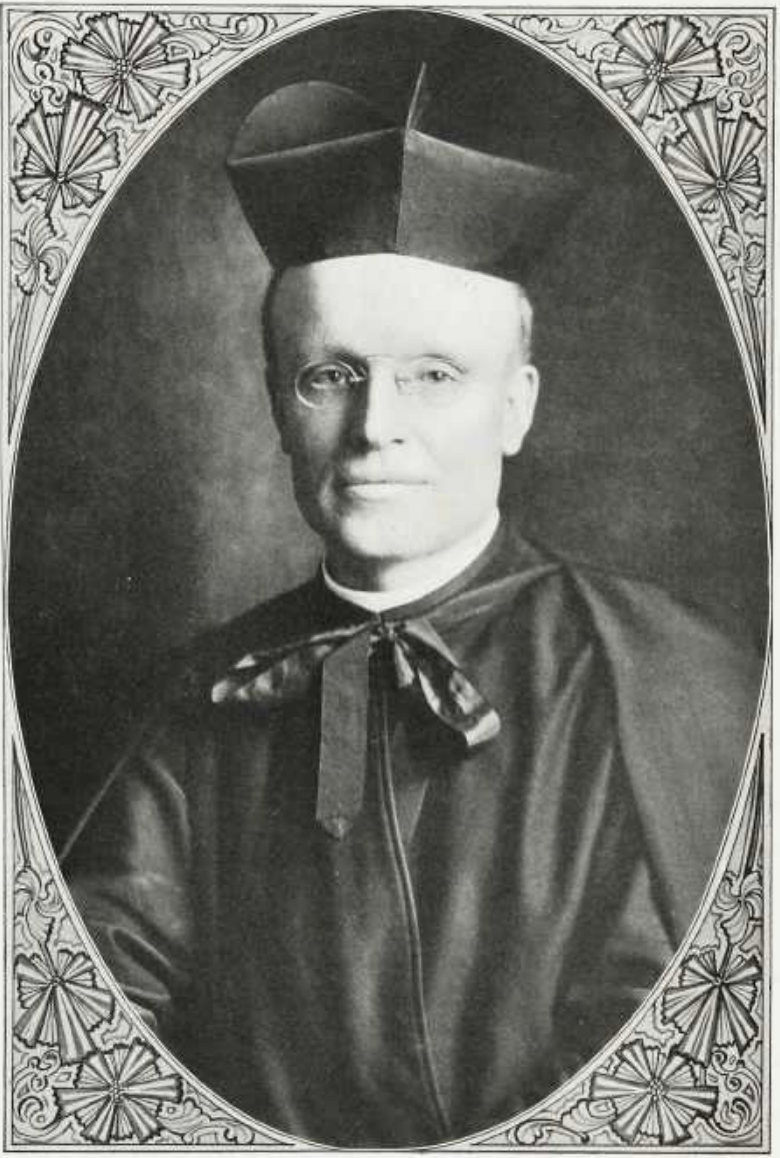
- David Hillhouse Buel in 1908

34th President of Georgetown University
- In office 1905–1908
- Preceded by: Jerome Daugherty
- Succeeded by: Joseph J. Himmel

Personal details
- Born: July 19, 1862 Watervliet Arsenal, West Troy, New York, U.S. (Note: Watervliet, New York, then known as West Troy, is located across the Hudson River from the city of Troy, New York.)
- Died: May 23, 1923 (aged 60) New York City, U.S.
- Resting place: Oakwood Cemetery
- Spouse: Katherine Frances Powers (m. 1912)
- Relations: Charles McDougall (grandfather)
- Parent: David Hillhouse Buel (father)
- Education: Williston Seminary
- Alma mater: Yale University (BA); Woodstock College

David Hillhouse Buel Jr. (July 19, 1862 – May 23, 1923) was an American priest who served as the president of Georgetown University. A Catholic priest and Jesuit for much of his life, he later left the Jesuit order to marry, and subsequently left the Catholic Church to become an Episcopal priest. Born at Watervliet, New York, he was the son of David Hillhouse Buel, a distinguished Union Army officer, and descended from numerous prominent New England families. While studying at Yale University, he formed an acquaintance with priest Michael J. McGivney, resulting in his conversion to Catholicism and joining the Society of Jesus after graduation.

In 1901, Buel became a professor at Georgetown University. He took charge of the university in 1905, after the sudden removal of the president. In this role, he promoted intramural sports, oversaw construction of Ryan Gymnasium, and reformed the curriculum and university governance. He also instituted strict discipline and curtailed intercollegiate athletics, stoking fierce opposition from the student body and their parents, which resulted in his removal by the Jesuit superiors in 1908. Buel then performed pastoral work and taught for several years, before resigning from the Jesuit order in 1912 and secretly marrying in Connecticut. When word reached Washington, D.C., his former Jesuit colleagues publicly condemned him, and the media claimed his actions resulted in his excommunication latae sententiae.

Buel resumed teaching in a secular capacity in New England, but after his marriage, he lived at times in poverty despite his wife's considerable inheritance. He formally left the Catholic Church in 1922 to be ordained an Episcopal priest, but never took up rectorship of a church. He spent his last years in New York City.

== Early life ==
David Hillhouse Buel was born on July 19, 1862, at Watervliet Arsenal in West Troy, New York. His father, David Hillhouse Buel, was a graduate of the United States Military Academy, and distinguished Union Army officer. He rose to the rank of lieutenant colonel during the Civil War, and was appointed Chief of Ordnance of the Army of the Tennessee. He had been awarded a brevet while a major. Buel's mother was Josephine Maria Buel née McDougall. She was of Scottish ancestry, and the daughter of Brigadier General Charles McDougall. Buel's grandfather was a Congregational minister and an 1833 graduate of Williams College.

Buel's ancestry includes several prominent and influential families, such as the McDougalls, Hansons, Wilmers and Hillhouses, the latter of which produced many statesmen and scholars in Connecticut. The Buel family was also prominent in Connecticut, and was one of the oldest in New England. His earliest American ancestor, William Buel, arrived in 1630 from England. Two of Buel's brothers, Samuel and Clarence, went on to become Episcopal priests.

=== Education and conversion to Catholicism ===
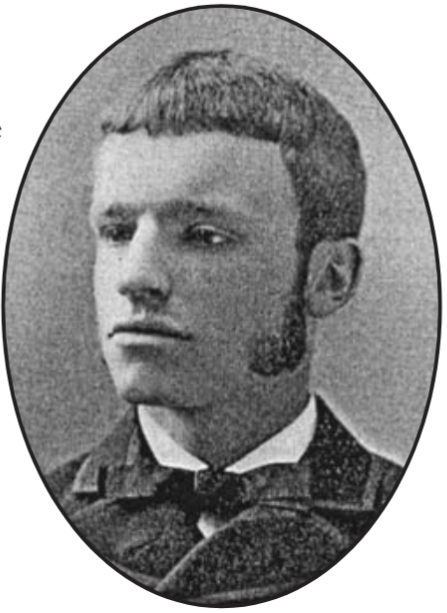
Buel as a student at Yale in 1883

Buel attended Williston Seminary in Easthampton, Massachusetts, where he graduated in 1879. From there, he went to Yale University, where he became known by his nickname of Ted. Many of Buel's ancestors attended Yale, including his great-great-great-uncle, James Hillhouse, a 1773 graduate who became the treasurer of the university for 50 years, and the president pro tempore of the United States Senate. At Yale, Buel became interested in theater. He lived with his uncle, William Hillhouse, next door to St. Mary's Church. Along with other Protestant students, Buel began attending Catholic Mass at St. Mary's after the Protestant chapel services at which Yale required attendance of all students. The neighboring Protestants were not happy with Protestant students attending the Catholic church. At St. Mary's, he became friendly with Michael J. McGivney, a Catholic priest. Upon McGivney's suggestion, Buel focused his theatrical interests on the classics, rather than what McGivney viewed as unseemly subjects, such as the minstrel shows that were popular with the students of Yale at the time. Heeding the advice, he wrote Medea: A Travesty, based on the Greek tragedy of Medea, and a musical titled Penikeese; or Cuisine and Cupid. Filled with local jokes, Penikeese became so popular with the students that the musical was staged professionally in New Haven, garnering Buel much attention. His theatrical interest remained with him later in life, and he continued to write operettas.

During his sophomore year, Buel's mother converted to Catholicism. This prompted him to give up his Episcopal faith and convert to Catholicism shortly thereafter, largely guided by McGivney. Two of Buel's Protestant classmates were also guided by McGivney, and converted to Catholicism. In 1883, he graduated from Yale with honors, receiving a Bachelor of Arts. He then notified McGivney that he desired to become a priest. Wary that Buel may have arrived at the decision hastily, McGivney instructed him to allow time for reflection before he reached a final decision. Buel arranged to spend the summer traveling in Canada, where he upheld his decision.

=== Teaching and formation ===
Buel entered the Society of Jesus upon his return from Canada and in November 1883 proceeded to the novitiate at West Park, New York, where he remained for a year. While there, he became ill and was sent to St. Francis Xavier College in New York City, where he was given light work as the assistant prefect of discipline. In December 1885, he left the college and took up a professorship of Latin and Ancient Greek at the College of the Holy Cross in Worcester, Massachusetts. Buel then studied the classics for a year at the Jesuit novitiate in Frederick, Maryland, before going to Woodstock College for his three years of philosophical studies. In 1890, he returned to New York to become a professor of mechanics, calculus, and physics at Fordham University. The following year, he again joined the faculty of St. Francis Xavier College as a professor of Latin, mathematics, and mechanics, where he remained for four years.

In 1895, Buel resumed his priestly studies at Woodstock, taking up four years of theology. On June 28, 1898, Buel was ordained a priest by Cardinal James Gibbons at the college. Following his ordination, he became a member of the missionary band of the Jesuits' Maryland-New York Province in March 1899. In this position, he was stationed at churches throughout New England, New York, and Pennsylvania, and led retreats for religious orders until September 1900. He spent his tertianship year in Florissant, Missouri, studying ascetical theology.

Buel then moved to Georgetown University in Washington, D.C. to serve as a professor of mechanics and physics from 1901 to 1904. He attained the grade of professed father in the Society of Jesus on February 3, 1902, being promoted to Doctor of Divinity. In 1905, he became father minister (vice president) of the university.

== Georgetown University ==
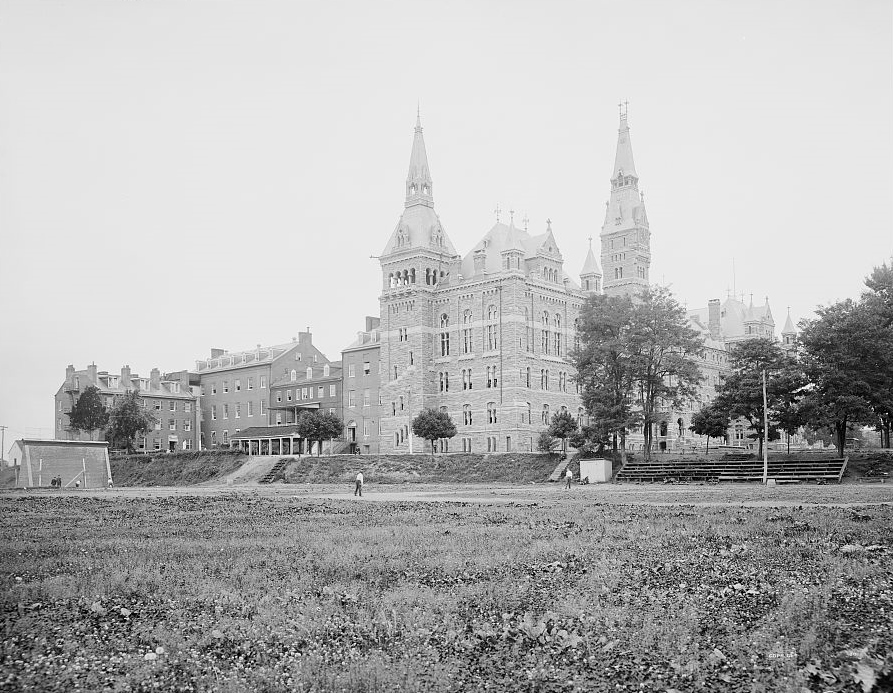
Southern view of the Georgetown University campus c. 1904

After Jerome Daugherty fell ill, Buel succeeded him in 1905 as president of Georgetown University. During his tenure, Buel convened the first alumni advisory committee, who solicited input from alumni in the governance of the university, a rarity for contemporary Jesuit universities, but a common institution at many public and an increasing number of private universities. He was also successful in reducing the university's debt.

Buel also saw that the curriculum was generally improved, including increasing the size of the faculty at the Law School. During his presidency, the School of Medicine's curriculum was adopted as the standard of the Association of American Medical Colleges. He also affirmed the semi-autonomy the Sisters of St. Francis had from the medical faculty in running the Georgetown University Hospital and School of Nursing.

=== Reform of athletics ===
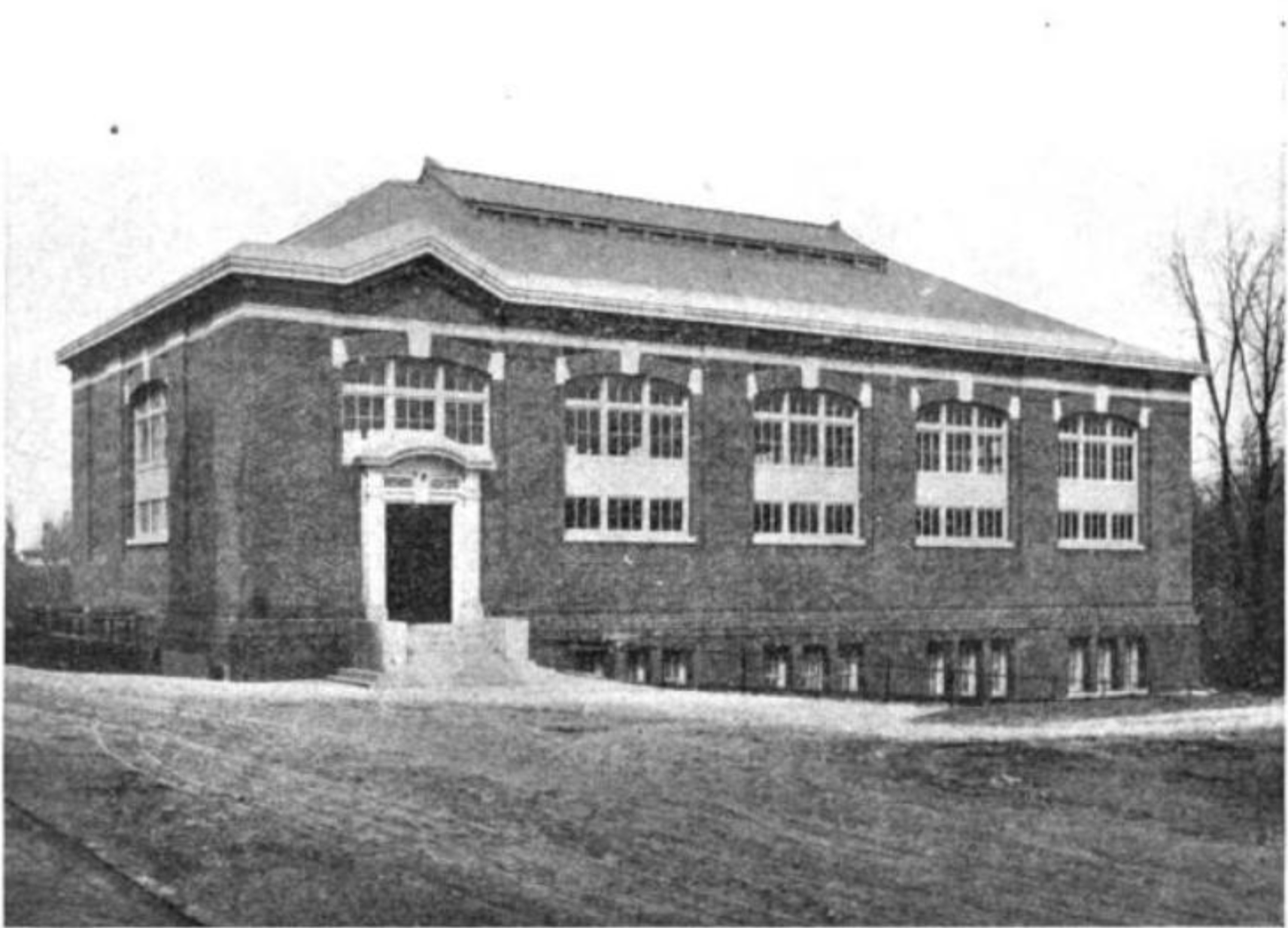
Buel oversaw construction of Ryan Gymnasium in 1905.

Continuing the work of his predecessor, Buel reduced the prominence of athletics by de-professionalizing the football, baseball, and track programs, which involved strict limits on intercollegiate travel for athletics. He also considered abolishing the football team altogether, as Columbia University, New York University, and Stanford University had already done, due to a spate of severe injuries and deaths in college football. Nonetheless, students were generally unhappy with the reform.

Though he disfavored intercollegiate athletics, Buel strongly believed in fitness, and promoted intramural sports. He reasoned that athletics should promote the physical fitness of all students, and should not single out a few talented athletes. To this end, he oversaw construction of the Ryan Gymnasium in 1905, for which one of his predecessors, J. Havens Richards, had raised money, and hired the first physical education instructor in 1906.

=== Discipline ===
Buel's presidency was characterized by the institution of rigid discipline. One of his measures included putting into place a strict daily schedule by which students were required to abide. As well as classes, students were obligated to attend study hall, meals, Mass, night prayers, and benediction. Failure to abide by this agenda resulted in punishment according to a new demerit system. Despite his general draconian disposition, Buel protested to the Jesuit Superior General that his requirement that students not be allowed off-campus past 10:00 p.m. was an excessive restriction of students' liberty that would dissuade them from attending the university.

His rigidity was met with strong opposition by the students, their parents, and faculty. Buel made no allowances for absence from these requirements, even at the request of parents to allow their sons to attend family events, St. Patrick's Day celebrations, or, in one case, to attend the Democratic Party state convention nominating a student's father for Congress. According to his disciplinary system, transgression of his decision to compel attendance resulted in expulsion from the university of a student who had left to act as godfather at the baptism of his sister's child.

Students began protesting these strictures, such as by marching out of campus en masse. Eventually, this began to affect enrollment; several students withdrew, and few matriculated. In 1908, the provincial superior wrote to Rome that Buel had provoked an "armed neutrality" between himself and the students, and a replacement must be appointed to save Georgetown from "certain impending ruin". Determining that Buel fulfilling another three-year term would result in permanent harm to the university, the provincial sent a slate of three nominees to the Superior General, who selected Joseph J. Himmel in August 1908 to replace Buel. Such a sudden departure was unusual, as presidents usually completed their tenure at the end of an academic year, rather than soon before the start of a new one.

== Later life ==
=== Parochial work and teaching ===
Following his abrupt departure from Georgetown, Buel was sent to Philadelphia, where he was made rector of St. Joseph's Church. He became a member of the Military Order of the Loyal Legion of the United States, and served as chaplain to its District of Columbia Commandery from 1908 to 1909; he resigned from the order in October 1911. He also became a member of the National Geographic Society.

In 1909, he once again returned to the College of the Holy Cross as a professor of mechanics and physics, but suffered an injury to his ankle, and was unable to assume the position. Therefore, in November of that year, he went to New York City as an assistant parish priest at St. Francis Xavier Church. In February 1910, he was transferred to St. Thomas Manor in Maryland, and became rector of St. Ignatius Church there. Finally, he returned to Washington, D.C., where he worked as a parish priest at St. Aloysius Church and taught at Gonzaga College. While at Gonzaga, he officially resigned from the Society of Jesus on July 12, 1912.

=== Laity and marriage ===
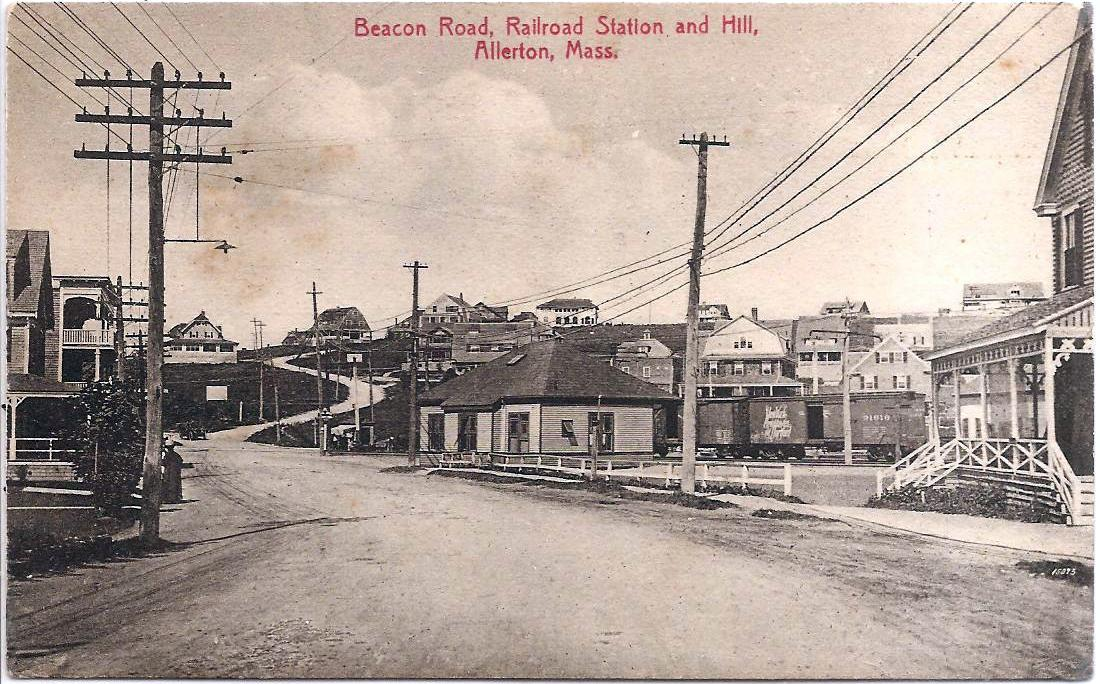
Center of Point Allerton, Massachusetts, the summer resort town where Buel and Powers met

On December 30, 1912, Buel secretly married Katherine Frances Powers in New Canaan, Connecticut, to the surprise of even Powers' parents. Powers was the daughter of Edward J. Powers, a contracting mason, of whom she was one of eight daughters. She reportedly had been left an inheritance valued at more than $10,000. Her mother, Mary Powers, née Conway, was a devout Catholic and raised her children as such; one daughter became a nun. Buel and Powers met at a summer resort in Point Allterton, Massachusetts, in 1912, and began a secret courtship. Following their marriage, they moved to Kip's Bay in Manhattan. Their marriage did not produce any children.

Meanwhile, the Jesuits at Georgetown were shocked to learn of his marriage through the news, and several senior Jesuits condemned it as inviting criticism of the university by those seeking salacious stories. It was reported in the media that Buel's marriage, which was a violation of his vow of celibacy, automatically severed him from the priesthood and excommunicated him latae sententiae from the Catholic Church. Buel responded to the criticism by writing an open letter to the United Press, saying he was not a Jesuit at the time of his marriage, having previously tendered his resignation to the Society of Jesus as a member in good standing. He argued that the Jesuits' public criticism of his marriage was a personally motivated departure from their usual policy of secrecy, and cited several former Jesuits who withdrew from the order and received no public condemnation.

=== Conversion to Episcopalianism ===
Soon after marrying, Buel moved to Massachusetts, where he taught Latin, Greek, and French at Roxbury Preparatory School from 1913 to 1914. He then opened a summer camp for boys in Allerton Heights, Massachusetts, called Camp Hillhouse-by-the-Sea. From 1915 to 1918, he tutored students at the camp. After leaving the Society of Jesus, Buel at times lived in poverty, so much so that at one point he almost starved. When visited one winter by the Unitarian minister William Laurence Sullivan, he said he was prepared to take any kind of work, including being a guard in the subway.

Buel sought admittance to the priesthood of the Episcopal Church, of which he had been a member before converting to Catholicism in college. On June 2, 1922, he was ordained at St. Thomas's Church in New Haven by Bishop Chauncey B. Brewster of the Episcopal Diocese of Connecticut. Buel then became ill, and was unable to accept a rectorship of an Episcopal church.

For part of 1922, he lived in Bridgeport, Connecticut, before returning to New York City that November, where he lived out the rest of his life. Eventually, he became ill, and one of the local Catholic priests visited him at his bedside the day before his death to offer him last rites and hear his confession; Buel, who could no longer speak, refused both. He died of pneumonia on May 23, 1923, and was buried in Oakwood Cemetery in Troy, New York.

== See also ==
- Oliver Prince Buel

== Notes ==
Academic offices
Preceded by Jerome Daugherty	34th President of Georgetown University; 1905–1908	Succeeded by Joseph J. Himmel
