= James Doonan =

James Doonan may refer to:

- James A. Doonan (1841–1911), American Jesuit priest
- James Doonan (trade unionist) (1868–1932), Scottish trade unionist

== See also ==
- Doonan (disambiguation), surname and placename page
