= Doonan =

Doonan may refer to:

== Places ==
- Doonan, County Antrim, a townland in Tickmacrevan, County Antrim, Northern Ireland
- Doonan, County Fermanagh, a townland in Derryvullan, County Fermanagh, County Tyrone
- Doonan, Queensland, a suburb on the Sunshine Coast in Queensland, Australia

== People ==
- James Doonan (disambiguation)
