= David Hillhouse Buel (soldier) =

Union Army officer

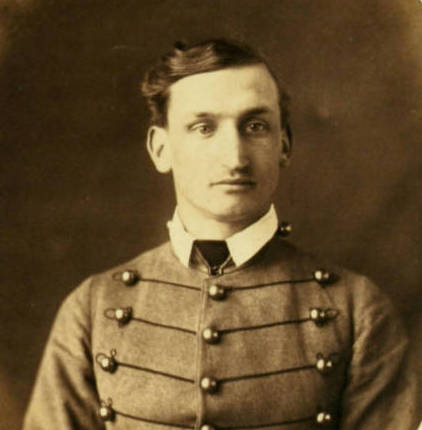
- David Hillhouse Buel in 1861
- Born: September 19, 1839; Marshall, Michigan, U.S.
- Died: July 22, 1870 (aged 30) Fort Leavenworth, Kansas, U.S.
- Buried: Fort Leavenworth National Cemetery
- Branch: United States Army: Union Army
- Service years: 1861–1870
- Rank: Captain; Brevet Lieutenant Colonel
- Conflicts: American Civil War: First Battle of Bull Run; Atlanta campaign; Sherman's March to the Sea; Carolinas campaign
- Education: United States Military Academy
- Children: David Hillhouse Buel

David Hillhouse Buel (September 19, 1839 – July 22, 1870) was a United States Army officer who rose to the rank of brevet major and lieutenant colonel in the Union Army during the American Civil War. Born in Michigan, he attended the United States Military Academy, and eventually became Chief of Ordnance of the Army of the Tennessee and fought in the First Battle of Bull Run. He was killed by a soldier at Fort Leavenworth, whom he had imprisoned for desertion.

== Early life ==
David Hillhouse Buel was born on September 19, 1839, in Marshall, Michigan, to Samuel Buel and Jane Buel née Wilmer. He enrolled as a cadet at the United States Military Academy in West Point, New York, on September 1, 1857, graduating on June 24, 1861.

He married Josephine Maria McDougal on September 28, 1861, in Poughkeepsie, New York. His father presided over the marriage ceremony. McDougal was born on June 16, 1839, in Indianapolis, Indiana, and was the daughter of Brigadier General Charles McDougall, a surgeon in the Army. Buel had two children. His daughter, Josephine Maria Buel, was born on February 13, 1866; she later changed her name to Violet McDougal. His son, David Hillhouse Buel, was born on June 19, 1862, and became a Jesuit priest and the president of Georgetown University, before converting and becoming an Episcopal minister.

== Military career ==
Buel served in the Union Army during the Civil War. He was appointed the commanding officer of the Kennebec Arsenal in Augusta, Maine, before becoming the commanding officer of the Leavenworth Arsenal at Fort Leavenworth in Kansas. He became Chief of Ordnance of the Army of the Tennessee. He was a brevetted major and later lieutenant colonel in the Ordnance Corps.

On July 22, 1870, Buel attended a party at the house of Brigadier General Samuel D. Sturgis. While exiting his carriage in which he was returned from the party, he was shot and killed by a soldier, whom he had imprisoned in the guardhouse for desertion. His widow married Buel's uncle, Oliver Prince Buel, on December 1, 1875, at Jefferson Barracks in Missouri.

== See also ==
- Oliver Prince Buel
