= Jerome Daugherty =

American Jesuit educator

The Reverend Jerome Daugherty SJ
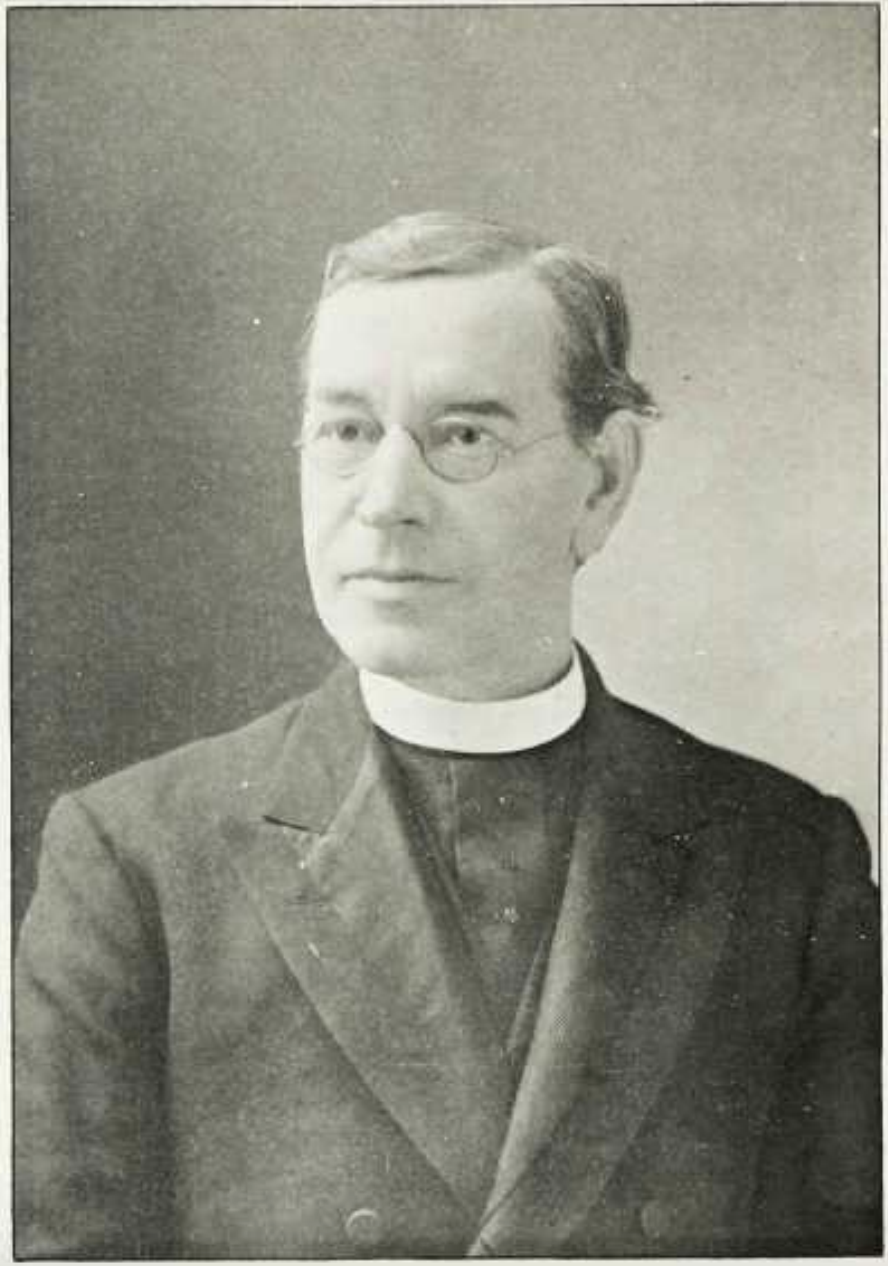
- Jerome Daugherty in 1904

33rd President of Georgetown University
- In office 1901–1905
- Preceded by: John D. Whitney
- Succeeded by: David Hillhouse Buel

Personal details
- Born: March 25, 1849 Baltimore, Maryland, U.S.
- Died: May 24, 1914 (aged 65) New York City, U.S.
- Education: Loyola College in Maryland; Woodstock College

Orders
- Ordination: June 1880 by James Gibbons

Jerome Daugherty SJ (March 25, 1849 – May 24, 1914) was an American Catholic priest and Jesuit who served in many different capacities at Jesuit institutions throughout the northeast United States, eventually becoming president of Georgetown University in 1901. Born in Baltimore, he was educated at Loyola College in Maryland, before entering the Society of Jesus and becoming a member of the first class at Woodstock College. He then taught various subjects, including mathematics, Latin, Ancient Greek, rhetoric, and the humanities in Massachusetts, New York City, and Washington, D.C., and served as minister at many of the institutions there.

During his four-year leadership of Georgetown University, he oversaw several construction projects, the largest of which were the demolition of Old South Hall and its replacement with Ida Ryan Hall, and the construction of Hirst Library inside Healy Hall. He also continued his predecessor's work of reforming the curriculum, and managing tensions with the Catholic University of America. After his resignation, he continued his ministry in Maryland, Washington, and Philadelphia, before returning to New York, where he died.

== Early life ==
Jerome Daugherty was born on March 25, 1849, in Baltimore, Maryland, to Jerome M. Daugherty, a printer, and Rose A. Wivel. His ancestry was of German and Irish origin. Beginning in 1858, he attended the parochial school of St. Vincent de Paul Church. In 1863, he enrolled in the preparatory department of Loyola College in Maryland, where he studied for two years. He then entered the Society of Jesus, and was sent to the Jesuit novitiate in Frederick, Maryland, in August 1865. There, he was the spiritual reader to the Jesuit brothers. He remained in Frederick until 1869, before completing his higher studies at Woodstock College. A member of the first class at Woodstock, he studied philosophy for three years.

In 1872, Daugherty was sent to Georgetown University in Washington, D.C., to teach mathematics. After two years, he was transferred to Boston College, where he continued teaching, now Latin and Ancient Greek. He then resumed his education at Woodstock College in 1877, taking up the study of theology under Camillo Mazzella, a future cardinal. In June 1880, he was ordained a priest by Cardinal James Gibbons. He was again sent out to various Jesuit institutions, spending a year at St. Francis Xavier College in New York City and another year at Boston College, where he was made prefect of studies and put in charge of the spiritual care of the municipal hospital. He then began the tertianship of his Jesuit formation.

== Jesuit ministry ==
Daugherty was again sent to Loyola College in 1884, where he was prefect of studies and taught rhetoric, humanities, and mathematics. The following year, he became minister and vice president at Gonzaga College, where he was well-liked and remained for four years. He was then transferred to Georgetown, where he remained a minister for seven years. In 1895, he went continued his ministry at Woodstock College, and took up the additional positions of professor of mathematics and treasurer. The following year, he was sent to the College of the Holy Cross in Worcester, Massachusetts, as minister. In January 1901, he returned to New York, where he was appointed socius, or advisor to the Jesuit provincial superior. However, he remained in this position for only a few months, before being appointed president of Georgetown University.

=== Georgetown University ===
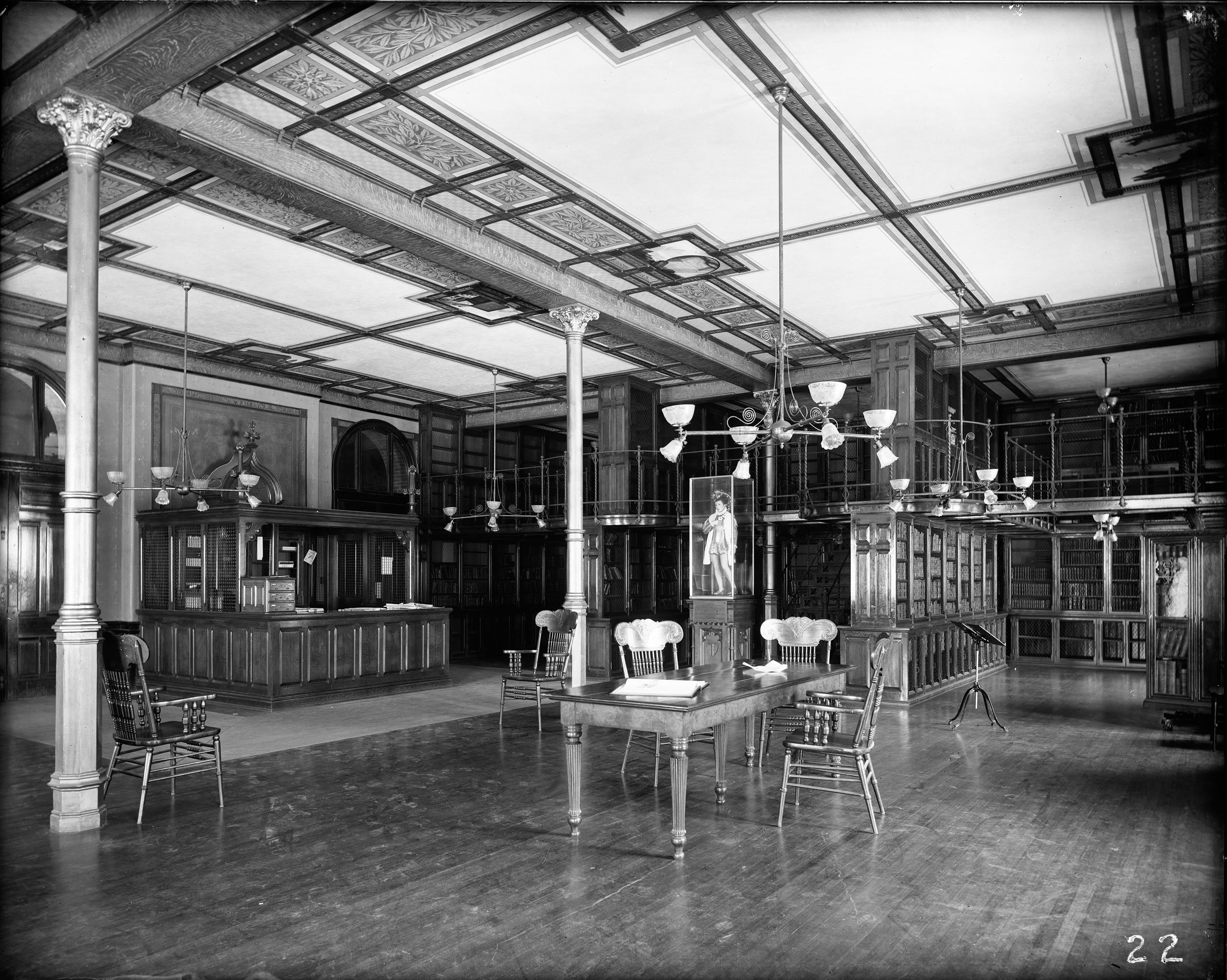
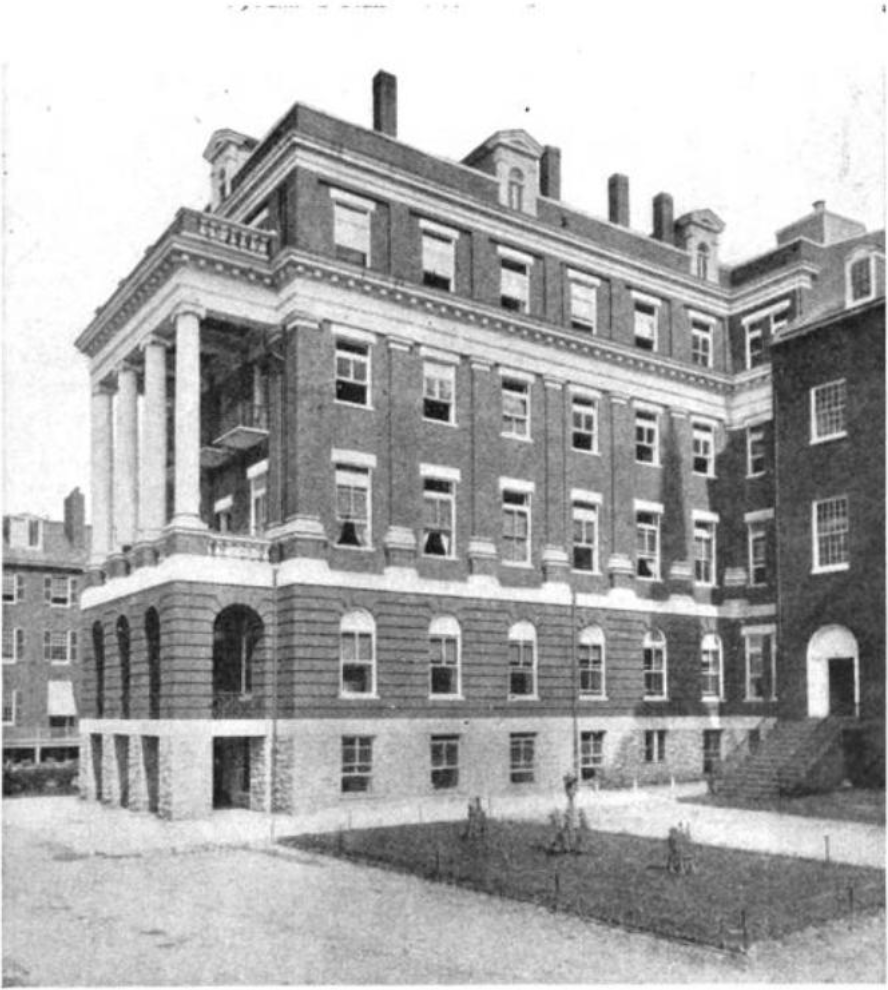
Hirst Library inside Healy Hall (left) and Ida Ryan Hall (right) shortly after opening

Succeeding John D. Whitney, Daugherty took office on July 11, 1901. During his presidency, he undertook several building campaigns. He oversaw the start of construction on Ryan Gymnasium, and as well as the erection of Ida Ryan Hall, which required being built in the place of the demolished Old South Hall (the oldest building on campus). He also saw that a new wing of the Georgetown University Hospital was built, as well as Kober operating amphitheater, and the Hirst Library, which was dedicated on December 18, 1902.

In addition to physical improvements, he continued the work of his predecessor in instituting a curricular reform. This included adding a fourth year to the course of study at the Law School, beginning lectures in ethics at the School of Medicine, and presiding over the establishment of the antecedents of the School of Dentistry, which was then a department of the School of Medicine. There had long been tension between Georgetown and the Catholic University of America, which opened in Washington, D.C., in 1887. During Daugherty's tenure, the president of Catholic University complained to the Jesuit provincial superior that Georgetown's graduate programs were detracting from those of Catholic University. As a result, the provincial ordered Daugherty in 1903 to revise the graduate curriculum; otherwise, the Graduate School would be closed down. Daugherty complied, but the Jesuit Superior General later pressured the university to merge the Graduate School into the College in 1907.

In July 1905, amid allegations that Georgetown's athletics teams were using professional athletes, rather than bona fide students, Daugherty terminated all university funding of sports, including athletic scholarships. Later that year, Daugherty's health began to deteriorate, and in August 1905, he resigned the presidency, and was succeeded by David Hillhouse Buel. Overall, he was one of the most well-liked presidents of the university in that era.

== Later years ==
After leaving Georgetown, he was sent to Fordham University as spiritual father, where his health recovered and he again took up teaching. He then returned to Woodstock College, where he was spiritual father to the scholastics there for four years. He was then stationed for a short time at Holy Trinity Church in Georgetown, where he took care of the ill and children. Finally, he was sent to the Church of the Gesú in Philadelphia as operarius (visiting priest), (Note: An operarius is a Jesuit who undertakes the usual priestly functions away from their home community.) where he soon fell ill.

Suffering from a protracted illness, he underwent surgery at St. Vincent's Hospital in New York City, where he died the following day on May 24, 1914. The future bishop Jerome Aloysius Daugherty Sebastian was named after him.

== Notes ==
Academic offices
Preceded by John D. Whitney	33rd President of Georgetown University; 1901–1905	Succeeded by David Hillhouse Buel
