= John D. Whitney =

American Jesuit educator (1850–1917)

The Reverend John D. Whitney SJ
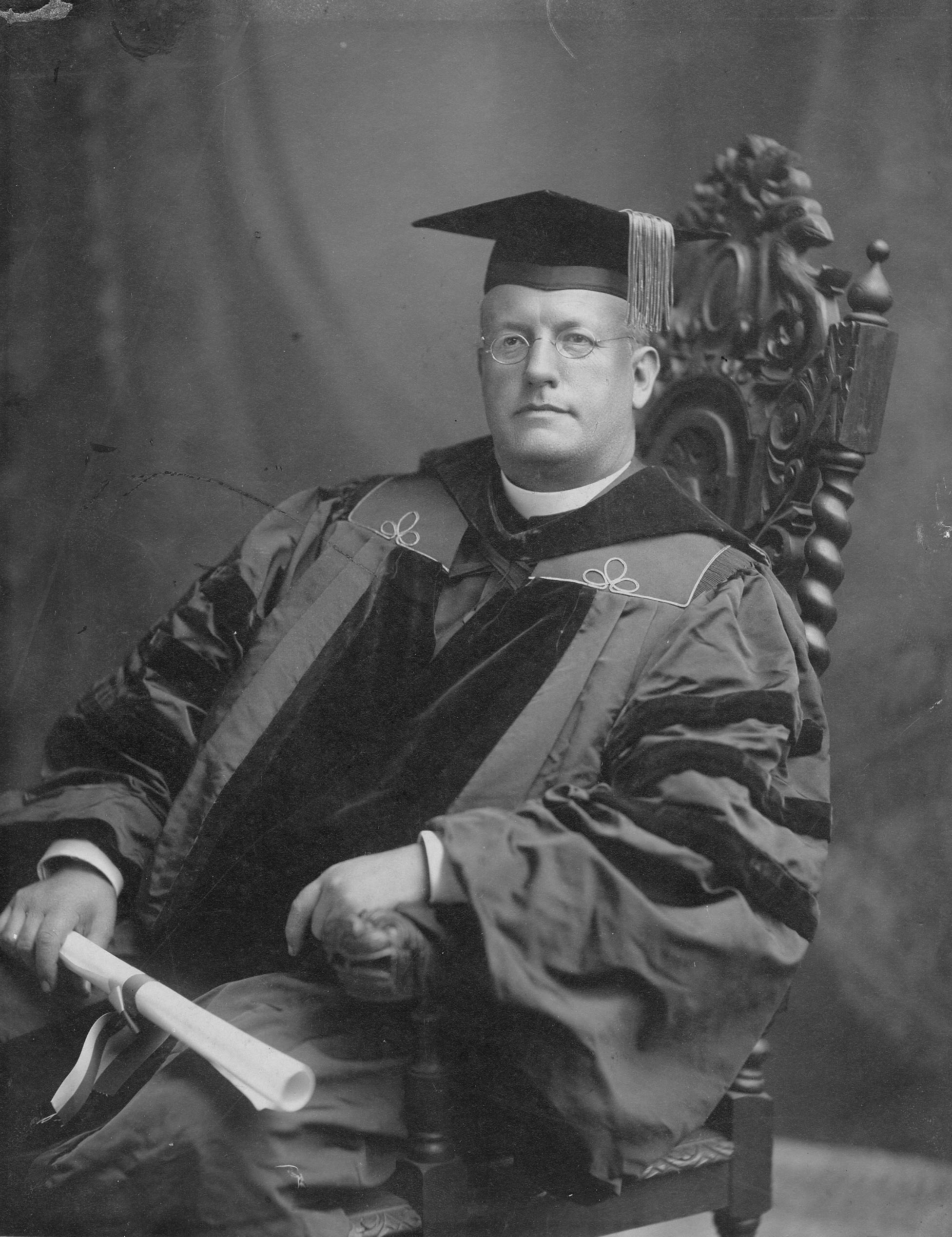
- Whitney in 1906

32nd President of Georgetown University
- In office 1898–1901
- Preceded by: J. Havens Richards
- Succeeded by: Jerome Daugherty

Personal details
- Born: John Dunning Whitney; July 19, 1850 Nantucket, Massachusetts, US
- Died: November 27, 1917 (aged 67) Chestnut Hill, Massachusetts, US
- Resting place: College of the Holy Cross Cemetery
- Education: Stonyhurst College; Milltown Park; Woodstock College

Military service
- Branch: United States Navy
- Years: 1866–1872

Orders
- Ordination: August 15, 1885

John Dunning Whitney SJ (July 19, 1850 – November 27, 1917) was an American Catholic priest and Jesuit who became the president of Georgetown University in 1898. Born in Massachusetts, he joined the United States Navy at the age of 16, where he was introduced to Catholicism by way of a book that accidentally came into his possession and prompted him to become a Catholic. He entered the Society of Jesus and spent the next twenty-five years studying and teaching mathematics at Jesuit institutions around the world, including in Canada, England, Ireland, and around the United States in New York, Maryland, Boston, and Louisiana. He became the vice president of Spring Hill College in Alabama before being appointed the president of Georgetown University.

During his three-year tenure, several improvements were made to Georgetown's campus, including the completion of Gaston Hall and the construction of the entrances to Healy Hall. The Georgetown University Hospital and what would become the School of Dentistry were also established. After the end of his term, he went to Boston College for several years as treasurer before doing pastoral work in Philadelphia, Brooklyn, and Baltimore, where he became the prefect of St. Ignatius Church. He continued to spend time at Boston College, where he died in 1917.

== Early life ==
John Dunning Whitney was born on July 19, 1850, in Nantucket, Massachusetts. Descending from a prominent family, his father was Thomas G. Whitney and his mother was Esther A. Whitney née Dunning. Esther was a devout Congregationalist and John was raised in that faith. He was sent to several public and private schools, including Nantucket High School, before entering the United States Navy in 1866. While serving as a lieutenant aboard the schoolship USS Mercury, he had a religious conversion experience.

=== Conversion to Catholicism ===
Aboard the Mercury, he would often discuss religion with a shipmate, who argued that none of the Protestant churches were the one true church, and that either the Church of Jesus Christ of Latter-day Saints or the Catholic Church was the true church. Whitney was also able to compare the different practices of the Protestant and Catholic chaplains aboard the ship. His conversations with his shipmate convinced Whitney to consider "the claims of the Catholic church". In August 1870, the Mercury was in Newport, Rhode Island, to attend the America's Cup. The captain invited a newlywed Catholic couple aboard to return to New York City from the yacht races. While sailing through the Long Island Sound, the bride dropped a book overboard, and the executive officer had a dinghy lowered into the water to retrieve it. After disembarking in New York, the bride left the book behind, which Whitney discovered to be The Invitation Heeded: Reasons for a Return to Catholic Unity by James Kent Stone, who later became a Passionist priest known as Father Fidelis; the book was written in response to Pope Pius IX's call for all Christians to return to the Mother Church.

Having read the book repeatedly, he approached one of the ship's chaplains, Dominic Duranquet, a Jesuit, and declared that if its contents were true, then he must become a Catholic. After being instructed to pray and study further, he requested to be received into the Catholic Church, with Stone as his godfather. On November 2, 1870 (All Souls' Day), Whitney was conditionally baptized by Duranquet in the Church of St. Paul the Apostle in New York City.

=== Education and teaching ===
Whitney entered the Society of Jesus on August 14, 1872, in the Sault-au-Récollet neighborhood of Montreal, Canada, where he remained for two years. He went to Manresa House in the Roehampton district of London, England, in 1875 to study rhetoric for a year, and then to Stonyhurst College in Lancashire for three years to study philosophy. He taught mathematics for a year before returning to the United States in 1880, where he continued to teach mathematics at St. Francis Xavier College in New York City for four years.

In 1884, he went to Woodstock College in Maryland to study theology. The following year, he was sent to Mobile, Alabama, where he was ordained a priest on August 15, 1885. He began teaching mathematics in 1886 at Spring Hill College, and eventually became vice president of the school. After four years at Spring Hill College, he went to Ireland in 1890, where he studied theology at Milltown Park in Dublin, before returning to Roehampton for his tertianship in 1892.

Whitney then returned to the United States, and began teaching mathematics at St. Charles College in Grand Coteau, Louisiana, from 1893 to 1895. He was transferred to the College of the Immaculate Conception in New Orleans in 1897, and then to St. John's College in The Bronx, later known as Fordham University.

== Georgetown University ==
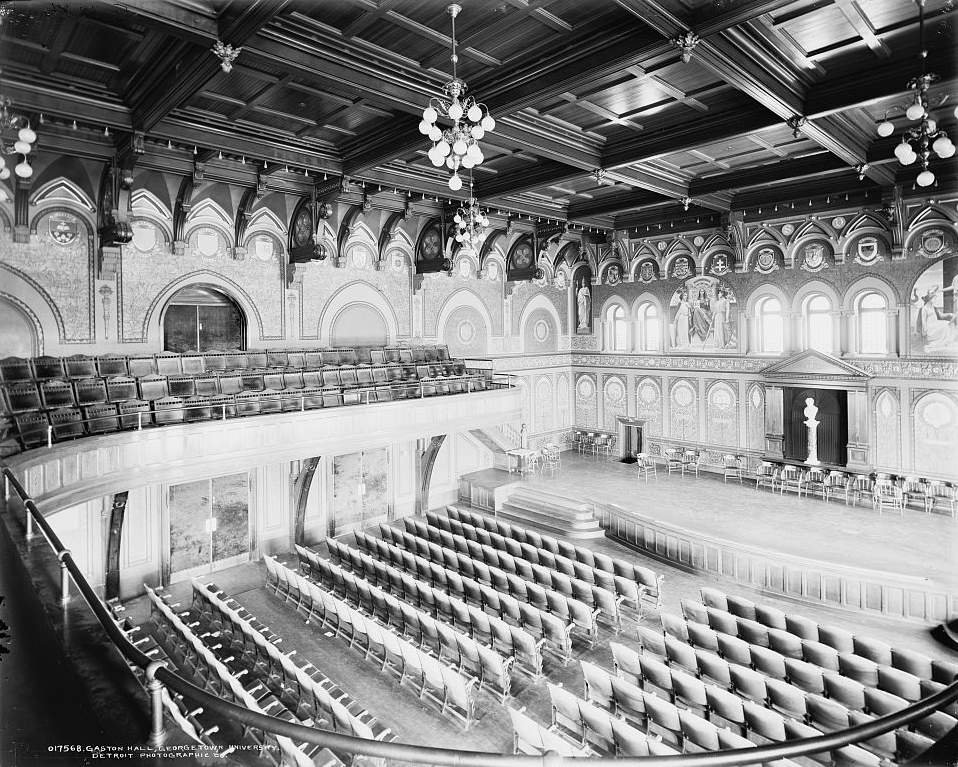
Gaston Hall shortly after completion

Whitney was appointed president of Georgetown University on July 3, 1898, succeeding J. Havens Richards. During his presidency, a number of improvements to the campus were made. The Georgetown University Hospital was opened and the first patient was accepted. Gaston Hall was decorated and completed in 1901. That year, the university also received a donation from Anthony A. Hirst, a wealthy resident of Philadelphia and alumnus of Georgetown College and Law School, to construct Hirst Library inside Healy Hall. The main and center entrances to Healy Hall were completed, walkways were paved, and several campus buildings were renovated, including Dahlgren Chapel.

In 1901, Whitney convinced the faculty of the School of Medicine to reconsider the proposal of a local dentist, W. Warrington Evans, to absorb his Washington Dental College as a department of the medical school, a proposal he had been tendering to the university since 1870. The medical faculty accepted the arrangement in May 1901, and the Washington Dental College became a department in late July. It would eventually become the university's School of Dentistry.

On May 14, 1901, the university hosted Archbishop Sebastiano Martinelli, the Apostolic Delegate to the United States, upon his elevation to the College of Cardinals. The grand reception in Healy Hall was attended by the students and faculty in their academic regalia, as well as many dignitaries, including the Secretary of War Elihu Root, all the justices of the Supreme Court of the United States, all the justices of the federal District of Columbia Court of Appeals (later renamed to a circuit court), most of the foreign ambassadors to the United States, many military and naval commanders, and the faculties of other local universities. While Whitney was popular with the students, the Jesuit provincial superior decided not to renew his term as president, believing he had placed too much emphasis on athletics and was spendthrifty. Whitney's tenure as president came to an end on July 11, 1901, and he was succeeded by Jerome Daugherty.

== Later years ==
Following the end of his presidency at Georgetown, Whitney became the treasurer of Boston College in 1902 and held this post until 1907. While in Massachusetts, he also worked closely with the Sisters of the Good Shepherd, a female religious order. He then left Boston to take up ministry at St. Joseph's Church in Philadelphia, before becoming the prefect of St. Ignatius Church in Baltimore in August 1909. He succeeded Francis X. Brady, who left to become president of Loyola College in Maryland, and Whitney was stationed at St. Ignatius for the remainder of his life.

While at St. Ignatius, he directed the sodality of St. Ignatius Church, which administered the W. G. Read Mullan Scholarship. He spent the year of 1912 in Brooklyn, away from his parish. In May 1916, his health began to deteriorate, and he spent part of 1917 at Boston College in Chestnut Hill, Massachusetts, where he died on November 27. His funeral was held in the Church of the Immaculate Conception in Boston and he was buried at the College of the Holy Cross in Worcester, Massachusetts.

Academic offices
Preceded by J. Havens Richards	32nd President of Georgetown University; 1898–1901	Succeeded by Jerome Daugherty
Catholic Church titles
Preceded by Francis X. Brady	Prefect of St. Ignatius Church; 1909–1917	Succeeded by –
