= Oliver Prince Buel =

American lawyer

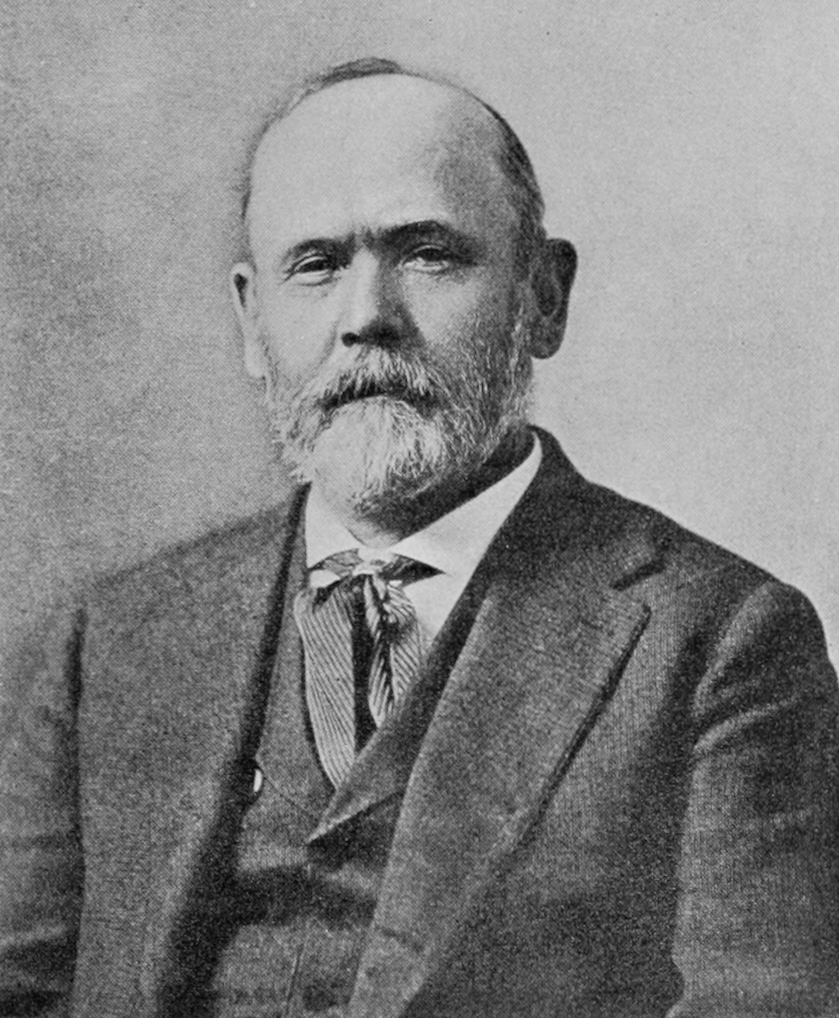
- Born: January 22, 1838; Troy, New York
- Died: April 7, 1899 (aged 61); New York, New York
- Burial place: Oakwood Cemetery
- Education: Williams College
- Occupations: Lawyer, banker
- Spouse: Josephine Maria McDougall (m. 1875)

Signature
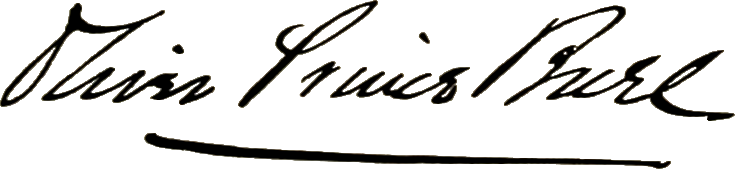

Oliver Prince Buel (January 22, 1838 – April 7, 1899) was an American lawyer and banker.

== Early life ==
Buel was born on January 22, 1838, in Troy in Rensselaer County, New York. He was the youngest of eight children of Judge David Buel (1784–1860) and Harriet (née Hillhouse) Buel (1792–1866). His father, originally from Litchfield County, Connecticut, was a Judge of the Court of Common Pleas. Among his siblings were elder brothers, the Rev. Samuel Buel (father of Lt.-Col. David Hillhouse Buel), the Rev. David Hillhouse Buel, John Griswold Buel, Col. Clarence Buel, and Hambden Buel.

His paternal grandparents were David Buel and Rachel (née McNiel) Buel, and his maternal grandparents were John Griswold Hillhouse (brother of U.S. Senator James Hillhouse) and Elizabeth (née Mason) Hillhouse of Montville, Connecticut.

He graduated from Williams College in 1859.

== Career ==
After being admitted to the bar in Troy, Buel practiced law in Troy from 1865 to 1870 before moving to New York City and forming his own law firm with Joel B. Erhardt later known as Buel, Erhardt & Blackwell. He was afterwards associated with W. A. Ogden Hegeman and, later, Buel, Toucey and Whiting (later known as Patterson, Buel, Touchey & Whiting).

In 1881, Buel was a founding trustee of the Metropolitan Trust Company which was organized by his cousin, Gen. Thomas Hillhouse, who had just resigned as the Assistant Treasurer of the United States in New York City (following eleven years in that position after being appointed by President Ulysses S. Grant in 1870. Hillhouse served as president until his death in July 1897 when he was succeeded by Brayton Ives.

== Personal life ==
On December 28, 1875, Buel was married to Josephine Maria (née McDougall) Buel, in Jefferson Barracks, Missouri. Originally from Indianapolis, Josephine was the widow of Lt.-Col. David Hillhouse Buel, who was actually Buel's nephew. Oliver became stepfather to her son, David Hillhouse Buel, a Yale graduate who became ordained as a Roman Catholic priest in 1898 and the 34th President of Georgetown University in 1905 (he later left the Jesuit order to marry, and subsequently became an Episcopal priest). Josephine's other child was Josephine Maria Buel, although she later changed her name to Violet McDougal, she married critic George Merriam Hyde.

Buel died at his home, 1037 Fifth Avenue (corner of Fifth Avenue and 85th Street), in New York on April 7, 1899. He was buried at Oakwood Cemetery in Troy.
