= Nantucket High School =

Location
- 10 Surfside Road; Nantucket, Massachusetts 02554; United States; 41°16′24.5″N 70°5′54.8″W

Information
- Type: Public high school
- Established: 1838
- School district: Nantucket Public Schools
- Principal: Mandy Hilemn
- Teaching staff: 48.92 (FTE)
- Grades: 9–12
- Enrollment: 593 (2023-2024)
- Student to teacher ratio: 12.12
- Campus size: 20.35 acres (valued at $62 million)
- Campus type: Rural
- Colors: Navy Blue & White
- Mascot: Hank the Harpoon Man
- Nickname: Whalers
- Newspaper: "Veritas"
- Budget: $4.7 million
- Website: nhs.npsk.org

Nantucket High School is a public high school in Nantucket, Massachusetts, United States. It is the only high school on the island of Nantucket. The school serves students in grades 9–12 and has an approximate enrollment of 530 students. The school colors are Navy Blue and White, and the mascot is Hank the Harpoon Man, whose name was chosen by the students in 2013.

== History ==
In 1838, Nantucket High School (NHS) was founded with Cyrus Peirce as the school's first principal. The school's team's name Whalers is in tribute to the long and storied history of the commercial whaling industry on Nantucket. Nantucket is regarded as one of the most recognizable and synonymous places associated with whaling in the world.

In 2019, NHS graduated its largest class in the school's history with 136 students.

== Athletics ==
The Nantucket High School athletic teams are known as the Whalers.

The school fields the following teams: Boys Basketball, Boys Ice Hockey, Boys Lacrosse, Boys Soccer, and Boys Tennis; Girls Basketball, Girls Ice Hockey, Girls Lacrosse, Girls Soccer, and Girls Tennis; Baseball, Cheerleading, Cross Country, Field Hockey, Football, Golf, Sailing, Softball, Swimming and Diving, Track & Field (Indoor and Outdoor), and Volleyball.

There is the skeleton of a juvenile finback whale hanging in the commons area of Nantucket High School that serves as the team's mascot. The Nantucket girls' athletic teams are known as the Lady Whalers, but now commonly known as just the Whalers.

=== Football ===
The Nantucket football team is the school's most successful athletics team and is further regarded as one of the most successful small-school programs in Massachusetts. They have won a total of 4 Massachusetts State Championships. The Whalers won state championships in 1980, 1995, 1996, and 2011. Also, they were State Finalists in 1982, 1983, 1990, 1993, 1994 and 1998. The Nantucket Football team has appeared in the MIAA state Championship game a total of 10 times since 1980.

Nantucket's football team was led by legendary coach Vito Capizzo for 45 years, from 1964 to 2009. Capizzo coached the team to 293 wins (3rd most in Massachusetts history), won 3 State Championships, appeared in 9 State Championship games, won 17 League Championships, and was named Coach of the Year numerous times by many publications. In 2011, Nantucket won its first state championship in fifteen years with a 35–0 rout over Latin Academy (Dorchester, Massachusetts).

Every year, the Nantucket football team plays against Martha's Vineyard for the Island Cup on the weekend before Thanksgiving. The Island Cup is played on Nantucket one year, then on Martha's Vineyard the next year and alternates back and forth.

=== Other sports ===
The Nantucket boys' lacrosse team appeared in the state championship game consecutively for over a decade from 1999 onward.

== Veritas ==
The school newspaper, Veritas, won 14 awards at the 2013 New England Scholastic Press Association ceremony. The paper took the All New England Award for best overall. Traditionally, the Veritas staff has numbered between 30 and 50 students.

== Alumni ==
- Donick Cary
- John D. Whitney
