= Joseph J. Himmel =

American Jesuit priest and missionary

The Reverend Joseph J. Himmel SJ
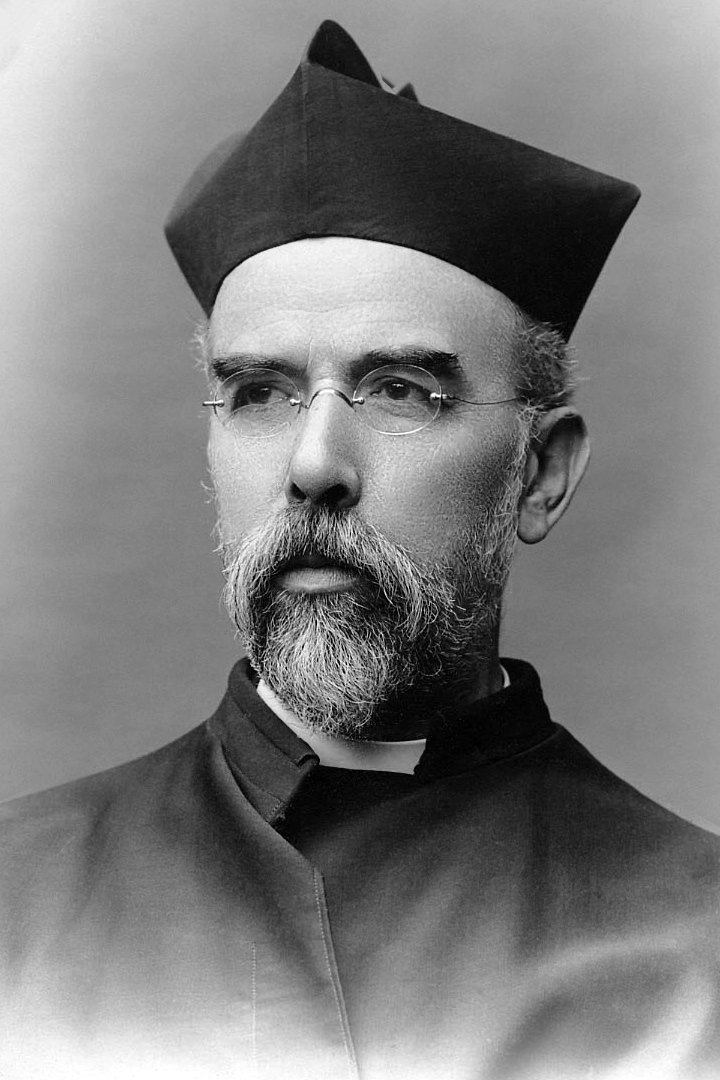
- Himmel in 1910

35th President of Georgetown College
- In office 1908–1912
- Preceded by: David Hillhouse Buel
- Succeeded by: Alphonsus J. Donlon

Personal details
- Born: Joseph J. Himmelheber; January 16, 1855 Annapolis, Maryland, U.S.
- Died: November 3, 1924 (aged 69) Washington, D.C., U.S.
- Resting place: Jesuit Community Cemetery
- Education: St. John's College; St. James' School; Woodstock College; College of the Holy Cross

Orders
- Ordination: August 27, 1885 by James Gibbons

Joseph J. Himmel SJ (born Joseph J. Himmelheber; January 16, 1855 – November 3, 1924) was an American Catholic priest and Jesuit. For much of his early life, he was a missionary throughout the northeast United States and retreat master. Later in life, he was president of Gonzaga College and Georgetown University in Washington, D.C.

Born in Annapolis, Maryland, to German-immigrant parents, Himmel was educated at private schools in Maryland, before entering the Redemptorist Order, of which his father had been especially fond. Early in his training, he was involved in some incident of mischief, and was expelled from the Redemptorist school he was attending, prompting him to immediately pursue admittance to the Society of Jesus, despite having no prior familiarity with the order. Upon being accepted, he began his formation in Frederick, Maryland, eventually being sent to Woodstock College. There, he began experiencing his first illnesses, which would plague him through life. During his studies, he also taught intermittently at Georgetown University and the College of the Holy Cross.

Following his ordination in 1885, Himmel became a missionary in New England and Philadelphia. Over the course of his twenty years of missionary work, he was successful in soliciting donations for the Jesuits' work. Eventually becoming superior of the Jesuit home missions, he was simultaneously named superior of the Jesuit retreat center on Keyser Island, a position be held discontinuously for seventeen years. In 1907, he was named president of Gonzaga College, holding the position for only a year, before being appointed president of Georgetown University in 1908. Due to his poor health, his term came to an end in 1912. He spent the remainder of his life at Keyser Island, as superior of the Jesuit novitiate of St. Andrew-on-Hudson in Poughkeepsie, New York, and as a recluse at Georgetown, due to his illness.

== Early life ==
Joseph Himmelheber was born on January 16, 1855, in Annapolis, Maryland, one of eight siblings, to John and Mary Eva Himmelheber. His mother was born in 1819 in Aschaffenburg in Bavaria, Germany, and died in September 1897. His father was also a German immigrant, who became an engineer for the Maryland State House, where he would remain for twenty years, and moved his family to Annapolis, purchasing the historic Brice B. Brewer, Sr. House. His father maintained an especially close connection with the Redemptorist Fathers in the city, and when he died on March 3, 1895, he was interred in the crypt of the Redemptorists.

=== Education and formation ===
Himmel's Catholic parents sent him to private school throughout his life. Beginning in 1862, he was educated in a private school for four years, before being privately tutored by a priest for three years. For one year in 1869, he enrolled at St. John's College in Annapolis on a Mason Scholarship, before transferring to Saint James School in Hagerstown, where he remained from 1870 to 1871. In light of his father's strong connection with the Redemptorist Order, Himmel then entered the Redemptorist training school in Ilchester, Maryland, with the intention of pursuing a life in the order. After some incident of mischief, Himmel was expelled from the school; though he had never encountered a Jesuit before, he hastily arranged to meet with the Jesuit provincial superior, Joseph Keller, who was at Loyola College, and applied to be admitted to the order. He sought his family's consent, as ordered by the provincial, only after being accepted.

Himmel left for the Jesuit novitiate in Frederick, Maryland, on November 24, 1873, and he made his vows on December 8, 1875. After spending only a year in Frederick to study the classics (because he had previous education in the subject), he was sent to Woodstock College to study philosophy. While there, he suffered poor health and was sent to Georgetown University to recover. He taught and privately studied there, before being transferred to the College of the Holy Cross in Worcester, Massachusetts, a year later; he continued to teach and study there for four years.

He finally returned to Woodstock in 1882 for his theological studies. Himmel was ordained a subdeacon, deacon, and priest at Woodstock on August 27, 1885, by Archbishop James Gibbons, who was assisted by Robert Fulton, the provincial superior of the Society of Jesus. He sang his first solemn high mass on September 4. As late as 1889, Himmel continued to use his parents' surname of Himmelheber, rather than the shortened and anglicized Himmel.

== Missionary and retreat master ==
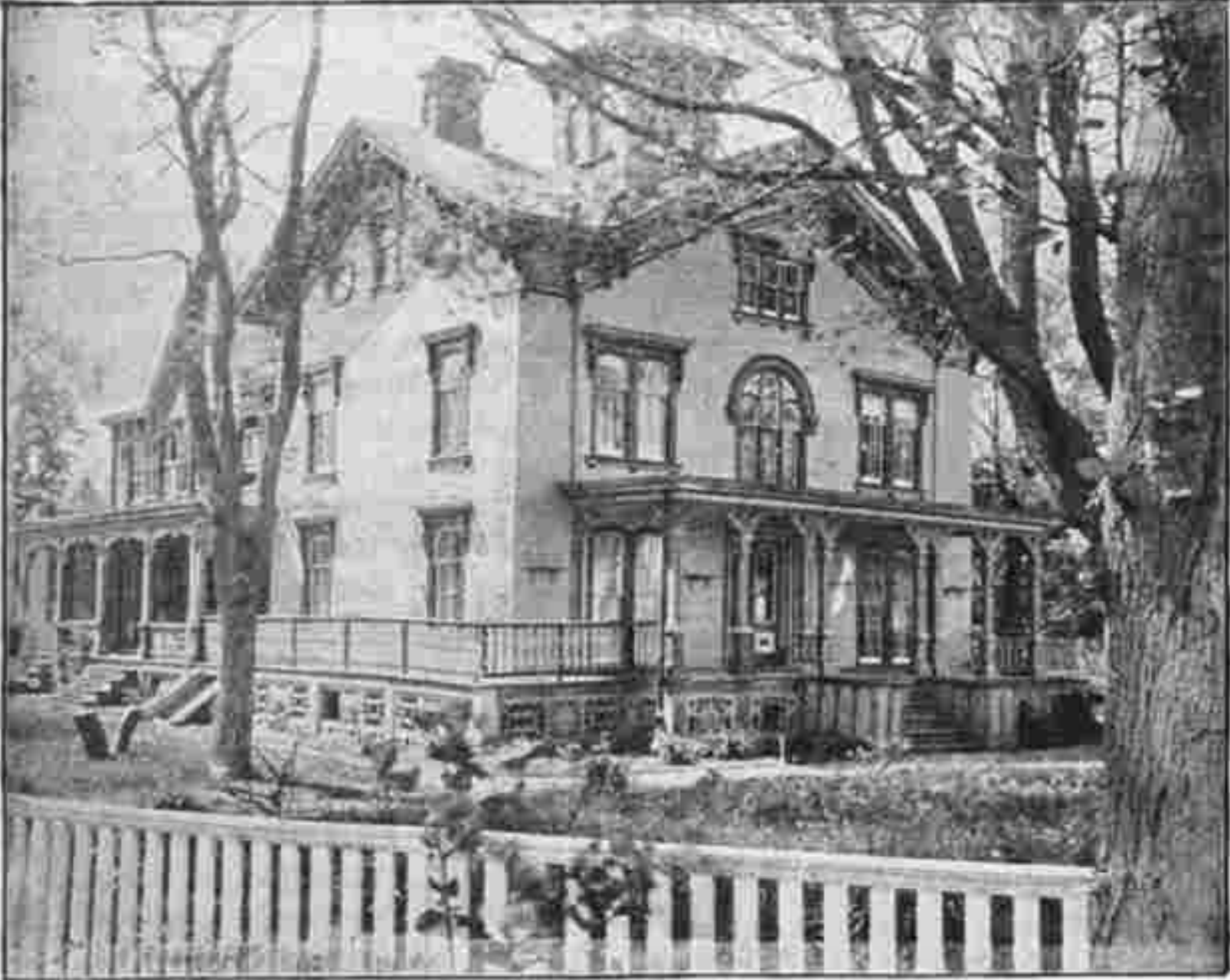
Manresa House on Keyser Island, circa 1896

Immediately after his ordination, Himmel was sent for a year as a missionary to the outskirts of Frederick, due to his poor health. Once deemed strong enough, he was sent for three years as a member of the missionary band to New England, where his mission was stationed out of St. Mary's Church in Boston. The Cathedral of Saints Peter and Paul in Philadelphia was in need of priests, and Himmel was sent there at the request of the mission superior, despite the provincial superior's doubts about his health. There, he garnered a reputation as a capable preacher, being especially popular with the children. During his time on the mission band, he was very successful in soliciting donations; over the course of his eventual twenty years as a missionary, he secured more than $400,000.

In 1889, he returned to Frederick, where he completed the tertianship stage of his Jesuit formation the following year. The following year, he was appointed superior of the Jesuit home missions, holding this position until 1907. His health once again weakened in May 1898, prompting him to spend three months at St. Thomas Manor in Port Tobacco, Maryland.

=== Keyser Island ===
In Philadelphia, Himmel's superiors recognized his aptitude for administration, and he was appointed the superior of the Manresa Institute at Keyser Island in September 1898, which was a retreat center in South Norwalk, Connecticut. Himmel resumed his post as superior of the missionary band in 1903. During his leadership of the island, the center became a popular place of retreat among the Jesuits and the Catholic clergy of Hartford, and Himmel oversaw construction of a chapel and several large houses. He remained as superior of the island until 1907.

== Gonzaga College ==
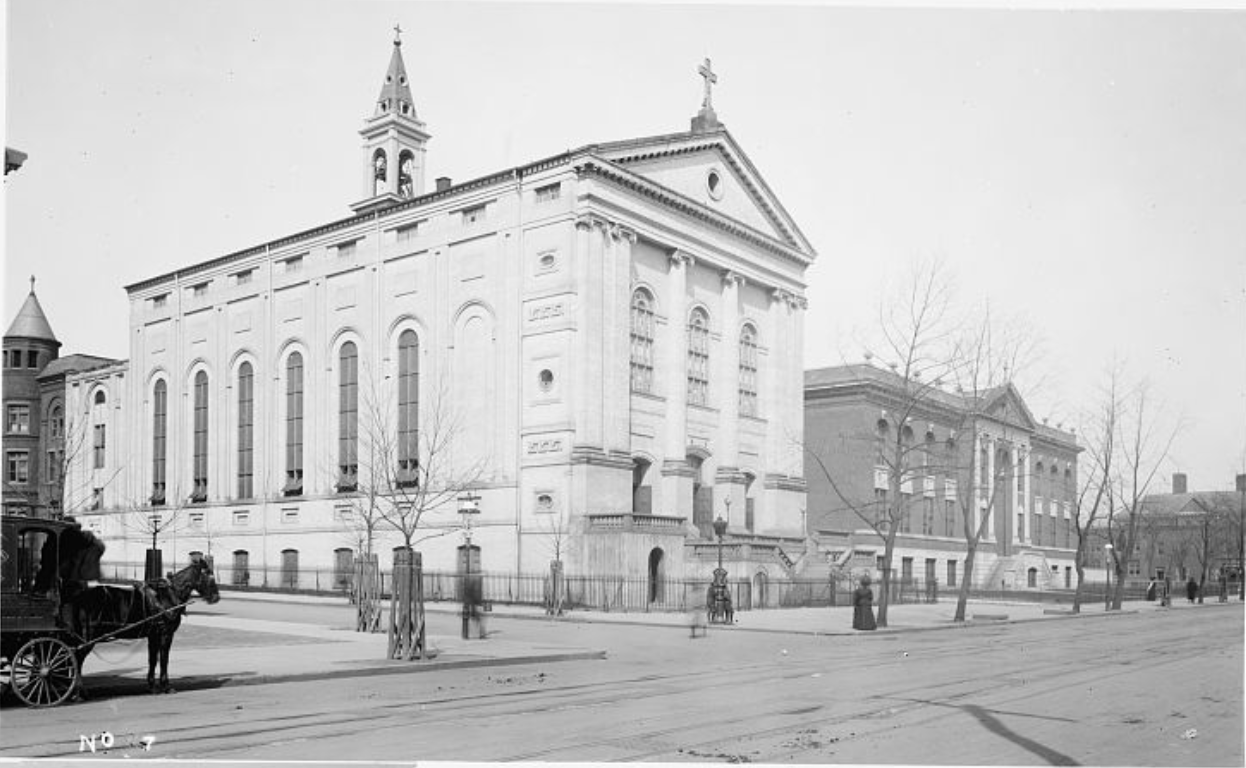
Gonzaga College (right) and St. Aloysius Church (left) in the early twentieth century

On April 26, 1907, Himmel was named the twentieth president and rector of Gonzaga College in Washington, D.C., succeeding Edward X. Fink. During the first summer of his term, he oversaw the refurbishment of the school building, which was falling into disrepair, and involved remodeling its interior. In the spring of 1908, Himmel received Bishop Thomas Augustine Hendrick, the Bishop of Cebu, and Cardinal James Gibbons, the Bishop of Baltimore, who together administered the sacrament of confirmation to 621 people. They were joined by Monsignor Denis J. O'Connell, the rector of the Catholic University of America; William Morgan Shuster, a member of the Philippine Commission, Major Frank McIntyre of the U.S. Army; and Congressmen William Bourke Cockran, Michael E. Driscoll, and Joseph A. Goulden, as honored guests. During the commencement exercises of that year, he also received Diomede Falconio, the Apostolic Delegate to the United States.

His short-lived presidency came to an end on August 27, 1908, when he was named president of Georgetown University. He was replaced by Eugene DeL McDonnell, who became vice (acting) rector, until Charles W. Lyons was named the permanent successor.

== Georgetown University ==
Due to the widespread unpopularity of David Hillhouse Buel among the students and faculty, the Jesuit Superior General sought to find a replacement as president of Georgetown University. The provincial sent three recommendations to the general, who selected Himmel in August 1908.

On November 13, 1909, the Georgetown Hoyas football team played the University of Virginia Cavaliers in Washington. During the game, one of the Cavaliers, Archer Christian, was severely injured on the field, and fell into a coma on the sidelines, only to die of a brain hemorrhage at the Georgetown University Hospital the next day. Himmel immediately suspended Georgetown's football program for the rest of the season; the president of the University of Virginia, Edwin Alderman, followed suit, as did the University of North Carolina at Chapel Hill. On November 17, the faculty of Georgetown decided to permanently abolish football at the university, and Himmel met with the leaders of other Jesuit universities the following month to discuss the complete elimination of football at their institutions and to reduce the prominence of football at colleges.

While his administration of the university was successful, his worsening arterial sclerosis soon prevented him from fulfilling the office, and he wrote to the superior general in summer 1910 that the institution would be better served by a younger president. The Jesuit superiors ordered him to take a leave of absence from the university in 1911, but upon resuming his office, his symptoms worsened. Himmel resigned the presidency, after spending January to May 1912 in the hospital. He was replaced by Alphonsus J. Donlon.

== Later life ==
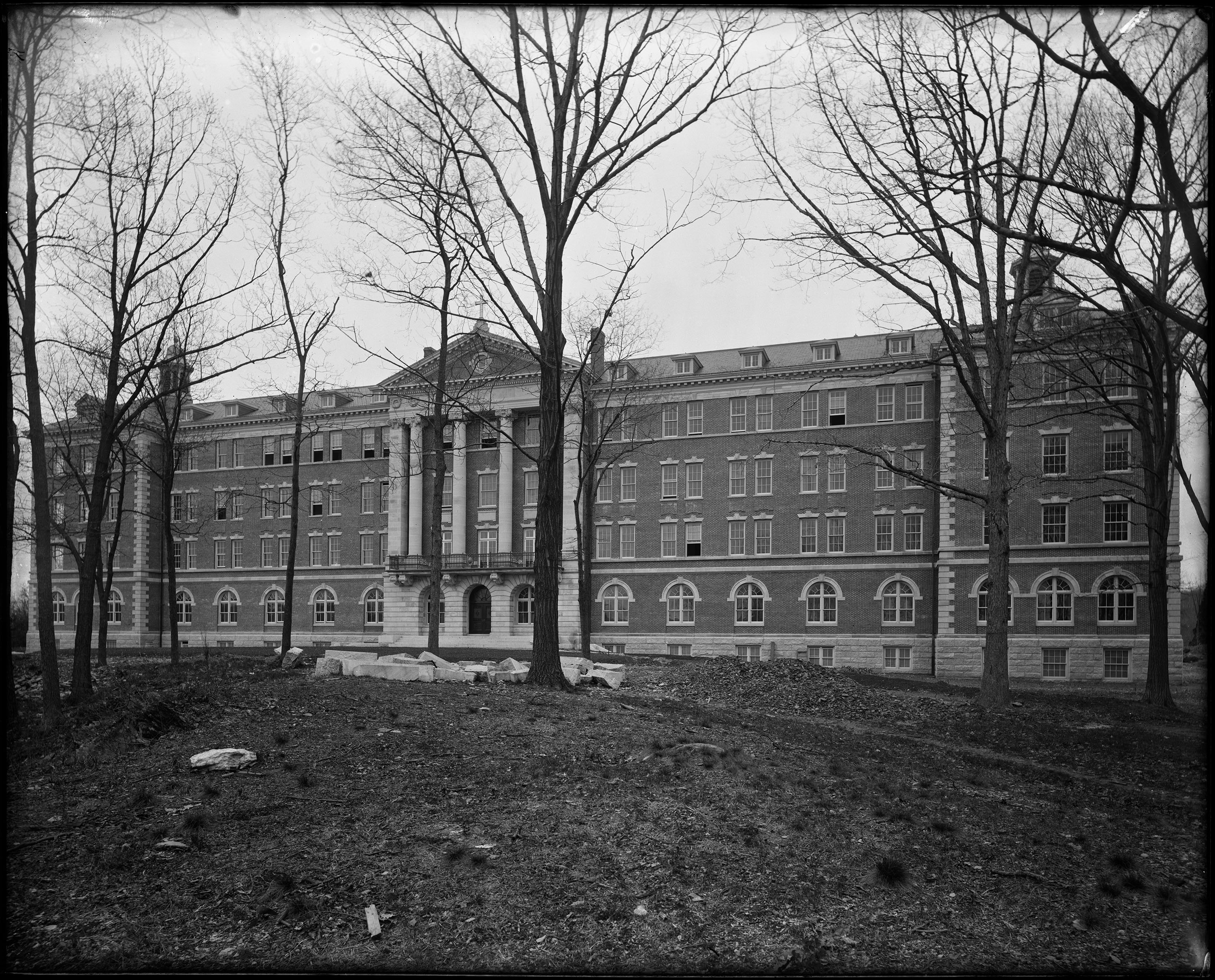
St. Andrew-on-Hudson in Poughkeepsie, New York, circa 1920

=== Superior of Jesuit training institutions ===
Following his discharge from the hospital, Himmel was sent to Keyser Island to recuperate. In October 1912, he was again made superior of the island, and held the post until 1918. In 1913, he simultaneously resumed his position as superior of the missionary band, which he held until 1918; in total, he served as superior of the missionaries for seventeen years.

Himmel became rector of St. Andrew-on-Hudson in Poughkeepsie, New York, a Jesuit scholasticate on October 31, 1915. He remained in this position until, October 11, 1921, when he was succeeded by Fr. William F. Clark. During this time, the Jesuits sought to relocate their novitiate from Yonkers, New York, to their newly created New England vice-province. Himmel was tasked with investigating the suitability and price of various estates in Connecticut for the construction of the novitiate. On December 24, 1921, Himmel returned to Keyser Island to again focus on his worsened health.

=== Return to Georgetown ===
In his later life, Himmel suffered a stroke, which impaired his speech. This caused him to refrain from speaking in public, and he spoke only rarely in private. Given his debilitated state, he was placed in charge of the Georgetown University archives, where he led a largely reclusive life. He died on November 3, 1924, at Georgetown, attending dinner in apparently sound health earlier in the evening. His sole surviving sister, Agnes, was one of the few non-student attendees of the funeral. Himmel was buried in the Jesuit Community Cemetery at Georgetown.

Academic offices
Preceded by –	Superior of the Manresa Institute; 1898–1907	Succeeded by –
Preceded by Edward X. Fink	20th President of Gonzaga College; 1907–1908	Succeeded by Charles W. Lyons
Preceded by David Hillhouse Buel	35th President of Georgetown University; 1908–1912	Succeeded by Alphonsus J. Donlon
Preceded by –	Superior of the Manresa Institute; 1912–1921	Succeeded by William F. Clark
Preceded by –	Rector of St. Andrew-on-Hudson; 1915–1921	Succeeded by William F. Clark
