= James A. Doonan =

American Jesuit educator (1841–1911)

The Reverend James A. Doonan SJ
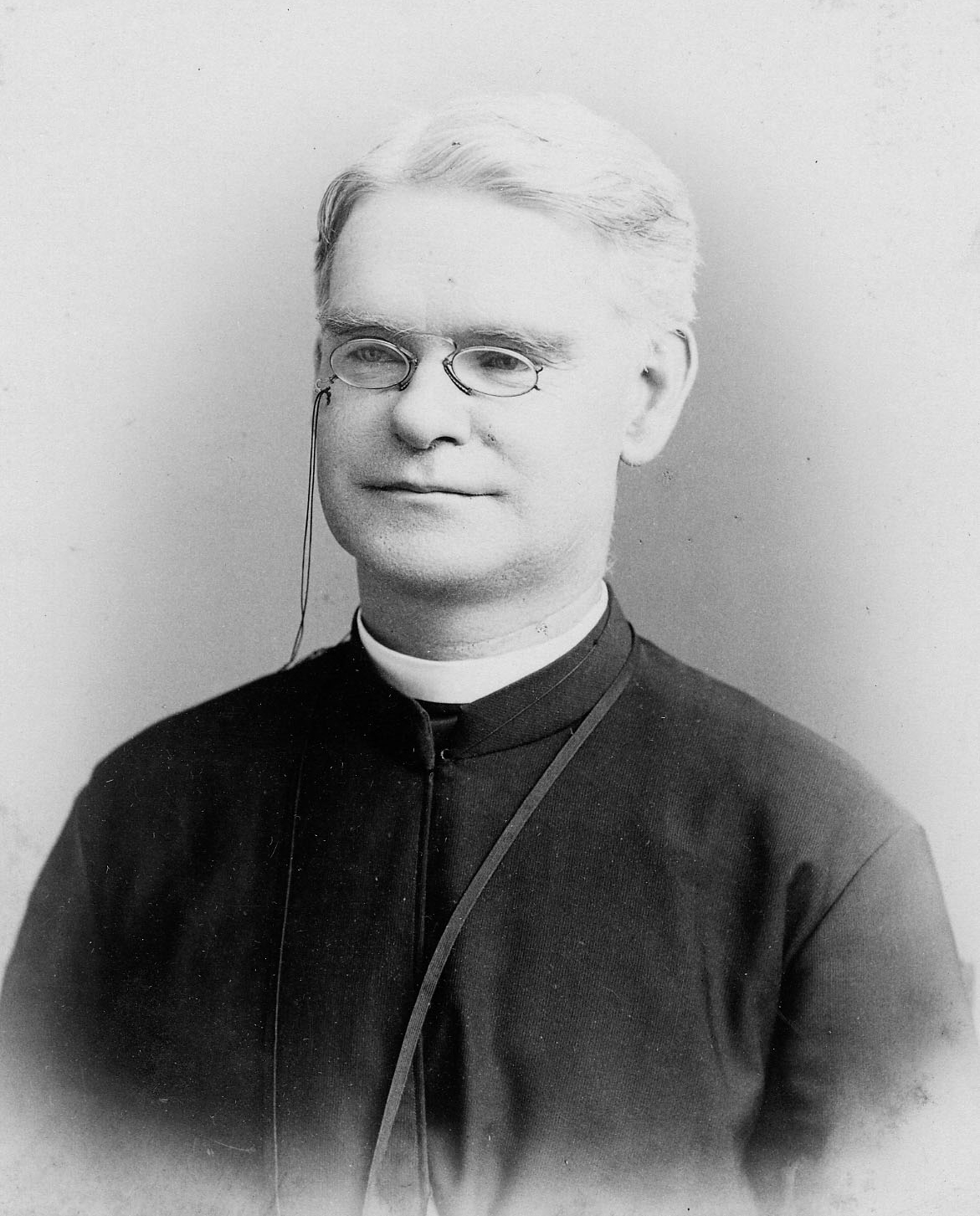
- Doonan in 1890

30th President of Georgetown University
- In office 1882–1888
- Preceded by: Patrick Francis Healy
- Succeeded by: J. Havens Richards

Personal details
- Born: November 8, 1841 Augusta, Georgia, U.S.
- Died: April 12, 1911 (aged 69) Washington, D.C., U.S.
- Resting place: Jesuit Community Cemetery
- Education: Georgetown University; Woodstock College

Orders
- Ordination: 1874 by James Gibbons

James Aloysius Doonan SJ (November 8, 1841 – April 12, 1911) was an American Catholic priest and Jesuit, who was the president of Georgetown University from 1882 to 1888. During that time he oversaw the naming of Gaston Hall and the construction of a new building for the School of Medicine. Doonan also acquired two historic cannons that were placed in front of Healy Hall. His presidency was financially successful, with a reduction in the university's burdensome debt that had accrued during the construction of Healy Hall.

Prior to his administration of Georgetown, Doonan was a student there and at Woodstock College. He then taught at Loyola College in Maryland and Boston College. He spent his later years teaching and ministering at Boston College and at Saint Joseph's College in Philadelphia, as well as at St. Francis Xavier College in New York and at the Catholic Summer School of America.

== Early life and education ==
Doonan was born on November 8, 1841, in Augusta, Georgia. His parents were Ellen Doonan (née Barry) and Terrence Doonan, an engineer and wealthy railroad official who was one of the first Catholics in Atlanta. Terrence was entrusted by the local priest with keeping the parish records until a pastor was appointed, and the first Catholic baptism in Atlanta was performed in his home.

Doonan enrolled at Georgetown University in Washington, D.C., in 1853, and then entered the Jesuit novitiate at Frederick, Maryland, in July 1857. Doonan's brother, John, also became a Jesuit priest. After four years there, James completed his classical course of study, during which he was the captain of the student cadet regiment. He then taught at Loyola College in Baltimore in 1861, where he remained for three years, during the Civil War. Doonan was said to frequently recount a story of the time he was present at a High Mass in Baltimore when word of the approaching Union Army caused the congregants to leave and take up arms. As a staunch supporter of the Confederacy, he was aggrieved at being forced by the Union Army to bear arms on their behalf and act as a sentinel for several hours.

In 1864, Doonan went to Boston College to teach for three years, after which he returned to Washington, where he studied philosophy at Georgetown. His studies were paused in 1868 while he taught for a year at Georgetown, and he then resumed his philosophical and theological studies at the newly established Woodstock College. Doonan was put in charge of the choir at Woodstock, and was noted for his skills on the violin and for his bass voice. He was ordained a priest in 1874 by James Gibbons, at the time the Bishop of Richmond, and he completed his studies at Woodstock in 1875.

== Georgetown University ==
Doonan was appointed a professor of poetry at Georgetown in 1874. In September 1875, he went to Frederick, before returning to Georgetown in 1877 as a professor of rhetoric. He also served as vice president of the university and prefect of studies.

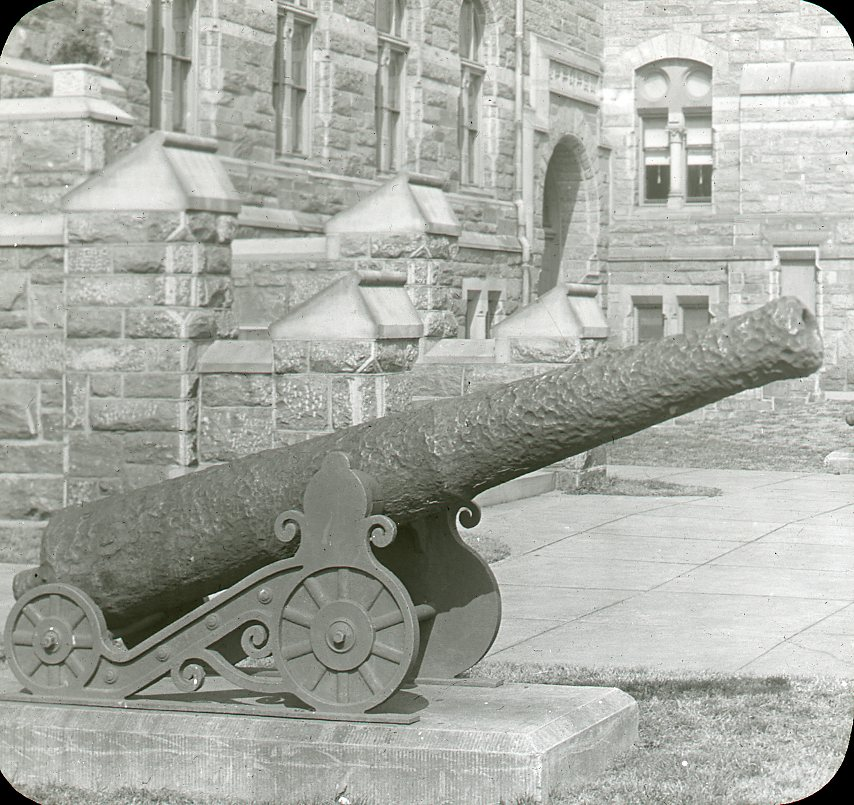
One of the two cannons outside Healy Hall

Upon Patrick Francis Healy's resignation of the presidency due to his declining health, Doonan became the acting president and vice rector on January 27, 1882. On August 17, he became the president of Georgetown University. In this position, he inherited a large debt, small student enrollment, and no endowment. He did continue to receive large donations that had been elicited during his predecessor's term of office; coupled with his sale of a villa in Tenleytown and a farm on Hickory Hill (near Glover Park) that were owned by the university, he was able to reduce the significant debt of more than $300,000, equivalent to $10 million in 2025, which had accrued from the construction of Healy Hall. Doonan redoubled his predecessor's fundraising efforts among the alumni of Georgetown. His efforts were praised by the Jesuit provincial superior, Thomas J. Campbell, and Doonan would leave office with a greatly reduced debt.

For several years, Doonan promoted the idea that a celebration of the university's centenary be organized, which culminated in an official celebration in February 1889. In anticipation of the occasion, in 1885, Doonan purchased two cannons in St. Inigoes, Maryland, for $50. The cannons had been brought to America aboard the Ark and the Dove, which carried the first settlers to the Province of Maryland as part of Lord Baltimore's 1634 expedition to St. Mary's County. Doonan had them placed in front of Healy Hall on November 1, 1888. He also proposed that Healy Hall's main auditorium, which remained unfinished, be completed and named Gaston Memorial Hall after the school's first student, William Gaston.

During Doonan's presidency, a new building was constructed for the School of Medicine, which was designed by Paul J. Pelz and erected on the corner of 10th and E Streets in the summer of 1886. In the following year, the Catholic University of America was established in Washington, leading to considerable tension between its founders and the Jesuits at Georgetown. Bishop John J. Keane, Catholic University's first rector, attempted to resolve this dispute by unsuccessfully offering to purchase Georgetown University, tendering this proposal to Doonan.

Doonan's presidency came to an end in mid-August 1888, when he was sent by the Jesuit provincial superior to New York City, and was succeeded by Joseph Havens Richards.

== Later teaching ==
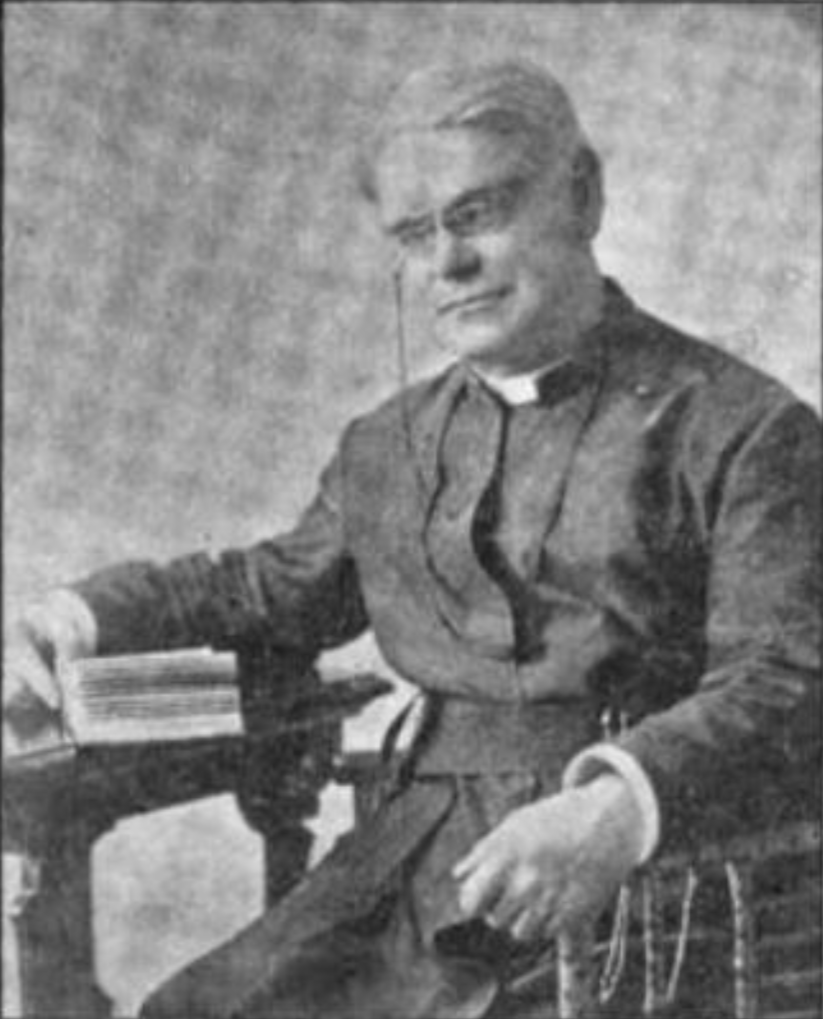
Doonan in later life

Doonan taught philosophy for a year at St. Francis Xavier College in New York, and then for one year in Detroit, Michigan. In 1891, he went to Boston College, followed by a time at Saint Joseph's College in Philadelphia, where he remained until 1896. For at least part of his time at Saint Joseph's, he served as the college's chaplain. He also lectured several times at the Catholic Summer School of America, in such subjects as psychology and education. At this time, Doonan's active ministry came to an end due to his failing eyesight. Fearing that he would become totally blind, he completed a pilgrimage to the Grotto of Our Lady of Lourdes in France; he never did lose his sight completely.

Doonan then returned to Philadelphia, where he suffered a stroke, causing partial paralysis. Nonetheless, he led the annual retreat for the priests of the Diocese of Rochester at Saint Bernard's Seminary in 1897. In 1902, he was appointed the spiritual director of the Jesuit community at Saint Joseph's College and the Church of the Gesú in Philadelphia, succeeding Burchard Villiger. In 1906, he returned to Georgetown University, where he lived out the remainder of his life. Despite his impaired condition, he continued to say Mass daily until one week before his death on April 12, 1911. Doonan was buried in the Jesuit Community Cemetery at Georgetown.

Academic offices
Preceded by Patrick Francis Healy	30th President of Georgetown University; 1882—1888	Succeeded by J. Havens Richards
