= J. Havens Richards =

American Jesuit educator (1851–1923)

The Reverend J. Havens Richards SJ
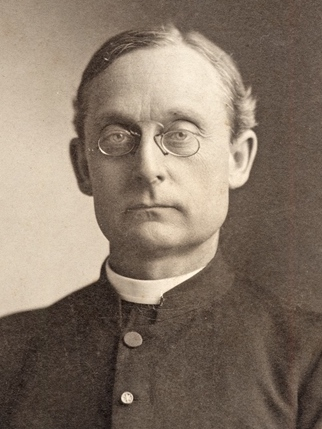
- Portrait, c. 1890s

31st President of Georgetown University
- In office 1888–1898
- Preceded by: James A. Doonan
- Succeeded by: John D. Whitney

Personal details
- Born: Havens Cowles Richards; November 8, 1851 Columbus, Ohio, U.S.
- Died: June 9, 1923 (aged 71) Worcester, Massachusetts, U.S.
- Education: Boston College; Woodstock College; Harvard University

Orders
- Ordination: August 29, 1885 by James Gibbons

Joseph Havens Richards SJ (born Havens Cowles Richards; November 8, 1851 – June 9, 1923) was an American Catholic priest and Jesuit who became a prominent president of Georgetown University, where he instituted major reforms and significantly enhanced the quality and stature of the university. Richards was born to a prominent Ohio family; his father was an Episcopal priest who controversially converted to Catholicism and had the infant Richards secretly baptized as a Catholic.

Richards became the president of Georgetown University in 1888 and undertook significant construction, such as the completion of Healy Hall, which included work on Gaston Hall and Riggs Library, and the building of Dahlgren Chapel. Richards sought to transform Georgetown into a modern, comprehensive university. To that end, he bolstered the graduate programs, expanded the School of Medicine and Law School, established the Georgetown University Hospital, improved the astronomical observatory, and recruited prominent faculty. He also navigated tensions with the newly established Catholic University of America, which was located in the same city. Richards fought anti-Catholic discrimination by Ivy League universities, resulting in Harvard Law School admitting graduates of some Jesuit universities.

Upon the end of his term in 1898, Richards engaged in pastoral work attached to Jesuit educational institutions throughout the northeastern United States. He became the president of Regis High School and the Loyola School in New York City in 1915, and he was then made superior of the Jesuit retreat center on Manresa Island in Connecticut. Richards died at the College of the Holy Cross in 1923.

== Early life ==
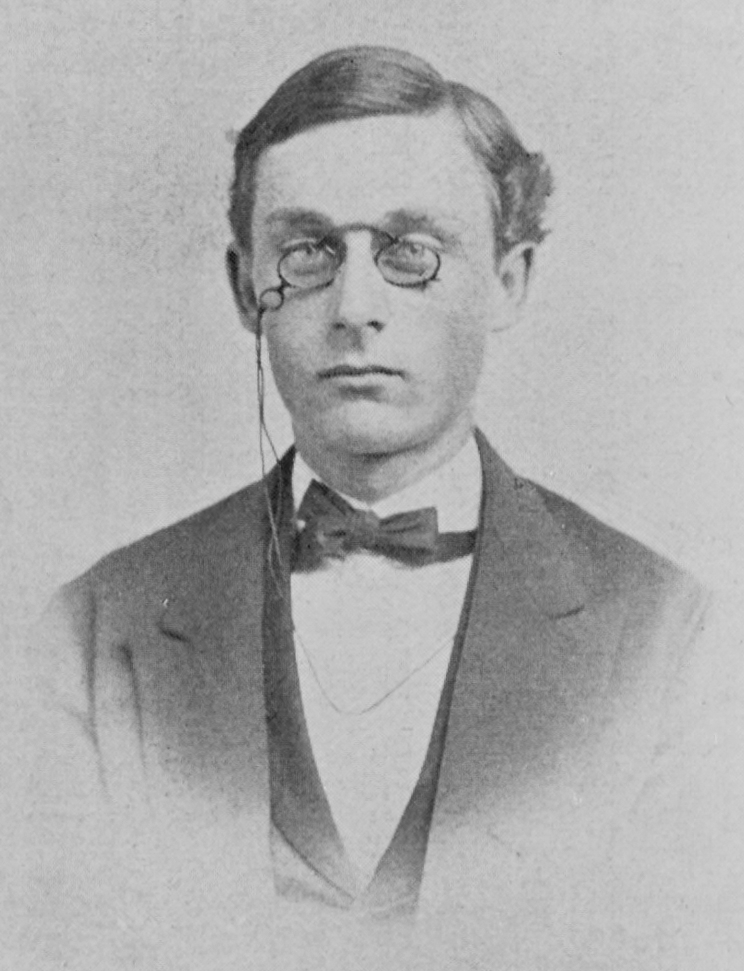
Richards as a student at Boston College

Richards was born on November 8, 1851, in Columbus, Ohio. His parents were Henry Livingston Richards (Note: Henry Livingston Richards's name was sometimes spelled as Livingstone.) and Cynthia Cowles, who married on May 1, 1842, in Worthington, Ohio. Havens Cowles was the youngest of eight children, three of whom died in infancy. His surviving siblings were: Laura Isabella (b. 1843), Henry Livingston, Jr. (b. 1846), and William Douglas (b. 1848).

Henry Livingston Richards was an Episcopal priest and the pastor of a church in Columbus. To the surprise of many, on January 25, 1852, he sought to convert to Catholicism, two months after Havens Cowles's birth. He was said to have been moved during a visit to New Orleans, where he saw whites and enslaved blacks receiving the Eucharist side by side at the altar rail in a Catholic church. He was baptized by Caspar Henry Borgess at the Holy Cross Church in Columbus. One day, following his conversion, he sneaked out of the house with the infant Havens Cowles and brought him to Holy Cross, where Havens Cowles Richards was also baptized by Borgess. These two conversions disturbed Havens Cowles's mother, Cynthia, who was Episcopalian, and her relatives encouraged her to leave her husband. Likewise, Henry Livingston was ostracized by his family and acquaintances in Ohio. As a result, he abandoned his ministry and moved to New York City to search for work in business, leaving his family in the care of his father in Granville, Ohio. While there, Cynthia Cowles followed her husband in converting to Catholicism. She moved with her children to Jersey City, New Jersey, in September 1855 and was conditionally baptized on May 14, 1856, at St. Peter's Church. All the other children were eventually baptized as well.

=== Ancestry ===
Richards was born into a prominent family that traced its lineage to colonial America on both his paternal and maternal sides. His uncle was Orestes Brownson, a Catholic activist and intellectual. On his mother's side, he was a descendant of James Kilbourne, a colonel in the U.S. Army who led a regiment on the American frontier in the War of 1812, founded the city of Worthington, Ohio, and became a United States Representative from Ohio.

On his father's side, Richards's lineage included combatants in the American Revolutionary War, such as William Richards (his great-grandfather), who led a contingent of troops that took part in the siege at the Battle of Fort Slongo and who later fought in the Battle of Bunker Hill as a colonel. Through William Richards, he traced his ancestry to James Richards, who was documented in 1634 as residing on the Eel River in Plymouth, Massachusetts.

=== Education ===
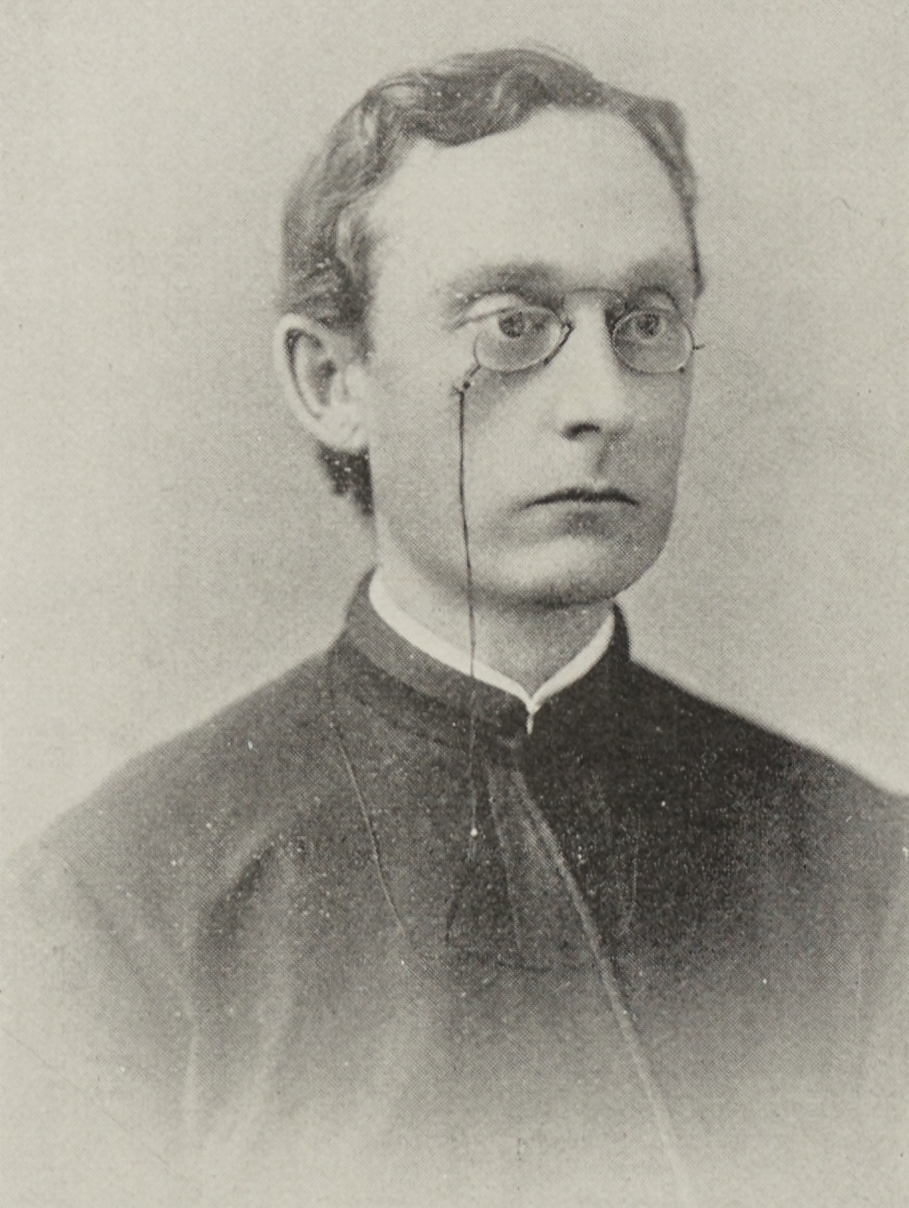
Richards as a young Jesuit

Richards's father sought to send all his children to Catholic schools but was at times unable to. Therefore, Richards attended both Catholic and public schools in Jersey City. At the age of fourteen, he quit school and took up work as a bookkeeper for his father. Four years later, the two of them moved to Boston, Massachusetts, where they worked in the steel industry.

In September 1869, Richards enrolled at Boston College. The rest of his family joined him and his father in Boston in July of that year. Richards remained at the college for three years, where he was active in school sports, before entering the Society of Jesus and proceeding to the novitiate in Frederick, Maryland, on August 7, 1872. Upon entering the order, he changed his name to Joseph Havens Richards.

At the end of his probationary period, Richards was sent to Woodstock College in 1874, where he studied philosophy for four years. He then went to Georgetown University as a professor of physics and mathematics, doing work in chemistry during his vacations. In the summers of 1879 and 1880, he was sent by the Jesuit provincial superior to study at Harvard University. In July 1883, he returned to Woodstock for four years of theological studies. The provincial superior made an exception for Richards to be ordained after only two years because his father was ill. Therefore, on August 29, 1885, he was ordained a priest by James Gibbons, the Archbishop of Baltimore, in the college's chapel. He completed his theological studies in 1887 and returned to Frederick to complete his tertianship.

== Georgetown University ==
Immediately after the completion of his Jesuit formation, Richards was made the rector and president of Georgetown University, taking office on August 15, 1888, and succeeding James A. Doonan. He had a plan to transform Georgetown into a modern, comprehensive institution that would be the leading university of both the Catholic Church and the United States. This role would be amplified by the fact that the university was located in the nation's capital.

=== Curriculum improvements ===
Though Richards sought to dispel the perception that Jesuit schools were of inferior quality than their secular counterparts, he maintained that the curriculum of the Ratio Studiorum should be preserved. Therefore, he revitalized the graduate programs of the university, introduced new courses in the law school, and oversaw construction of a new law building in 1892. He also sought to establish an electrical, chemical, and civil engineering program, but this did not come to fruition. For the first time, graduates of the university were authorized to wear a hood as part of their academic regalia. Richards sought to induce prominent scholars to join the faculty of Georgetown; he recruited the Austrian astronomer Johann Georg Hagen and several distinguished scientists from the Smithsonian Institution.

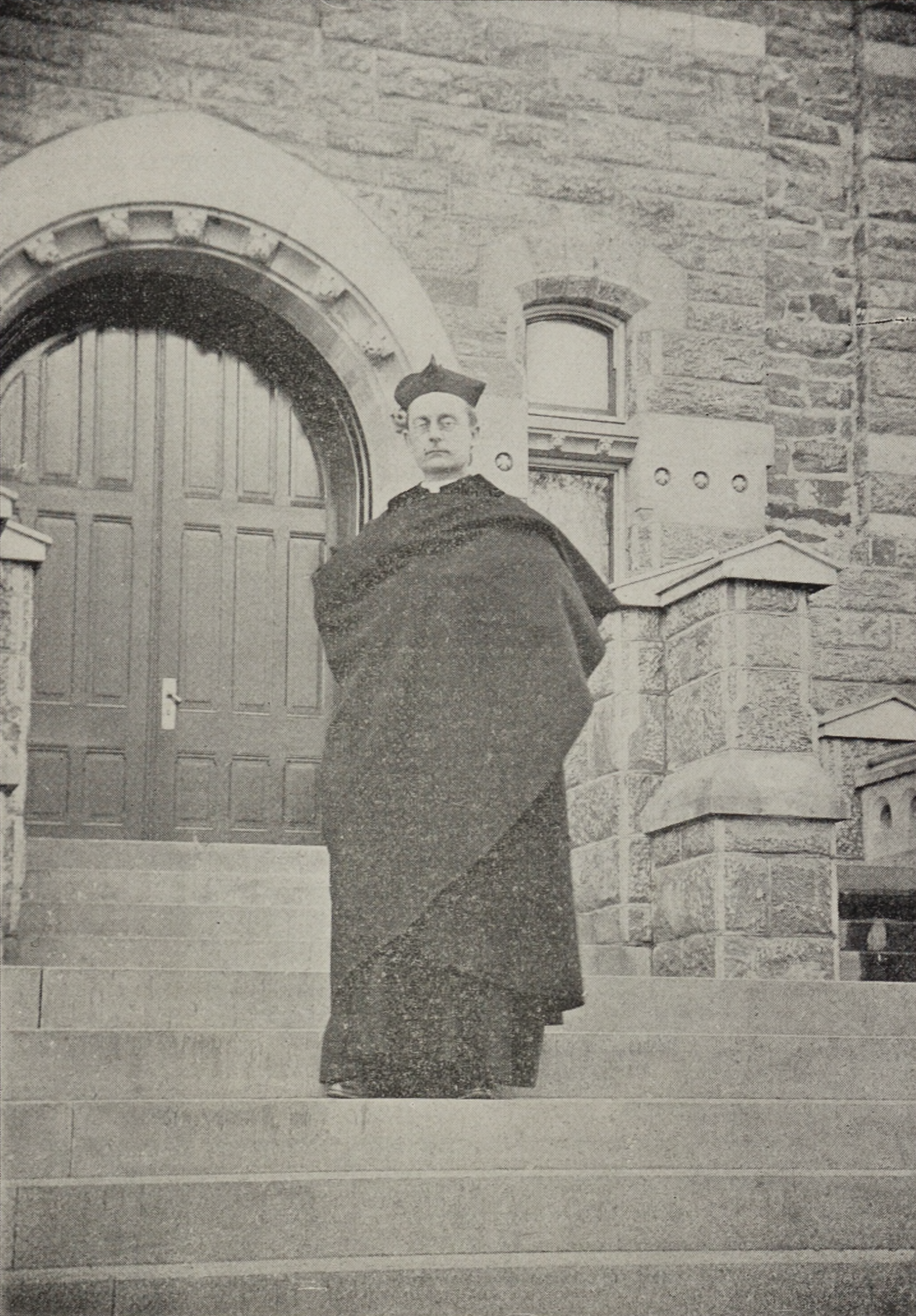
Richards at Healy Hall

Graduate courses in the arts and sciences were re-established in 1889, and courses in theology and philosophy returned to the university, which had previously been moved to Boston and then to Woodstock College. Richards criticized the decision to relocate the theological training of Jesuits from Georgetown to the "semi-wilderness" of Woodstock, which was "remote from libraries, from contact with the learned world, and from all the stimulating influences which affect intellectual life".

Richards expanded the School of Medicine by establishing a chair and laboratory of bacteriology; increasing the number of instructors in anatomy, physiology, and surgery; and improving the chemistry curriculum. He also standardized the curriculum and increased its duration from three to four years. The property of the medical school, which theretofore had been owned by its own legal corporation, was transferred to the President and Directors of Georgetown College, giving Richards authority over the appointment of professors. Richards also desired to have a hospital adjoined to the medical school, but there was initially little interest in this among faculty and donors. Eventually, Georgetown University Hospital was completed in 1898, and it was put under the care of the Sisters of Saint Francis.

Richards worked with Bishop John Keane to address tensions with the newly established Catholic University of America, which was located in the same city and run by the American bishops. Many feared that it would interfere with Georgetown University, and it did indeed seek to take control of Georgetown's law and medical schools as its own. This proposal was approved by the Jesuit superior general, Luis Martín, who feared that the Vatican might suppress Georgetown altogether if it did not acquiesce. The faculties of the law and medical schools publicly protested the proposal, and Catholic University dropped its plans. Eventually, an agreement was reached that Catholic University would focus exclusively on the graduate education of secular priests.

=== Construction ===
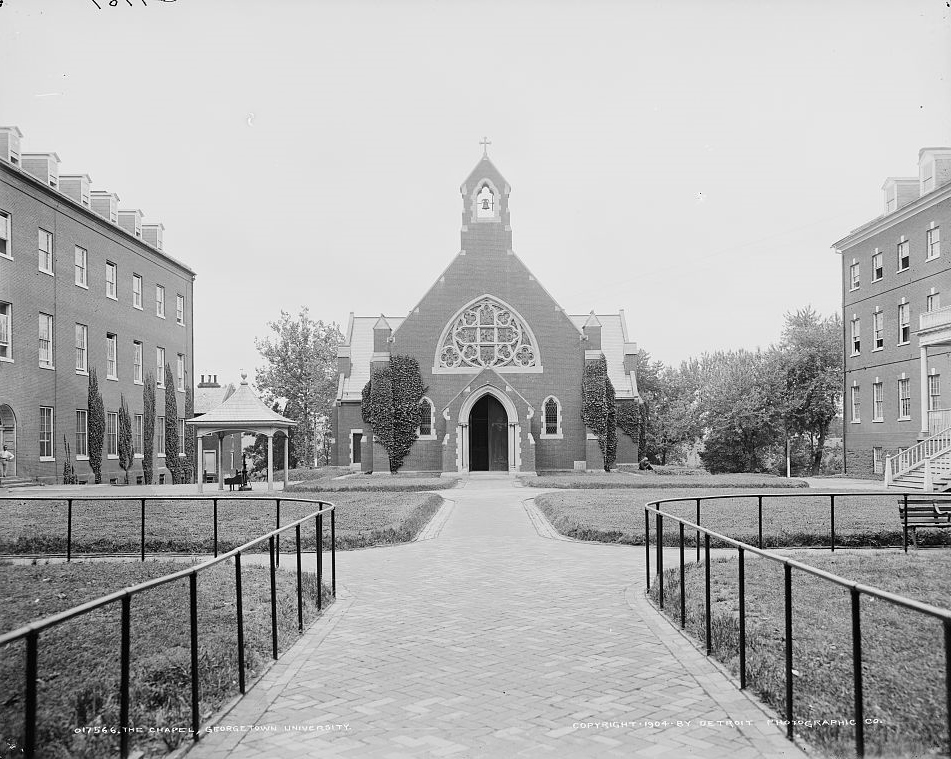
Dahlgren Chapel (photo c. 1904)

Richards's most immediate task upon taking office was the completion of Healy Hall, construction of which began in 1877 under a predecessor, Patrick F. Healy, but whose interior remained unfinished. Richards was able to have the bulk of the work completed by February 20, 1889, the date on which the university began its three-day centenary celebration. Within Healy Hall, he made improvements to Gaston Hall and oversaw the start of work on Riggs Library. Richards improved the university's astronomical observatory, placing Hagen in charge of it, which raised the stature of the university in scientific circles.

In 1892 Richards received a donation from the socialite Elizabeth Wharton Drexel for the construction of Dahlgren Chapel of the Sacred Heart. That year, he also procured the library of historian John Gilmary Shea, which extensively documented the history of the Catholic Church in the United States. Richards's presidency came to an end on July 3, 1898, by which time he had experienced worsening health for two years. He was succeeded by John D. Whitney.

=== Anti-Catholicism in the Ivy League ===
Richards also took up the cause of fighting discrimination against Catholics by prominent Protestant universities, especially those of the Ivy League. In 1893, James Jeffrey Roche, the editor of the Catholic Boston newspaper The Pilot, wrote to Charles William Eliot, the president of Harvard University, about the fact that no Catholic universities were included on the list of institutions whose graduates were automatically eligible for admission to Harvard Law School. Eliot's response, which was published in The Pilot, was that the quality of education at Catholic universities was inferior to that offered at their Protestant counterparts. Richards and other Catholic educators had long believed that anti-Catholic discrimination had been at work at Protestant colleges.

Richards sought a retraction from Eliot, writing to him that graduates of reputable Catholic colleges were better prepared to study law than any other college graduates, and he included information on Georgetown's curriculum. Eliot responded by adding Georgetown, the College of the Holy Cross, and Boston College to the list. Upon the provincial superior's instruction, Richards then unsuccessfully lobbied to have all 24 Jesuit colleges in the United States added to the list.

== Pastoral work ==
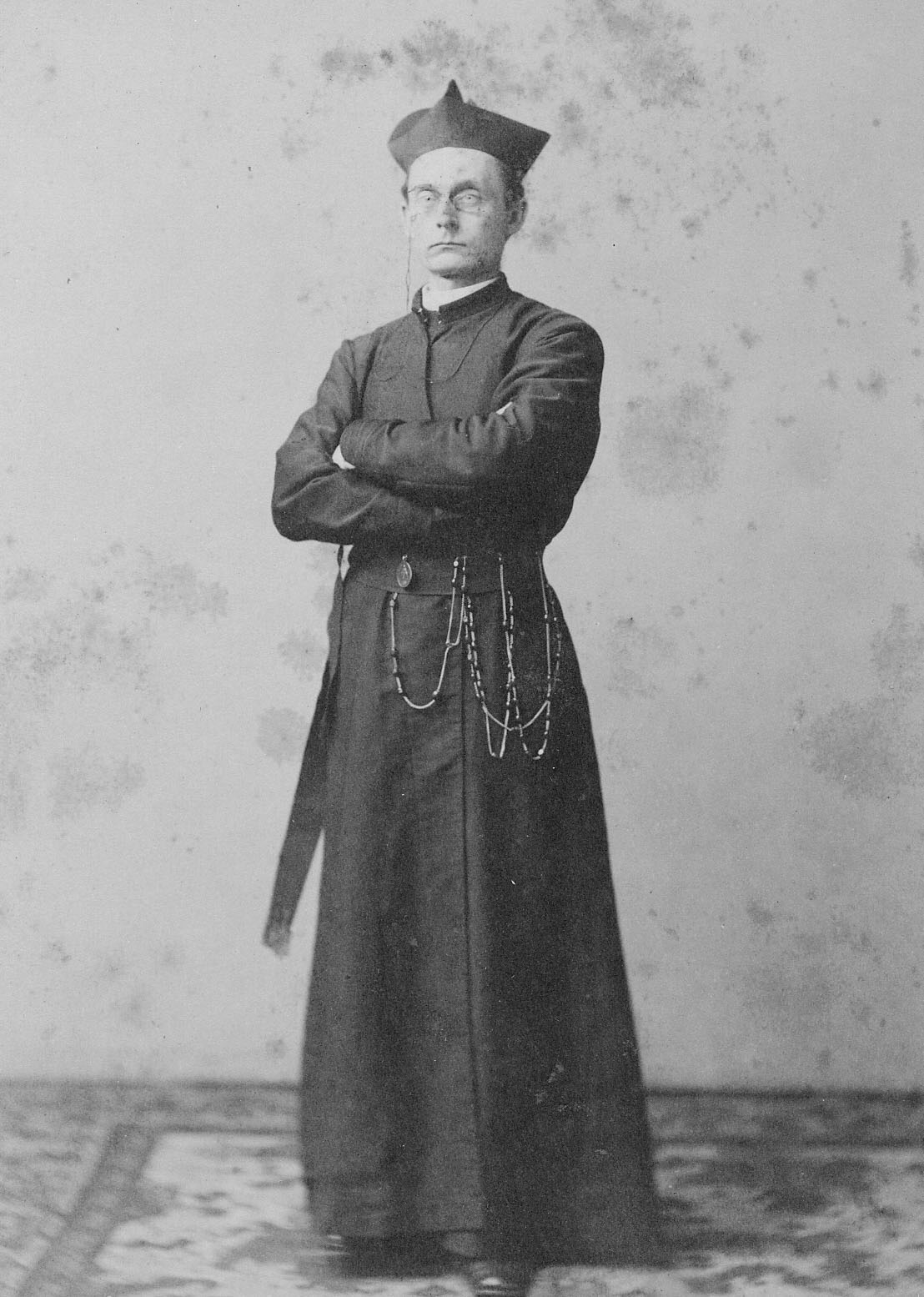
Richards in 1890

Following his retirement from the presidency, Richards became the spiritual father of the novitiate in Frederick. He remained interested in Georgetown's astronomical observatory, and he petitioned to have a station established in South Africa so that the entire sky could be studied. The following year, he became the spiritual father of Boston College, where he established the Boston Alumni Sodality. When not in Boston, he spent time in Philadelphia and Brooklyn, where he worked with the New York Sodality. He also began cataloguing Catholic works in the New York Public Library, but his health soon prevented him from continuing. Upon the recommendation that it would benefit his health, Richards moved to the novitiate in Los Gatos, California, in March 1900, but he was there only briefly before visiting his family in Boston after his mother's death.

Richards returned to Los Gatos in April. In early 1901, he moved back to Frederick, Maryland, where he became minister of the novitiate. Richards then went to St. Andrew-on-Hudson in Hyde Park, New York, as minister in January 1903, when the novitiate relocated there. Several months later, he was made the procurator and was placed in charge of the mission in Pleasant Valley. He transferred again to Boston College in 1906 as spiritual father, remaining there for a year. From 1907 to July 1909, he was prefect of the Church of St. Ignatius Loyola at Boston College.

Richards then proceeded to the Church of St. Ignatius Loyola in New York City as operarius. (Note: An operarius is a Jesuit who works as a priest away from his Jesuit community.) After four years, he was sent to Canisius College in Buffalo as minister and prefect of studies. He ceased to be minister in July 1914 but remained as prefect. He was appointed the rector and president of both Regis High School and the Loyola School in New York the following year, succeeding David W. Hearn. Concurrently, he became the pastor of the Church of St. Ignatius Loyola. Being advanced in age, he retired from the position on March 25, 1919, and was succeeded by James J. Kilroy as pastor and as president of Regis and Loyola.

== Later years ==
Following his positions in New York, Richards was made superior of Manresa Island in Norwalk, Connecticut, where he received Jesuit scholastics and priests from the Diocese of Hartford during the summer for their retreats. During the rest of the year, he lived on the island with just one other Jesuit. In December 1921, he was transferred to Weston College as spiritual father and procurator, ceasing to hold the latter role in September 1922.

On March 2, 1923, Richards suffered a stroke, which left his speech impaired and the right side of his body paralyzed. He spent seven weeks in the hospital before going to the College of the Holy Cross in Worcester, Massachusetts. He suffered another stroke on June 8 and died the following day.

Academic offices
Preceded by James A. Doonan	31st President of Georgetown University; 1888–1898	Succeeded by John D. Whitney
Preceded by David W. Hearn	4th President of Loyola School; 1915–1919	Succeeded by James J. Kilroy
Preceded by David W. Hearn	2nd President of Regis High School; 1915–1919	Succeeded by James J. Kilroy
Catholic Church titles
Preceded by David W. Hearn	16th Pastor of the Church of St. Ignatius Loyola; 1915–1919	Succeeded by James J. Kilroy
