= Fordham University =

Jesuit university in New York City, New York, US

- Latin: Universitas Fordhamensis
- Former names: St. John's College (1841–1907); Marymount College (1907–2002)
- Motto: Sapientia et Doctrina (Latin)
- Motto in English: "Wisdom and Learning"
- Type: Private research university
- Established: June 24, 1841; 185 years ago
- Founder: John Hughes
- Accreditation: MSCHE
- Religious affiliation: Catholic (Jesuit)
- Academic affiliations: ACCU; AJCU; NAICU
- Endowment: $1.05 billion (2025)
- President: Tania Tetlow
- Provost: KerryAnn O'Meara
- Faculty: 747
- Students: 16,150 (fall 2026)
- Undergraduates: 10,582 (fall 2026)
- Postgraduates: 5,568 (fall 2026)
- Location: New York City, New York, United States; 40°51′43″N 73°53′10″W
- Campus: total: 125.39 acres (50.7 ha); Rose Hill (Bronx): 85 acres (34.4 ha); Lincoln Center (Manhattan): 8 acres (3.2 ha); Large city
- Other campuses: West Harrison; Clerkenwell
- Newspaper: The Observer; The Fordham Ram
- Colors: Maroon and white
- Nickname: Rams
- Sporting affiliations: NCAA Division I FCS – Atlantic 10; Patriot League (football); MAWPC; ECHC; MAISA
- Mascot: The Ram
- Website: fordham.edu
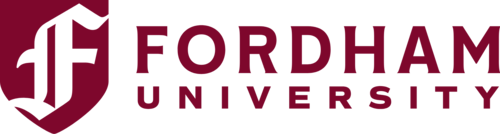

Fordham University is a private Jesuit research university in New York City, United States. Established in 1841, it is named after the Fordham neighborhood of the Bronx, in which its original campus is located. Fordham is the oldest Catholic and Jesuit university in the northeastern United States and the third-oldest university in New York City.

Founded as St. John's College by John Hughes, then a coadjutor bishop of New York, the college was placed in the care of the Society of Jesus shortly thereafter, and has since become a Jesuit-affiliated independent school under a lay board of trustees. While governed independently of the church since 1969, every president of Fordham University between 1846 and 2022 (Note: Fordham's first layperson and first woman to serve as president, Tania Tetlow J.D., took office on July 1, 2022) was a Jesuit priest and the curriculum remains influenced by Jesuit educational principles.

Fordham enrolls over 16,000 students, making Fordham the sixth largest Catholic university in terms of enrollment in the United States. The university is organized into ten constituent colleges, four of which are undergraduate and six of which are postgraduate, across three campuses in southern New York State: the Rose Hill campus in the Bronx, the Lincoln Center campus in Manhattan's Upper West Side, and the Westchester campus in West Harrison, New York. The university also maintains a study abroad center in London and field offices in Spain and South Africa. The university offers degrees in over 60 disciplines.

The university's athletic teams, the Rams, include a football team that boasted a win in the Sugar Bowl, two Pro Football Hall of Famers, two All-Americans, two Canadian Football League All-Stars, and numerous NFL players; the Rams also participated in history's first televised college football game in 1939 and history's first televised college basketball game in 1940. Fordham's baseball team played the first collegiate baseball game under modern rules in 1859, has fielded 56 major league players, and holds the record for the most NCAA Division I baseball victories in history.

Fordham's alumni and faculty include a president of the United States, (Note: Trump attended for two years before transferring.) U.S. Senators and representatives, four cardinals of the Catholic Church, several U.S. governors and ambassadors, a number of billionaires, two directors of the CIA, Academy Award and Emmy-winning actors, royalty, a foreign head of state, a White House Counsel, a vice chief of staff of the U.S. Army, a U.S. Postmaster General, a U.S. Attorney General, a President of the Federal Reserve Bank of New York, and the first female vice presidential candidate of a major political party in the United States.

== History ==
=== 1841–1900: Establishment and early years ===
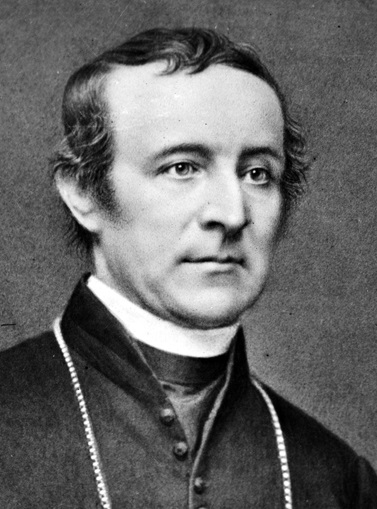
John Hughes, archbishop of New York and founder of St. John's College

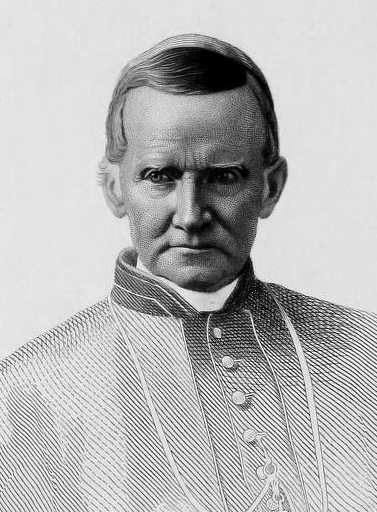
John McCloskey, first president of St. John's College and later cardinal-archbishop of New York

Fordham was founded as St. John's College in 1841 by the Irish-born coadjutor bishop (later archbishop) of the Diocese of New York, John Hughes. It is the third-oldest university in the state of New York, and the first Catholic institution of higher education in the northeastern United States. In 1839, Hughes, then 42 years old, had purchased the 106-acre Rose Hill Manor farm in the village of Fordham, New York, for $29,750. His intent was to establish St. Joseph's Seminary following the model of Mount Saint Mary's University, of which he was an alumnus. "Rose Hill" was the name originally given to the site in 1787 by its owner, Robert Watts, a wealthy New York merchant, in honor of his family's ancestral home in Scotland.

In 1840, St. Joseph's Seminary opened at Rose Hill. The seminary was paired with St. John's College, which opened at Rose Hill with a student body of six on June 24, 1841, the feast day of Saint John the Baptist. (Note: According to Christian tradition, in the Gregorian calendar, June 24 is observed as the Nativity of Saint John the Baptist, and it is mentioned in the 1920 General Catalogue published by the university that the college's opening deliberately coincided with the feast day.) John McCloskey (later archbishop of New York and eventually the first American cardinal) was the school's first president, and the faculty were secular priests and lay instructors. The college presidency went through a succession of four diocesan priests in five years, including James Roosevelt Bayley, a distant cousin of Theodore and Franklin D. Roosevelt and a nephew of St. Elizabeth Ann Seton. In 1845, the seminary church, Our Lady of Mercy, was built. The same year, Hughes convinced several Jesuit priests from the St. Mary's College in Kentucky to staff St. John's.

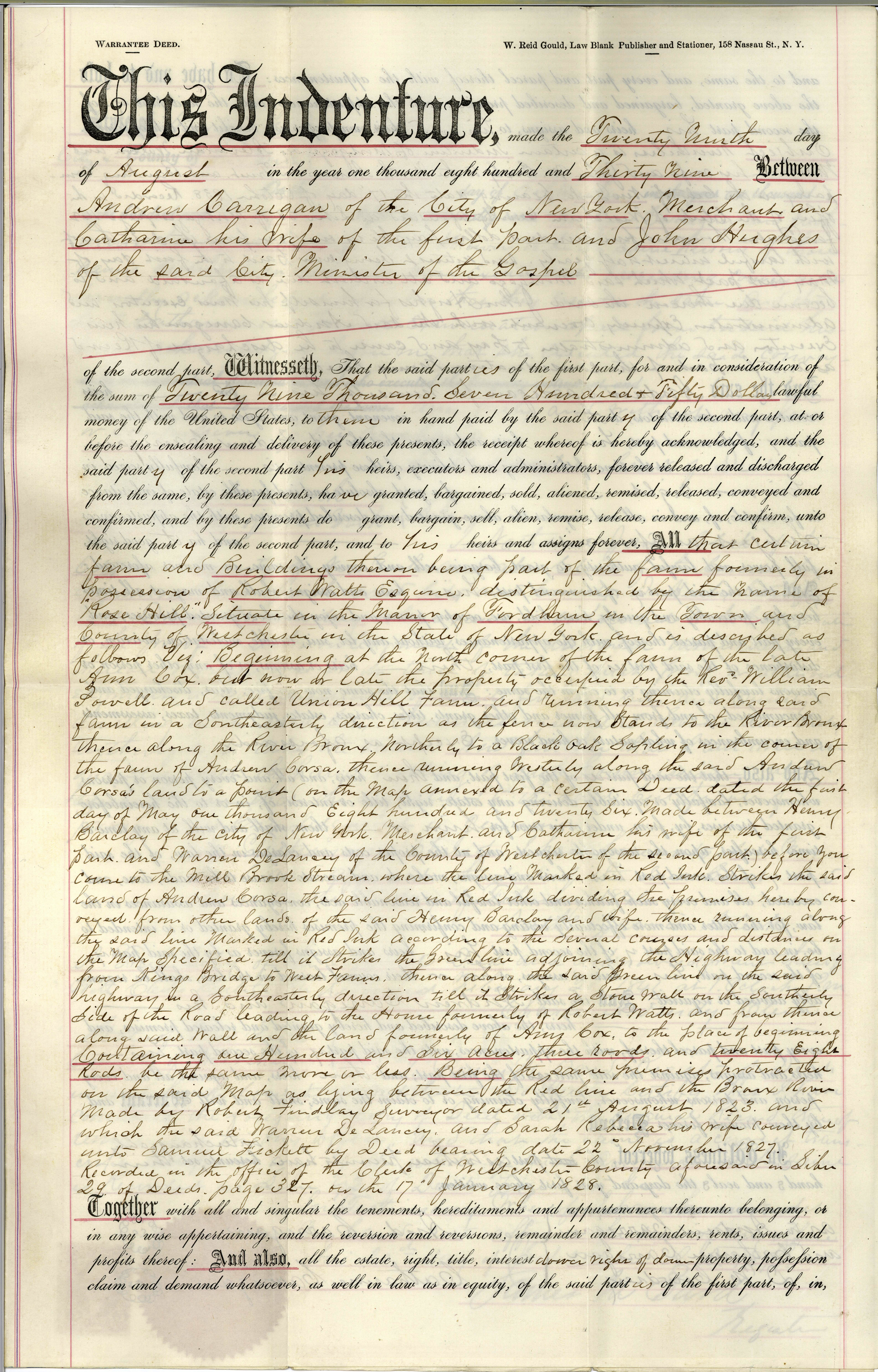
1839 deed to St. John's College and St. Joseph's Seminary

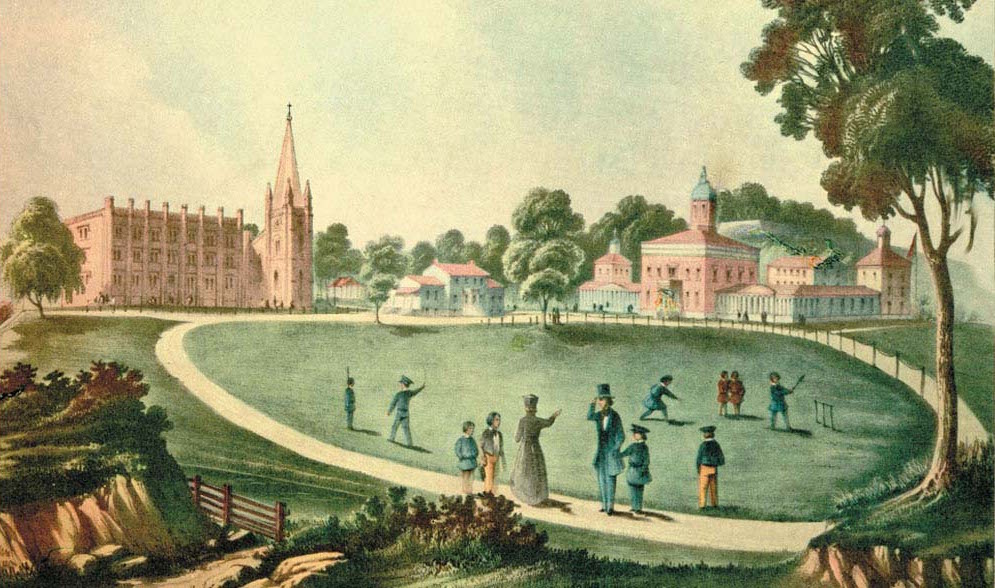
St. John's College, 1846

The college received its charter from the New York State Legislature in 1846, and the first Jesuits began to arrive about three months later. In the same year Hughes sold St. John's College to the Jesuits for $40,000. Hughes deeded the college over but retained title to the seminary property, which totaled about nine acres. In 1847, Fordham's first school in Manhattan opened. The school became the independently chartered College of St. Francis Xavier in 1861. It was also in 1847 that the American poet Edgar Allan Poe arrived in the village of Fordham and began a friendship with the college Jesuits that would last throughout his life. In 1849, he published his famed work The Bells. Some traditions credit the college's church bells as the inspiration for this poem. Poe also spent considerable time in the college's library, and even occasionally stayed overnight.

St. John's curriculum consisted of a junior division (which would become Fordham Prep), requiring four years of study in Latin, Greek, grammar, literature, history, geography, mathematics, and religion; and a senior division (i.e. the college), requiring three years study in "poetry" (humanities), rhetoric, and philosophy. Colonel Robert Gould Shaw, famed commander of the all-black 54th Massachusetts Volunteer Infantry American Civil War regiment, attended the junior division. An Artium Baccalaureus degree was earned for completion of both curricula, and an additional year of philosophy would earn a Magister Artium degree. There was also a "commercial" track similar to a modern business school, offered as an alternative to the Classical curriculum and resulting in a certificate instead of a degree. In 1855, the first student stage production, Henry IV, was presented by the St. John's Dramatic Society. The seminary was closed in 1859.

The Civil War was a significant time for the college; among its alumni were four generals, six colonels (including Shaw), and five captains serving in the Union Army; twelve men from Fordham also served in the Confederate Army. Three Jesuits from St. John's served as army chaplains. Lincoln's assassination deeply affected the student body, and even southern students attending the college mourned his loss.

Fordham's baseball team, which played its first game on September 13, 1859, made several contributions to the history of baseball in the nineteenth century, and played a key role in introducing the game to Cuba and Latin America. On November 3, 1859, Fordham played the first college baseball game with modern nine-man teams against the now-defunct St. Francis Xavier College in Manhattan. Fordham won the game 33–11. Steve Bellán, the first Cuban and Latin American to play major league baseball, learned the game while a student at Fordham from 1863 to 1868. After playing for several American major league teams, he returned home and played in the first organized baseball game in Cuba on December 27, 1874. Charles, Henry, and Frederick Zaldo, brothers from Havana who founded the Almendares Baseball Club, one of the three original Cuban baseball teams, also learned the game while attending Fordham from 1875 to 1878.

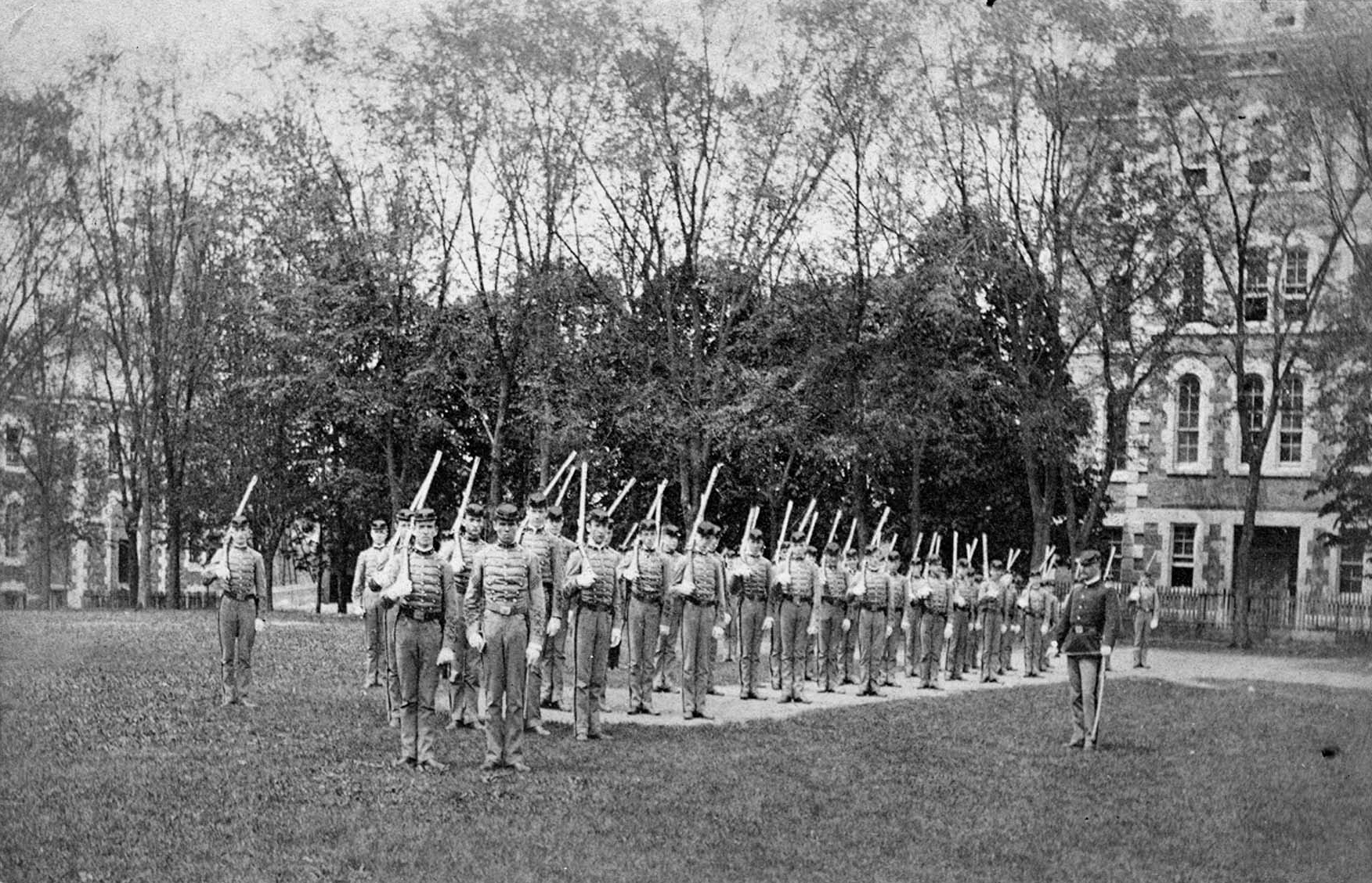
Lt. Herbert C. Squires with the Fordham cadet corps, April 1886

An Act of Congress created instruction in military science and tactics at the college level. As a result of the act, St. John's brought a cadet corps to campus. From 1885 to 1890, Lt. Herbert C. Squires—a veteran of the 7th U.S. Cavalry—built a cadet battalion to a strength of 200, which would provide the foundation for the modern ROTC unit at Fordham. The college built a science building in 1886, lending more legitimacy to science in the curriculum. In addition, a three-year Bachelor of Science degree was created. In 1897, academic regalia for students at commencement was first adopted.

=== 1901–1950: Maturation ===
On June 21, 1904, the Regents of the University of the State of New York consented to allow the board of trustees to authorize the opening of a law school and a medical school. St. John's College officially became Fordham University on March 7, 1907. The name Fordham refers to the village of Fordham, in which the original Rose Hill campus is located. The village, in turn, drew its name from its location near a shallow crossing of the Bronx River ("ford by the hamlet"). When Fordham and several other Westchester County towns were consolidated into Bronx County at the turn of the twentieth century, the village became the borough's Fordham neighborhood. Still in existence today, it is just to the west of the Rose Hill campus.

In 1908, Fordham University Press was established. In 1912, the university opened the College of Pharmacy, which offered a three-year program in pharmacy, not requiring its students to obtain bachelor's degrees until the late 1930s. The college had a mainly Jewish student body, and in recognition of that, the students were exempted from Catholic theology instruction. In September 1912, the Swiss psychiatrist and psychoanalyst Carl Jung delivered a series of lectures at Fordham; these lectures marked his historic break with the theories of his colleague, Sigmund Freud.

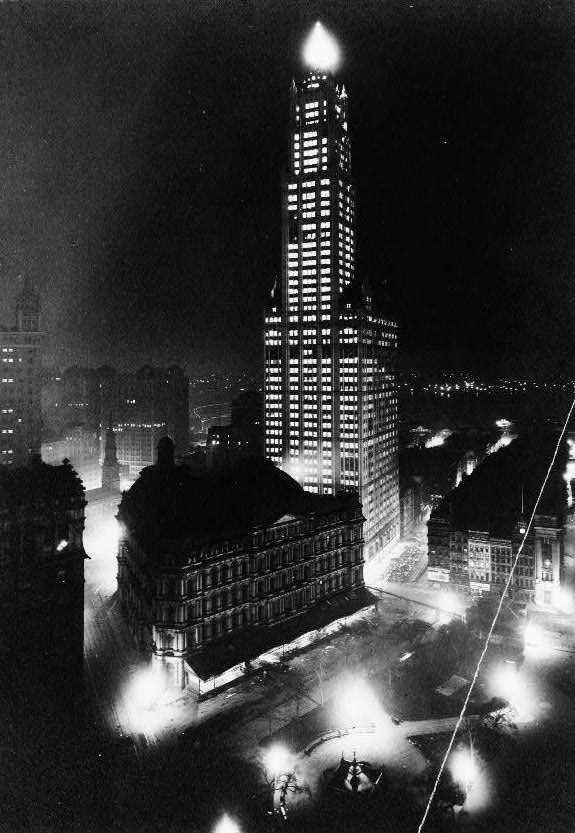
Woolworth Building 1913, site of City Hall campus

The College of St. Francis Xavier was closed in 1913, and various Fordham colleges were opened at the Woolworth Building in Manhattan to fill the void. Some divisions of the university including the law school were later moved to the City Hall Campus at "the Vincent Astor Building" at 302 Broadway. This commenced an unbroken string of instruction in Manhattan that became what is now Fordham College at Lincoln Center, where all of Fordham's academic operations in Manhattan are centered today.

Entrance to the City Hall Division at the Vincent Astor Building c. 1965

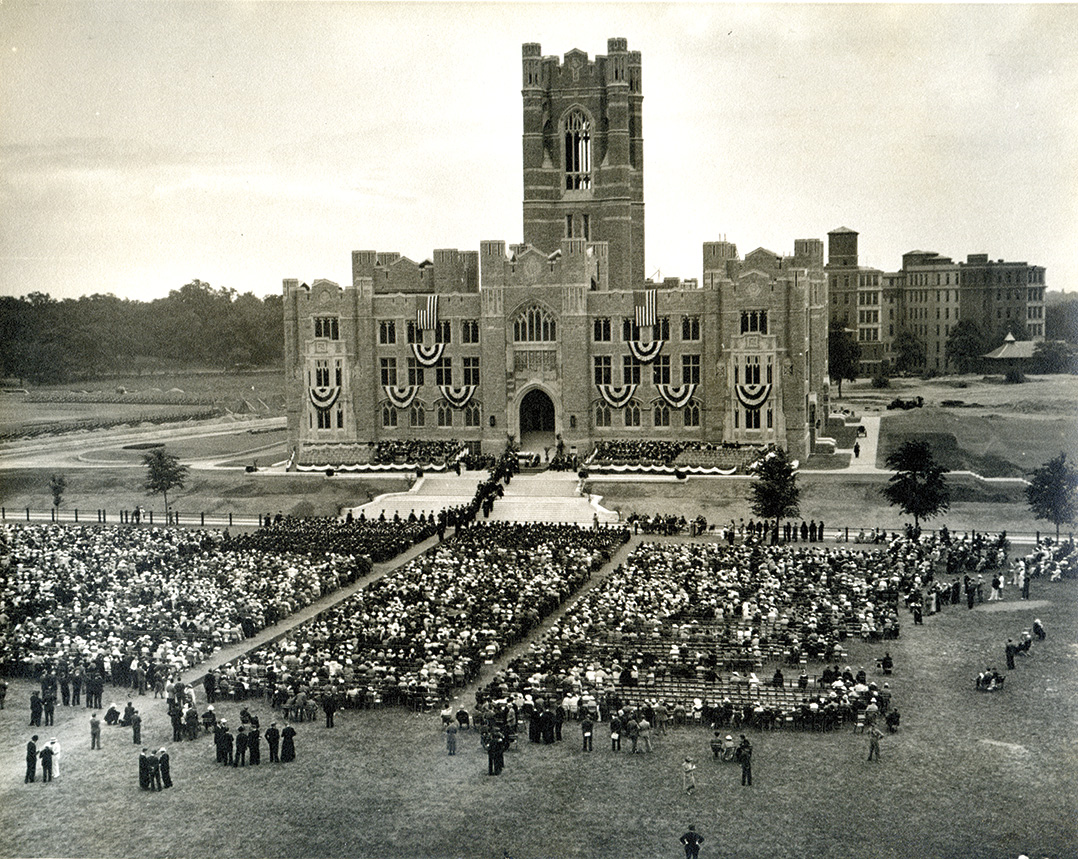
First commencement ceremony before recently completed Keating Hall, June 10, 1936

The university closed its medical school in 1919, citing a lack of endowment and reduced university funds overall due to the First World War. The Gabelli School of Business began in 1920 in Manhattan as the School of Accounting. According to a university catalogue from 1920, the annual cost for tuition, room and board at the college was $600 (equivalent to $9,643 in 2025). In 1944, the School of Professional and Continuing Studies was established, largely bolstered by returning veterans taking advantage of the GI Bill.

The football program was established in 1882 and gained national renown in the early 20th century. Fordham football played on some of the largest stages in sports, including games in front of sellout crowds at the Polo Grounds and Yankee Stadium, a Cotton Bowl appearance and a Sugar Bowl victory. The program produced the famed Seven Blocks of Granite, one of whom was the great Vince Lombardi. On September 30, 1939, Fordham participated in an early televised football game, defeating Waynesburg College, 34–7. The university discontinued the program during World War II, reinstating it in 1946. However, it proved much less successful and too expensive to maintain, and was again discontinued in 1954, though would revive yet again as an NCAA Division III team in 1970 and Division I team in 1989.

=== 1951–2000: Clerical independence ===
On February 15, 1958, then-Senator John F. Kennedy received an honorary Doctor of Law degree from university president Laurence J. McGinley and delivered an address at the annual Fordham Law Alumni Association luncheon. After humorously stating that he denied any "presidential aspirations—with respect to the Fordham Alumni Association," Kennedy said that, "It is to the eternal credit of Fordham that the teaching of law has here been accompanied by an inculcation of moral values. The graduate of this law school has acquired something more than the tools of his profession—he has learned, both by example and precept, the high obligations of trust which are his as an attorney."

In 1961, the Lincoln Center campus opened as part of the Lincoln Square Renewal Project. This second campus which placed an institution of higher learning in the realm of a multi-disciplinary performing arts complex came to pass through the collaboration of New York City's urban planner Robert Moses and Fordham's twenty sixth president Laurence J. McGinley. The School of Law was the first to occupy the new campus, but the academic programs at 302 Broadway were moved to the new location in 1969.

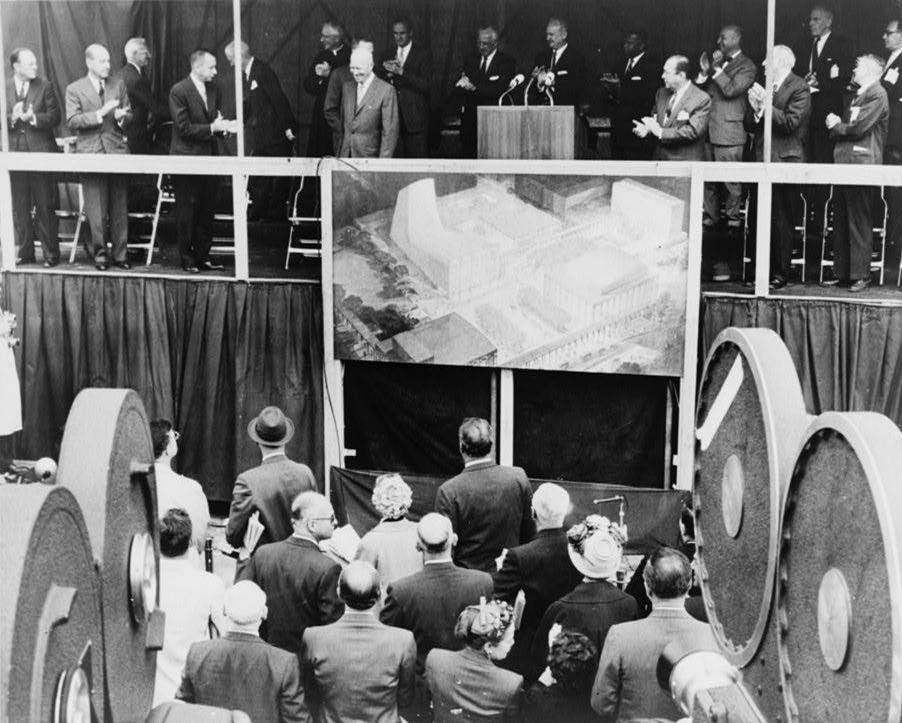
President Dwight D. Eisenhower at the launching of Lincoln Center campus, 1959

In addition, on November 18, 1961, Attorney General Robert F. Kennedy received an honorary degree and delivered an address at the dedication of the new Fordham Law School building in Lincoln Center, paying tribute to "Fordham ideals, traditions and teachers." Kennedy said that he was privileged, as attorney general, to be "the largest single employer of Fordham law graduates in North America," and also remarked that, "While the world we know is preoccupied by what may lie before it, when threats could pervade our every thought and fears our every action, it is reassuring to see buildings and programs like these rise each day to greet the future. It is a mark of courage and resolution." On November 2, 1964, during his campaign for the U.S. Senate, Robert F. Kennedy made another visit to Fordham and gave an address at the Rose Hill gymnasium that attracted a crowd of 2,800.

The first women to attend Fordham came earlier in the century: the Law School began accepting female students in 1918. Women also had been earning Fordham degrees at the Graduate School of Social Service and the Undergraduate School of Education, at the City Hall Campus. Women in the School of Education had also been commuting to the Rose Hill campus to take their science lab courses alongside male students, where women had also been part of the School of Pharmacy's student body. However, in September 1964, the all-female Thomas More College at the Rose Hill campus began instruction for the BA and BS degrees.

In response to internal demands for a more "liberalized" curriculum, the university created Bensalem College in 1967. An experimental college with no set requirements and no grades, it was studied by a wide array of educators and covered by journalists at such large-circulation publications of the day as Look, Esquire and the Saturday Review. The school closed in 1974.

"The Liberal Arts College" for undergraduates opened in 1968, later changing its name to "The College at Lincoln Center" and then in 1996 to "Fordham College at Lincoln Center." In 1993, a twenty-story residence hall for 850 students was added to the Lincoln Center campus.

In the late 1950s, the Civil Rights Movement was gathering momentum in the U.S. when Fordham students and school officials expressed ambivalence about racial justice. In the late 1960s, Fordham became a center of political activism and countercultural activity. At the Rose Hill Campus, the Fordham branch of Students for a Democratic Society organized opposition to the existence of the ROTC and military recruiters. During this period, students routinely organized protests and class boycotts and used psychoactive drugs on campus open spaces. In 1969, students organized a sit-in on the main road leading to Rose Hill in response to an announcement that President Richard Nixon would be speaking on campus. As a result of the sit-in, Nixon was forced to cancel his plans to speak. A year later, students stormed the main administration building, occupying it for several weeks, and set fire to the Rose Hill faculty lounge. It was during this period of activism that the university's African and African American Studies Department, one of the first black studies departments in the nation, as well as the paper, the leftist student newspaper on campus, were founded.

The board of trustees was reorganized in 1969 to include a majority of nonclerical members, which officially made the university an independent institution. While the Jesuit order thereby lost full control of Fordham, the board of trustees continues to maintain the institution as a "Jesuit, Catholic university." The College of Pharmacy closed in 1972 due to declining enrollment. Fordham College at Rose Hill became coeducational in 1974 when it merged with Thomas More College.

Fordham Preparatory School is a four-year, all-male college preparatory school that was once integrated with the university, sharing its 1841 founding. "Fordham Prep" became legally independent in 1972 when it moved to its own facilities on the northwest corner of the Rose Hill campus. The school continues to retain many connections with the university.

=== 2001–present: Post-millennium ===
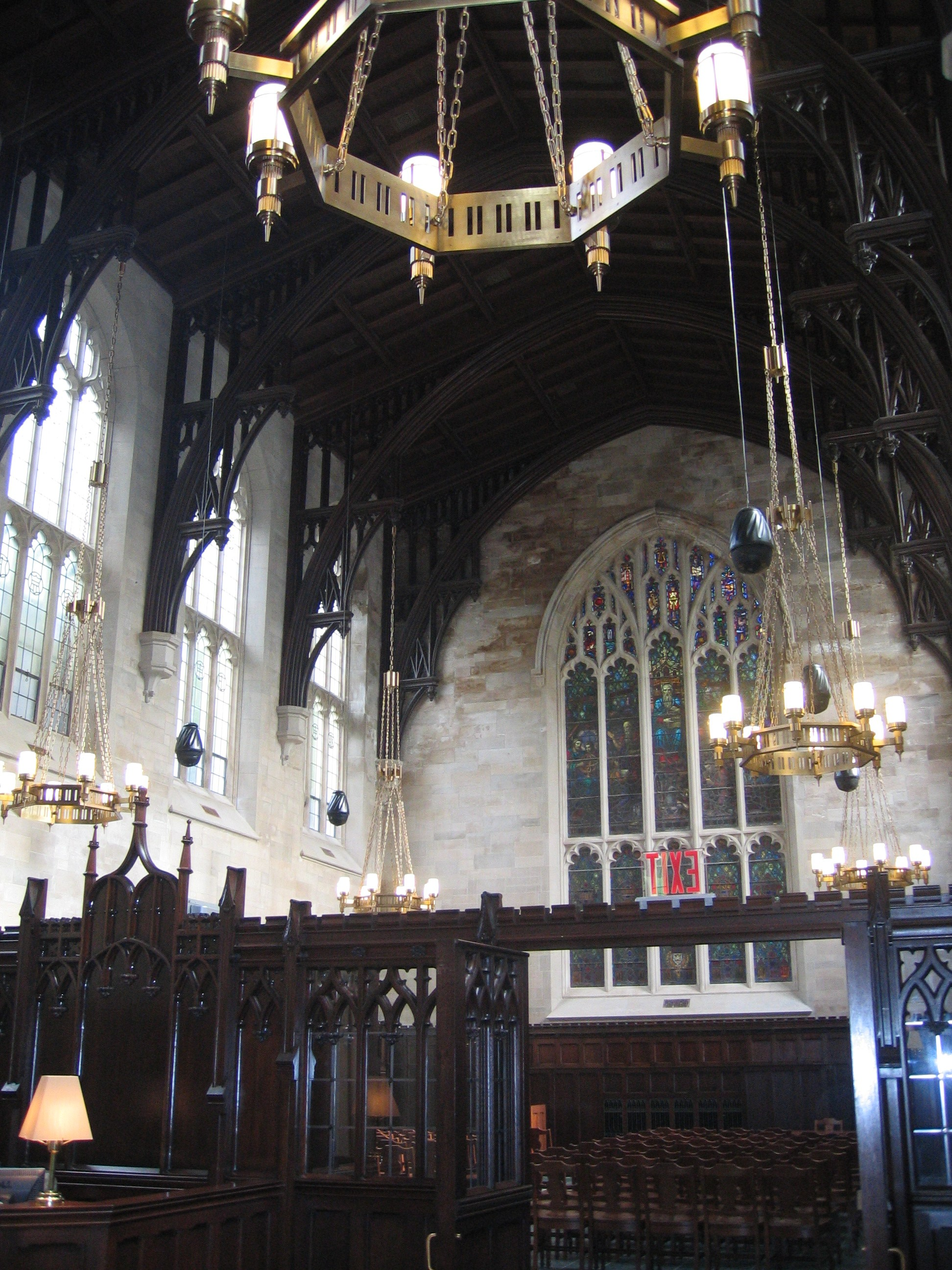
Duane Library at the Rose Hill campus, 2004

Marymount College was an independent women's college that was founded in 1907 by the Religious of the Sacred Heart of Mary. The school was consolidated into Fordham in July 2002. Marymount had been steeped in financial hardship since the 1970s. Located 25 miles (40 km) north of Manhattan in Tarrytown, New York, the college remained open as a single-sex institution, and its campus received a branch of the School of Professional and Continuing Studies as well as extensions of the graduate schools for education, social service, and business administration.

In 2005, Fordham announced that its Marymount College campus would be phased out; Marymount awarded degrees to its final undergraduate class in May 2007. University administrators indicated the campus would remain open for Fordham graduate programs in several disciplines.

In the autumn of 2007, the university announced its intention to seek buyers for the Marymount campus. Administrators stated the expenses required to support the programs at the campus far exceeded the demand. University officials estimated the revenue gained from the proposed sale would not be greater than the expenses incurred maintaining and improving the campus since the merger with Marymount. President McShane stated the university's decision was nonetheless a "painful" one. Fordham then indicated its intention to move the remaining programs from the Marymount campus to a new location in Harrison, New York, by the autumn of 2008. On February 17, 2008, the university announced the sale of the campus for $27 million to EF Schools, a chain of private language-instruction schools.

In 2014, the university successfully completed a five-year, $500 million campaign; the project surpassed expectations by raising more than $540 million. The university went on to renovate and expand its Lincoln Center campus, opening in 2014 its renovated Law School, as well as an additional undergraduate dormitory, McKeon Hall. The former law school building was converted to expand Quinn Library and house the Gabelli School of Business. Long-term plans include a new library building and buildings for the graduate schools of Social Service and of Education.

== Campuses ==
Map of Fordham's two campuses in New York City

Fordham has three main campuses, which are in and around New York City: Rose Hill in the Fordham neighborhood, the Bronx, adjacent to Bronx Park on Fordham Road; Lincoln Center in Manhattan, one block from Central Park; and Westchester in West Harrison, New York. In addition, it maintains and utilizes various academic, extracurricular, and residential facilities throughout New York City and New York State and around the world. In addition to its three main campuses, the university also operates the Louis Calder Center, a biological field station 25 miles (40 km) north of New York City in Armonk, New York. It consists of 114 acres (0.46 km^{2}) forested with a 10-acre (4.0 ha) lake and 13 buildings. The structures house laboratories and classrooms, offices for faculty and administrators, a library, and residences.

Outside the United States, the university maintains a small campus in London, known as the London Centre. In addition, Fordham operates field offices in Granada, Spain, and Pretoria, South Africa; these house undergraduate study abroad programs. Finally, the university provides faculty for the Beijing International MBA at Peking University at Peking University in China. The program, established in 1998, has been ranked No. 1 in China by Fortune and Forbes Magazines.

=== Rose Hill ===
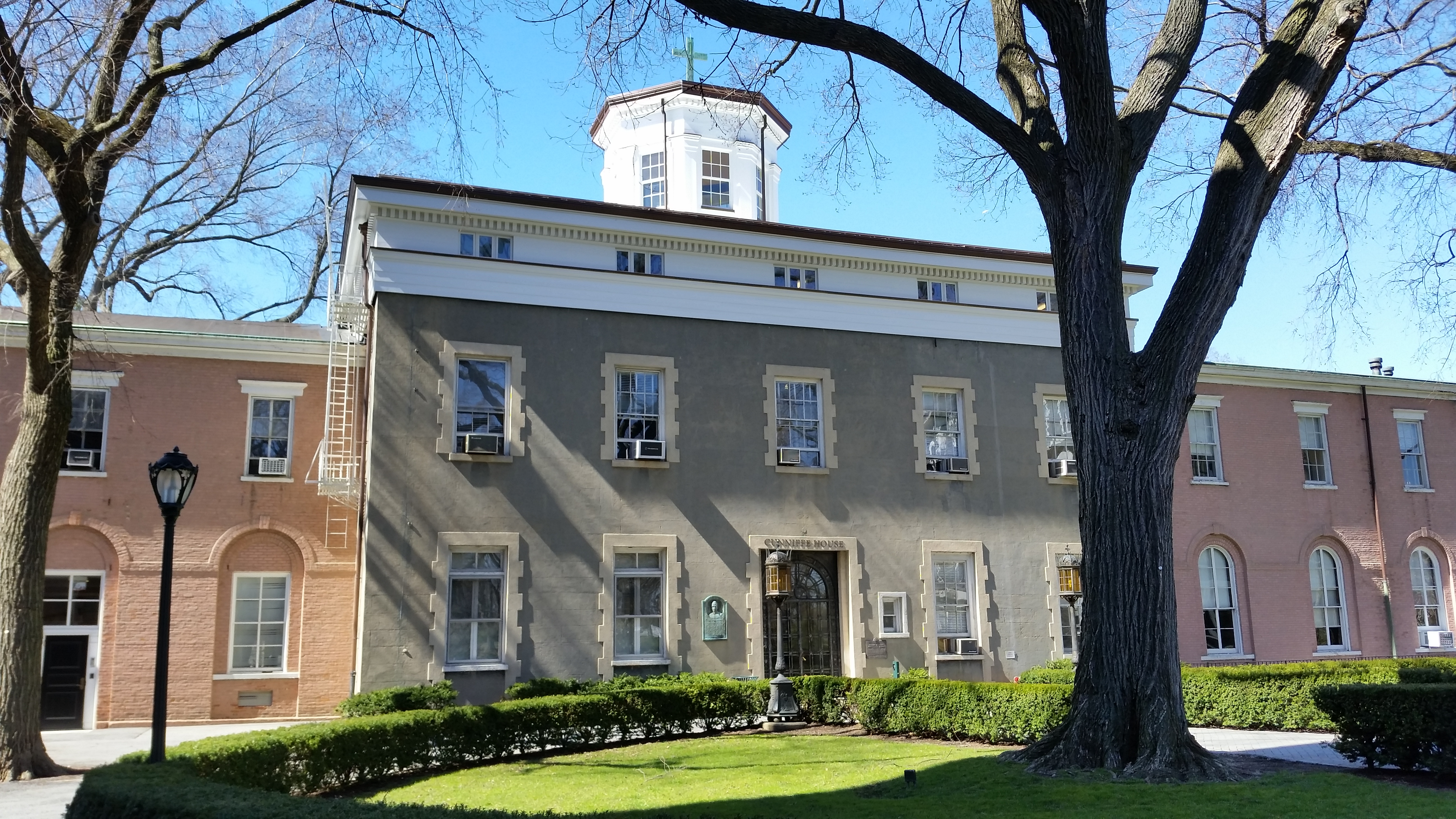
Cunniffe House, the administration building at Rose Hill, constructed in 1838 and one of the oldest buildings on campus

The Rose Hill campus, established in 1841 by Bishop John Hughes, is home to Fordham College at Rose Hill, the Gabelli School of Business, and a division of the School of Professional and Continuing Studies, as well as the Graduate Schools of Arts and Sciences and Religion and Religious Education. Situated on 85 acres (34.4 ha) in the central Bronx, it is among the largest privately owned green spaces in New York City. At one time spanning over 100 acres, much of the land for adjacent Bronx Park was acquired from the university with funds authorized by the 1884 New Parks Act intended to preserve lands that would soon become part of New York City, on the condition that it be used as a zoo and botanical garden. Fordham students and staff have free admission to the garden grounds. Rose Hill is on Fordham Road, just north of the Belmont neighborhood, described as the "real Little Italy of New York", and immediately west of the Bronx Zoo and the New York Botanical Garden. The campus's Collegiate Gothic architecture, expansive lawns, ivy-covered buildings, and cobblestone streets were featured by NBC News.

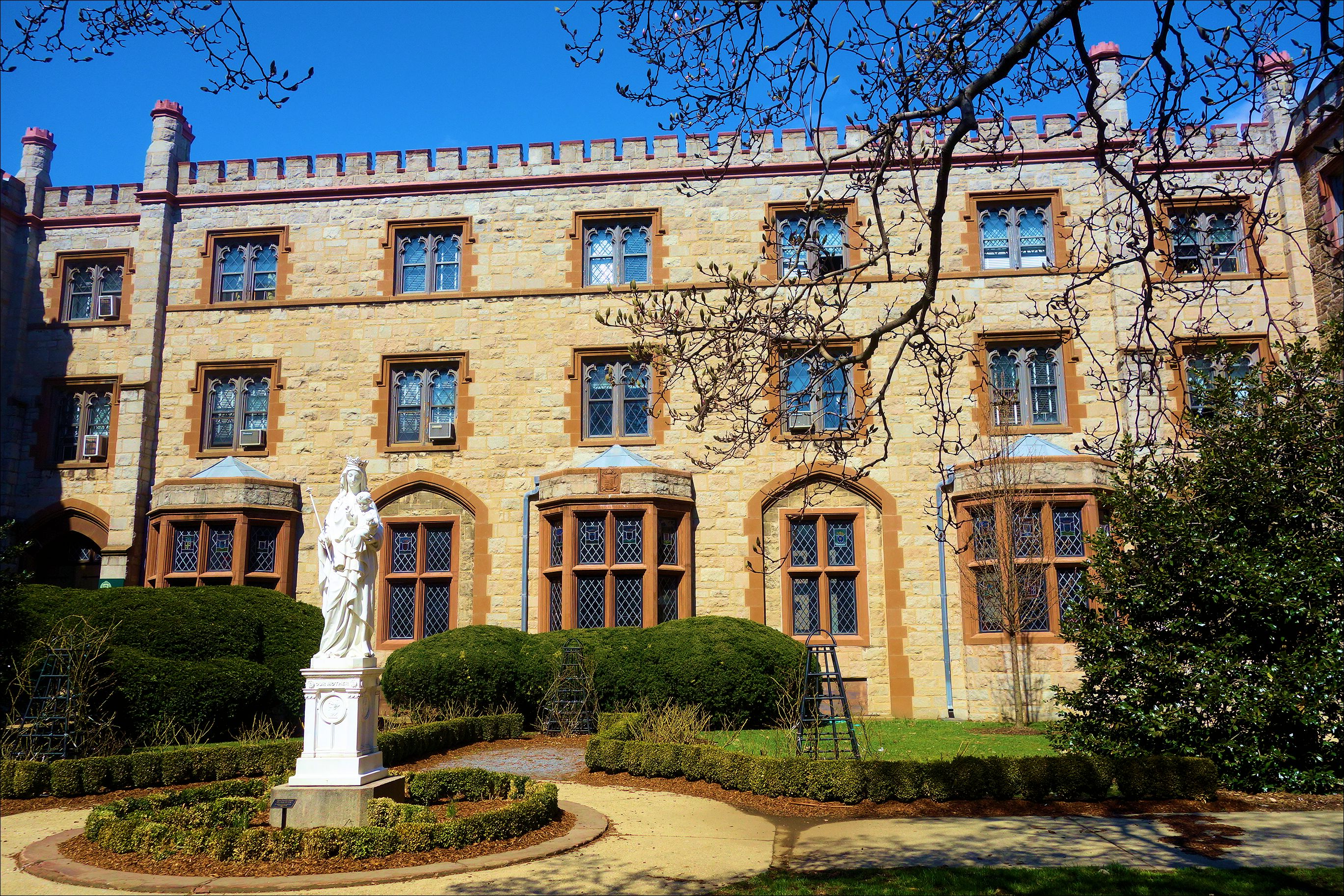
Queen's Court Residential College, Rose Hill

Rose Hill is largely made up of nineteenth-century architecture, with some contemporary buildings. The campus is home to several structures on the National Register of Historic Places, such as the University Church built in 1845 as a seminary chapel and parish church for the surrounding community. It contains the old altar from the current St. Patrick's Cathedral, as well as stained glass windows given to the university by King Louis Philippe I of France. The windows are particularly notable for their connection to a workshop in Sevres, France, locus of the earliest stages of the Gothic Revival. Adjacent to the church is a 138-plot cemetery where the university's nineteenth-century Jesuits, diocesan seminarians, students, and workers are interred, relocated in 1890 from its original location at today's New York Botanical Garden.

There are eleven residence halls on campus, including Queen's Court residential college, whose main mission is to "assist in the integration of first-year students into University life," and nine Integrated Learning Communities that each cater to a particular year (freshman, sophomore, etc.) or area of study (science, leadership, etc.). In addition, the campus contains two residences for Jesuits, a retirement home, and the Murray-Weigel infirmary.

Rose Hill is served by the Fordham station of the Metro-North Railroad, which extends to Grand Central Terminal. Public transit buses stop adjacent to campus exits, and three New York City Subway stations are within walking distance. The university also provides a shuttle service between its three main campuses (the "Ram Van"), which is headquartered at Rose Hill. 6,981 undergraduate and graduate students are enrolled at the Rose Hill, of which 2,482 live on campus.

=== Lincoln Center ===
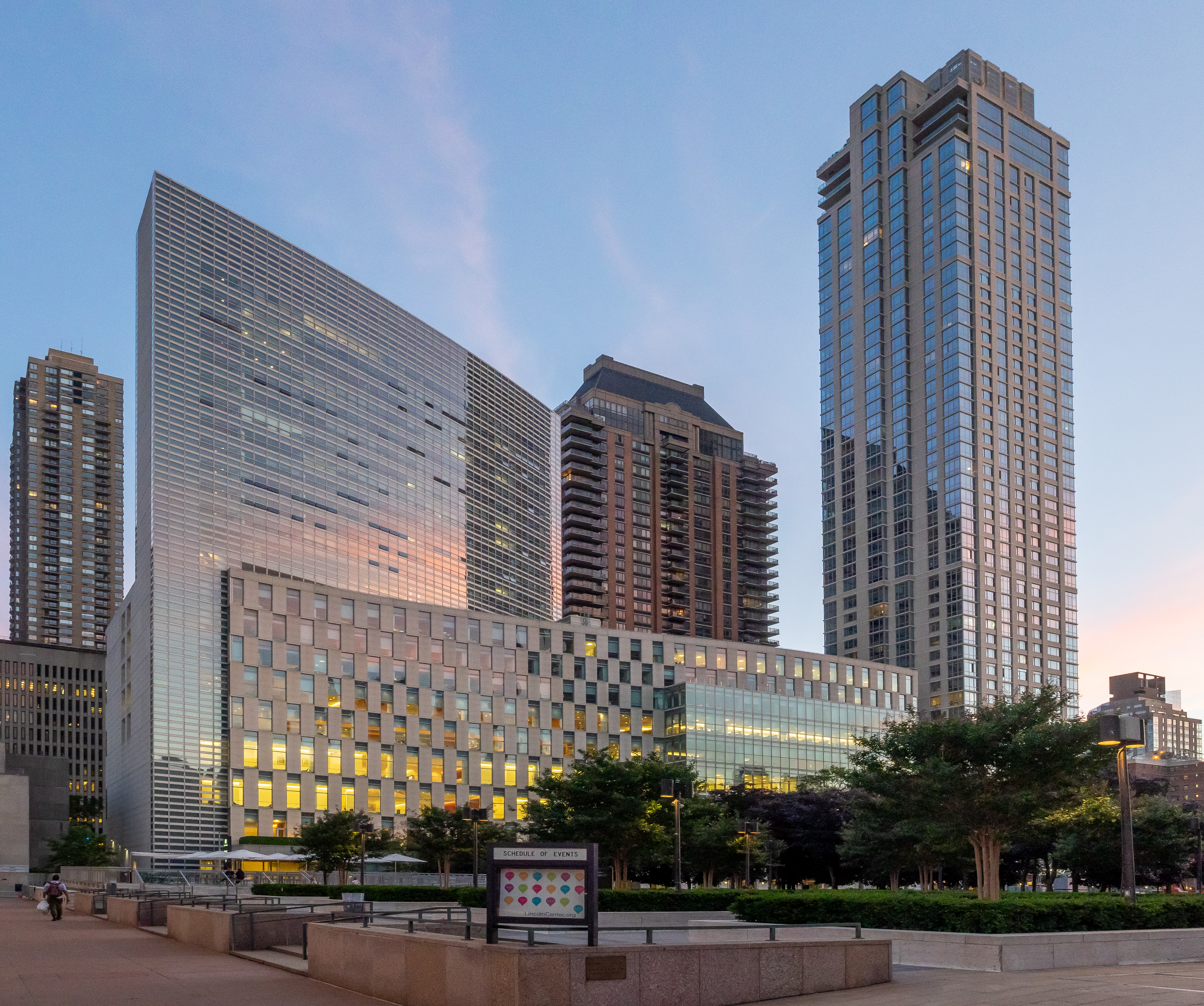
View of the School of Law at Lincoln Center

In 1954, New York City's Robert Moses wrote to Fordham administrators proposing Fordham might "be interested in an alternative [to renting space in the New York Coliseum] involving a new building in a part of the area to the north of Columbus Circle to be redeveloped under Title One of the Federal Housing Law. ... If this idea appeals to you I will ask Mr. Lebwohl to see you and explain it in greater detail." In March 1958, Mayor Robert Wagner signed the deeds transferring the Lincoln Center campus to Fordham University.

The Lincoln Center campus is home to Fordham College at Lincoln Center and to a division of the School of Professional and Continuing Studies, as well as the School of Law, the Graduate Schools of Education and Social Service, and the Gabelli School of Business. The 8-acre (3.2 ha) campus occupies the area from West 60th Street to West 62nd Street between Columbus and Amsterdam Avenues, placing it in the cultural heart of Manhattan.

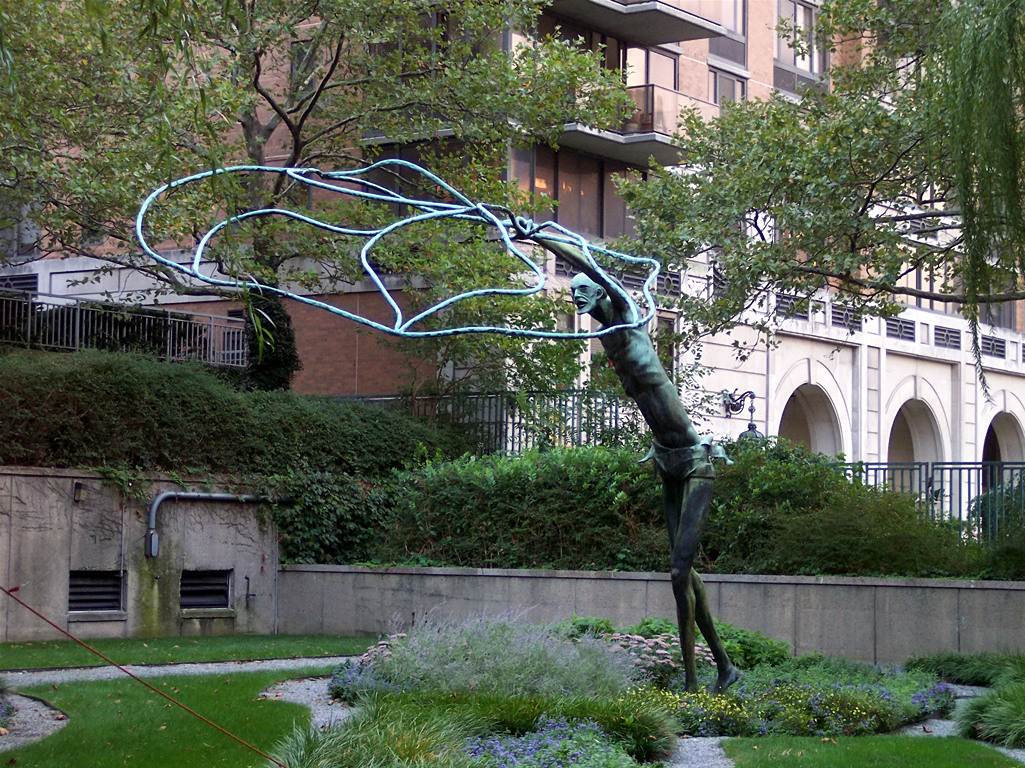
Peter, Fisher of Men statue

Lincoln Center has two grassy plazas, built one level up from the street. The larger expanse was once a barren cement landscape known as "Robert Moses Plaza;" the smaller is known as "St. Peter's Garden" and contains a memorial to the Fordham students and alumni who perished in the September 11, 2001, attacks. The campus is served by public transit buses; the A, B, C, D, and 1 Subway trains, which are accessed at the 59th Street/Columbus Circle station; and the university's Ram Van shuttle. 9,078 undergraduate and postgraduate students are enrolled at Lincoln Center, of which 1,337 reside in University housing. The campus consists of the Leon Lowenstein Building, McMahon Hall, the Gerald M. Quinn Library, and the Doyle Building. In the fall of 2014, the new freshman residence dormitory McKeon Hall opened, along with the new Fordham Law School building.

The Toward 2016 Strategic Plan prescribed a complete reconfiguration of the Lincoln Center campus, to be completed by 2032. The first phase of the project, including renovations of the Lowenstein Building as well as a new Law School building and residence hall designed by Pei Cobb Freed & Partners, were completed in 2014. In 2014, Fordham University purchased a building at 45 Columbus Avenue and incorporated it in its Lincoln Center campus as Joseph A. Martino Hall. The nine-story building is directly across the avenue from the former Law School building.

=== Westchester ===
The Westchester campus is home to divisions of the School of Professional and Continuing Studies, the Martino Graduate School of Business Administration, and the Education and Social Service graduate schools. It consists of a three-story, 62,500-square-foot (5,810 m^{2}) building on 32 acres (12.9 ha) landscaped with a stream and pond. Fordham signed a 20-year lease for the facility, which includes 26 "smart" classrooms, faculty and administrative offices, a media center, a food service facility, and indoor and outdoor meeting areas. In 2008, the university spent over $8 million renovating the building in order to increase its sustainability.

The campus is served by the White Plains station of the Metro-North Railroad 4 miles (6 km) away and connected by the Westchester County Bus System ("The Bee Line").

=== London Centre ===
In October 2018, Fordham expanded its study abroad program in London to its own space, the London Centre. The campus is situated in the Clerkenwell area of London, within the London borough of Camden. Fordham's London Centre offers programs in business, theater, and the liberal arts to students from Fordham and other colleges and universities.

=== Town-gown relationships ===
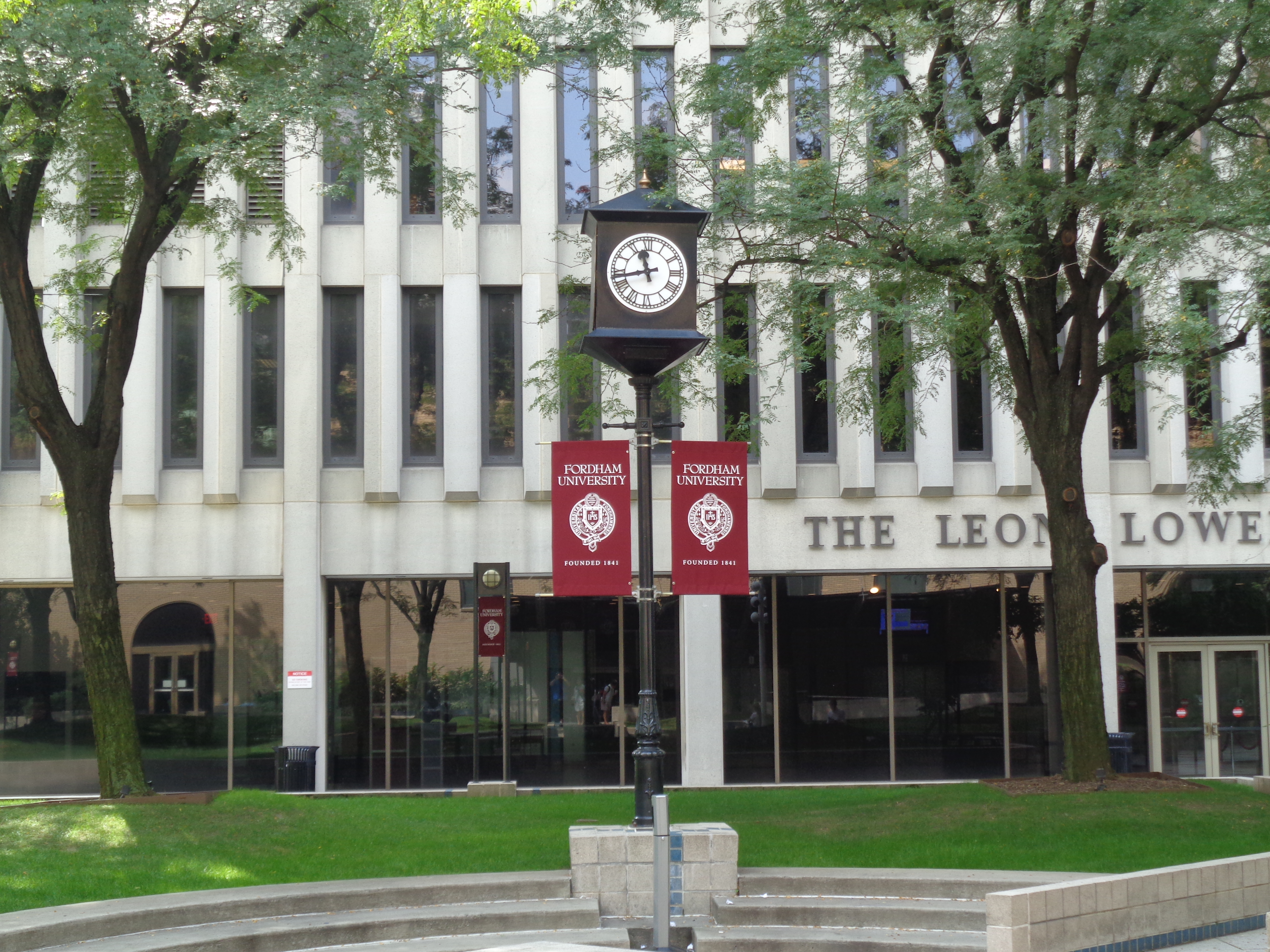
Robert Moses plaza at Lincoln Center

Relations between Fordham and its surrounding neighborhoods vary according to campus. At Rose Hill, the university actively recruits Bronx students from disadvantaged backgrounds through the New York State Higher Education Opportunity Program. In addition, about 80% of students participate in local community service.

The relationship between the Lincoln Center campus and some of the Upper West Side community residents have been strained, over campus development. In 2010 the New York State Supreme Court dismissed a lawsuit against Fordham brought by The Alfred Condominium. The suit was filed in response to the university's expansion plans at Lincoln Center and their expected visual and auditory impact on the surrounding community. The Lincoln Center campus does, however, have a lively connection to the artistic scene in Manhattan through its dance and theater productions and visual art exhibitions.

== Academics ==
| School | Founded |
|---|---|
| Fordham College (Rose Hill) | 1841 |
| School of Law | 1905 |
| Fordham College (Lincoln Center) | 1913 |
| Graduate School of Arts and Sciences | 1916 |
| Graduate School of Education | 1916 |
| Graduate School of Social Service | 1916 |
| Gabelli School of Business | 1920 |
| School of Professional and Continuing Studies | 1944 |
| Graduate School of Religion and Religious Education | 1969 |

Fordham University is composed of four undergraduate and six graduate schools, and its academic ethos is heavily drawn from its Jesuit origins. The university promotes the Jesuit principles of cura personalis, which fosters a faculty and administrative respect for the individual student and all of his or her gifts and abilities; magis, which encourages students to challenge themselves and strive for excellence in their lives; and homines pro aliis, which intends to inspire service, a universal charity, among members of the Fordham community. (Note: Fordham has been governed by a lay board of trustees since 1969, when it ceased being directly governed by the Society of Jesus. However, the university maintains its official Jesuit, Catholic affiliation and a curriculum in accordance with Jesuit educational principles, specifically cura personalis, and each of its presidents since 1846 have been Jesuit priests. The university's Jesuit academic ethos privileges the liberal arts as a basis of education.)

Through its International and Study Abroad Programs (ISAP) Office, Fordham provides its students with over 130 different study abroad opportunities. The programs range in duration from six weeks to a full academic year and vary in focus from cultural and language immersion to internship and service learning. Some of the programs are organized by Fordham itself, such as those in London, United Kingdom; Granada, Spain; and Pretoria, South Africa; while others are operated by partner institutions like Georgetown University, the University of Oxford, and the Council on International Educational Exchange (CIEE). In addition to the ISAP programs, the university's constituent schools offer a range of study abroad programs that cater to their specific areas of study. Fordham has produced 168 Fulbright scholars since 2003.

=== Admissions ===
Undergraduate applicant statistics
| | 2023 | 2024 | 2025 | 2026 (Note: Preliminary admission statistics; enrollment statistics will be updated after the May 1 deposit deadline.) |
|---|---|---|---|---|
| Applicants | 43,633 | 43,330 | 43,640 | 54,000+ |
| Admits | 24,546 | 25,689 | 25,207 | |
| Admit rate | 56% | 59% | 58% | 47% |
| Enrolled | 2,401 | 2,475 | 2,478 | |

According to U.S. News & World Report, Fordham is considered a "more selective" university, while a 2013 Barron's survey published in the New York Times classed the university as "highly competitive". In its 2018 edition, admissions selectivity to Fordham's undergraduate schools received a reclassification by Barron's Profiles of American Colleges to "Most Competitive" after being "Highly Competitive+" in its 2017 edition, and reported 74% of enrolled freshmen as ranking in the top 20% of their high school class.

In 2016, the university accepted approximately 43% of all applicants across both its undergraduate and graduate programs. For the undergraduate class of 2019, Fordham accepted 20,366 of the 42,811 applicants (47.6%) and enrolled 2,211. The middle 50% range of SAT scores for enrolled freshmen was 580–670 for critical reading, 590–680 for math, and 590–680 for writing, while the ACT Composite middle 50% range was 28–33. The average high school GPA of incoming freshmen was 3.64.

=== Undergraduate curriculum ===
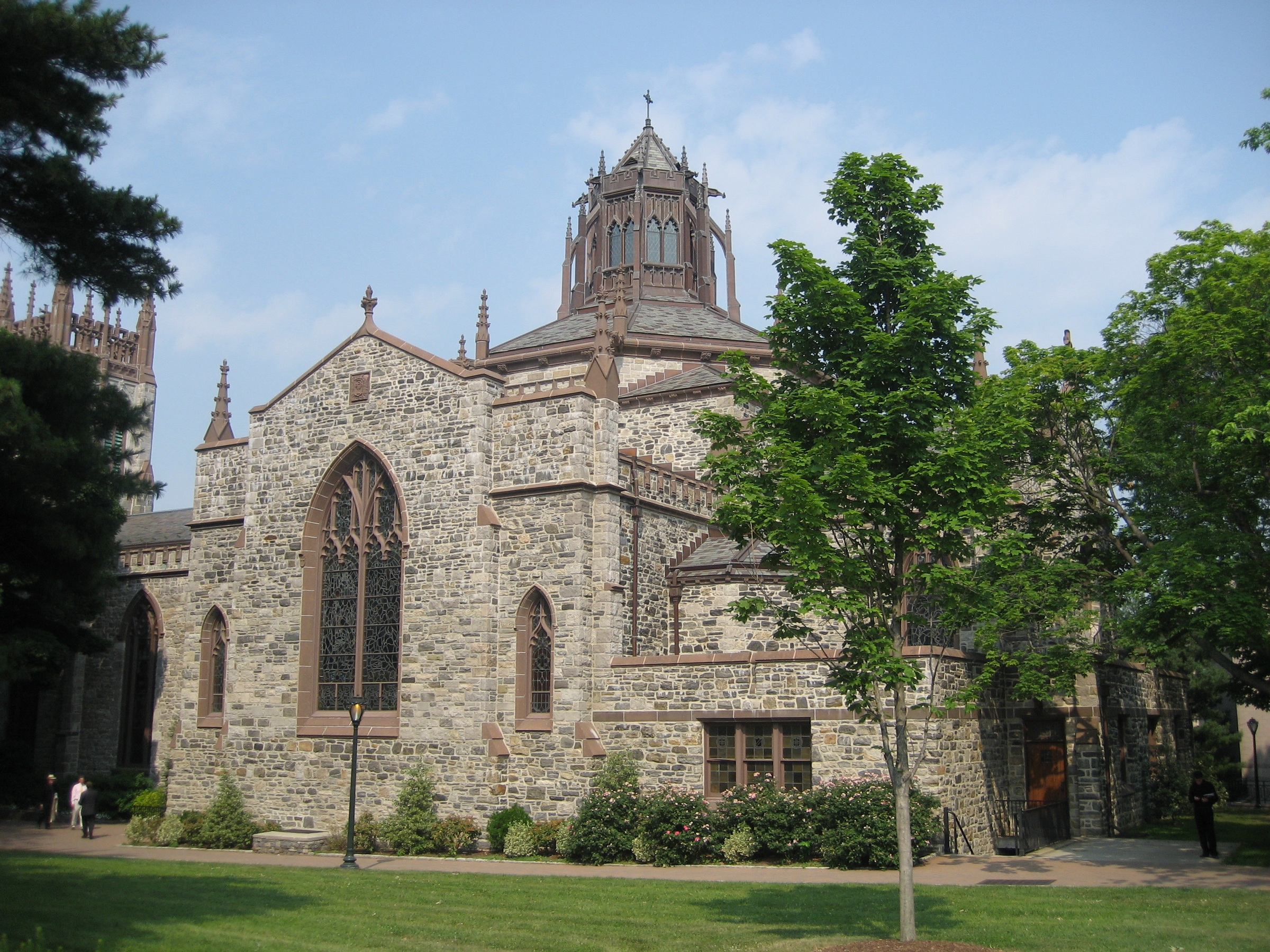
Fordham University Church, Rose Hill, viewed from the northeast

All undergraduates pursuing bachelor's degrees at Fordham are required to complete the Core curriculum, a distribution of 17 courses in nine disciplines: English, mathematical/computational reasoning, social science, philosophy and ethics, history, fine arts, religious studies, natural science, and modern or Classical languages. Based on the curriculum established by the Society of Jesus in the sixteenth century, the Core is shared by Jesuit schools all over the world and emphasizes the liberal arts as a basis of education.

Undergraduate students are expected to have finished most of the core requirements as a sophomore; a wide variety of courses can be applied to satisfy the requirements. Upon the completion of the Core Curriculum, students choose from approximately 50 major courses of study, in which they will receive their degree. One option is the "personalized interdisciplinary major", which allows students to create their own course of study across various disciplines.

In addition to the bachelor's degrees offered to undergraduates, the university also offers specialized academic programs, including pre-medical and health professions; pre-professional programs in architecture, law, and criminal justice; a 3-2 engineering program, in conjunction with Columbia and Case Western Reserve universities; a five-year teacher certification program; an Applied Public Accountancy (CPA certification) program; a BFA program in dance, in conjunction with the Alvin Ailey American Dance Theater; as well as cross-registration opportunities with the Juilliard School for advanced music students.

=== Graduate programs ===
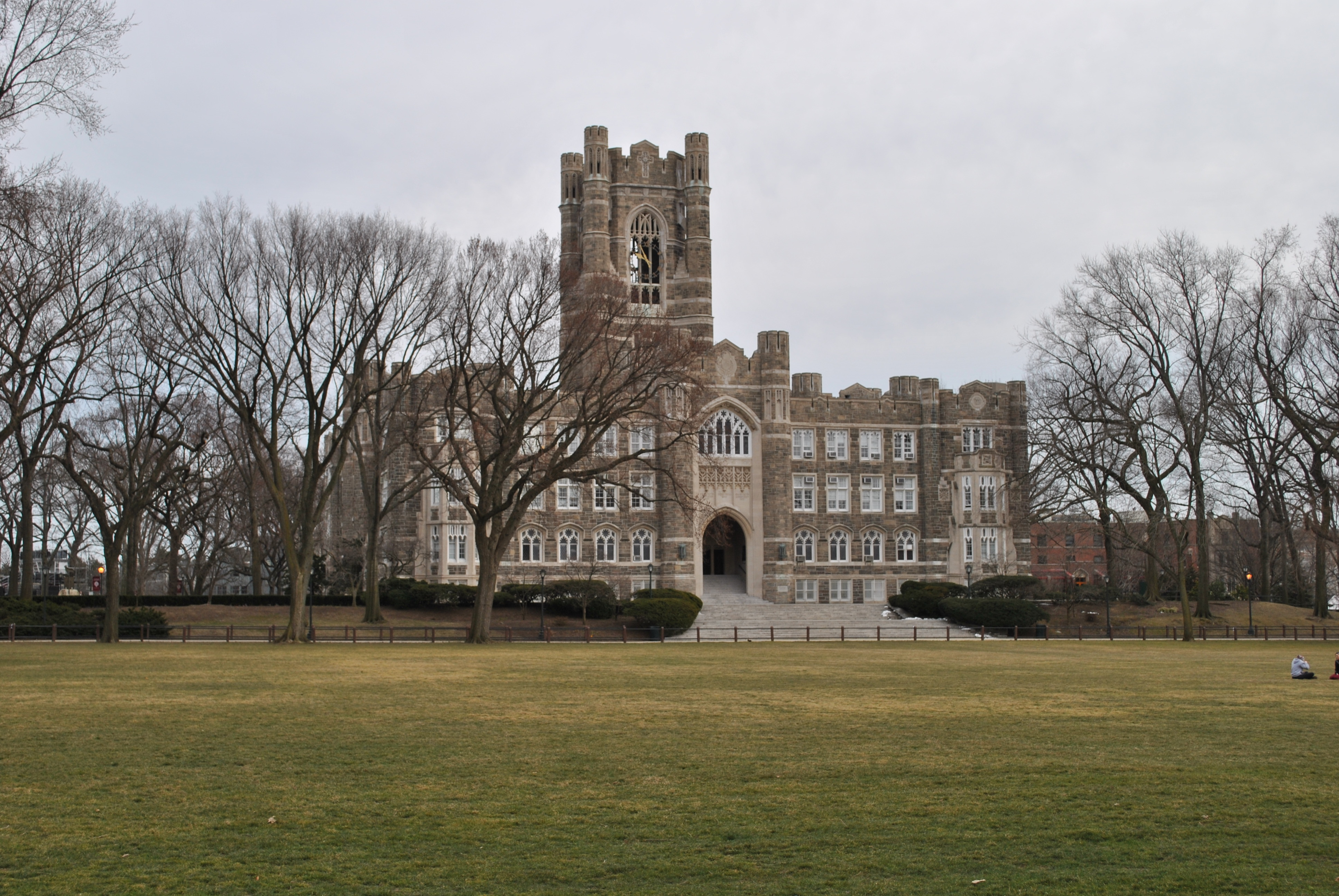
Keating Hall, administrative headquarters of the Graduate School of Arts & Sciences, Rose Hill

Master's and doctoral degrees are offered through the Graduate School of Arts and Sciences, the School of Law, the Graduate School of Education, the Graduate School of Social Service, the Gabelli School of Business, and the Graduate School of Religion and Religious Education. Fordham's graduate programs in business, education, English, history, law, psychology, and social work were all ranked among the top 100 in the nation by the 2016 U.S. News & World Report. Fordham participates in the Inter-University Doctoral Consortium, which allows its doctoral students to take classes at a number of schools in the New York metropolitan area.

Fordham's medical school officially closed in 1919, and its College of Pharmacy followed suit in 1972. Nevertheless, the university continues its tradition of medical education through a collaboration with the Albert Einstein College of Medicine at Yeshiva University. The partnership allows Fordham undergraduate and graduate science students to take classes, conduct research, and pursue early admission to select programs of Einstein. In addition, it involves a physician mentoring program, which permits students to shadow an attending physician at Einstein's Montefiore Medical Center.

=== Research ===
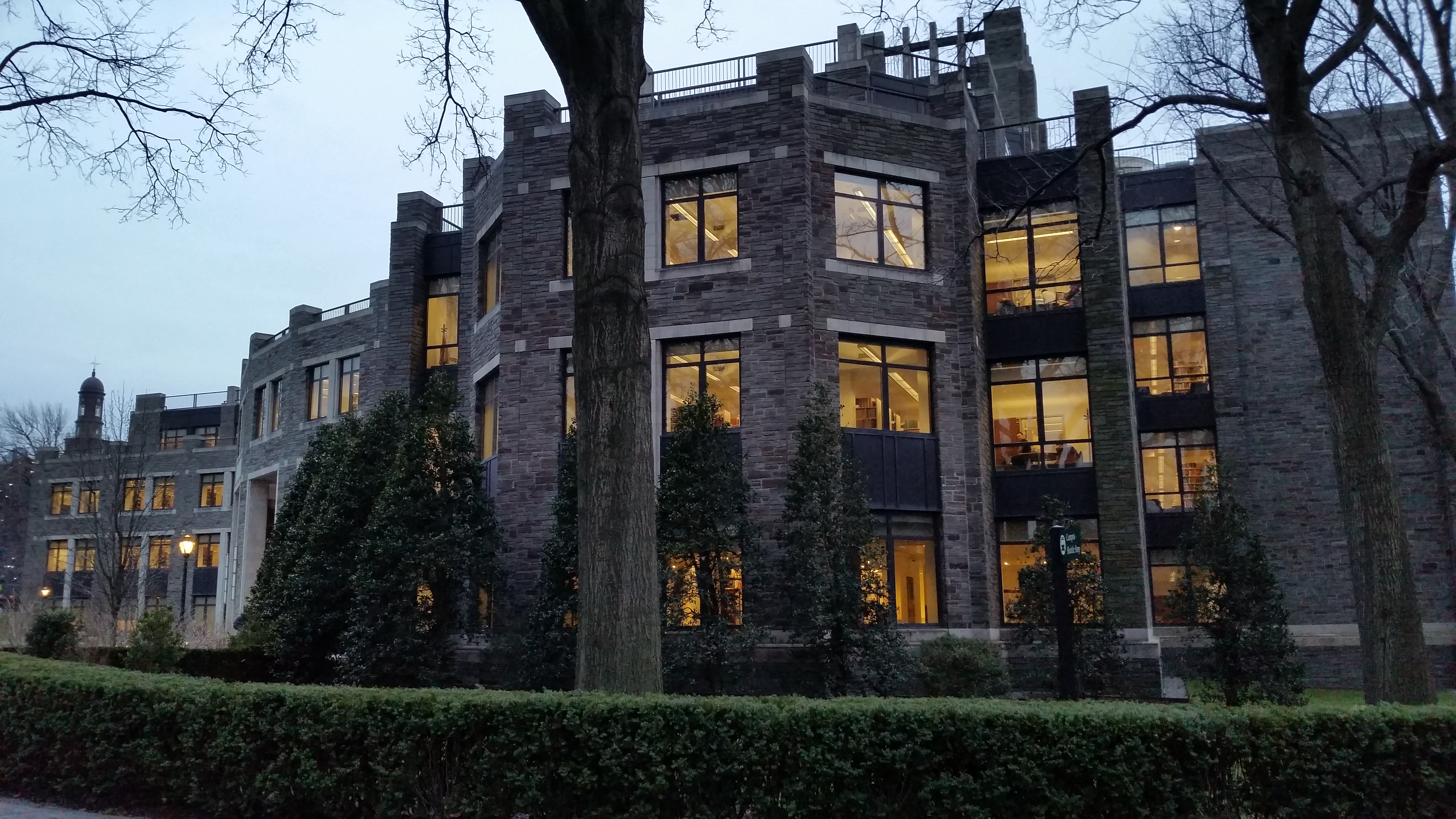
William D. Walsh Family Library, Rose Hill

The university is classified among "R2: Doctoral Universities – High research activity". The Fordham University Library System contains over 2.5 million volumes and 3.1 million microforms, subscribes to 16,000 periodicals including electronic access, and has 19,300 audiovisual materials. It is a depository for 363,227 United States Government documents. The university's Interlibrary Loan office provides students and faculty with virtually unlimited access to the over 20 million volumes of the New York Public Library System as well as to media from the libraries of Columbia University, New York University, the City University of New York, and other libraries around the world. Fordham's libraries include the William D. Walsh Family Library, ranked in 2004 as the fifth best collegiate library in the country, and the Science Library at the Rose Hill campus; the Gerald M. Quinn Library and the Leo T. Kissam Memorial Law Library at the Lincoln Center campus; and the Media Center at the Westchester campus. In addition to the university's formal libraries, several academic departments, research institutes, and student organizations maintain their own literary collections. The Rose Hill campus's Duane Library, despite its name, is no longer a library but offers reading and study space for students.

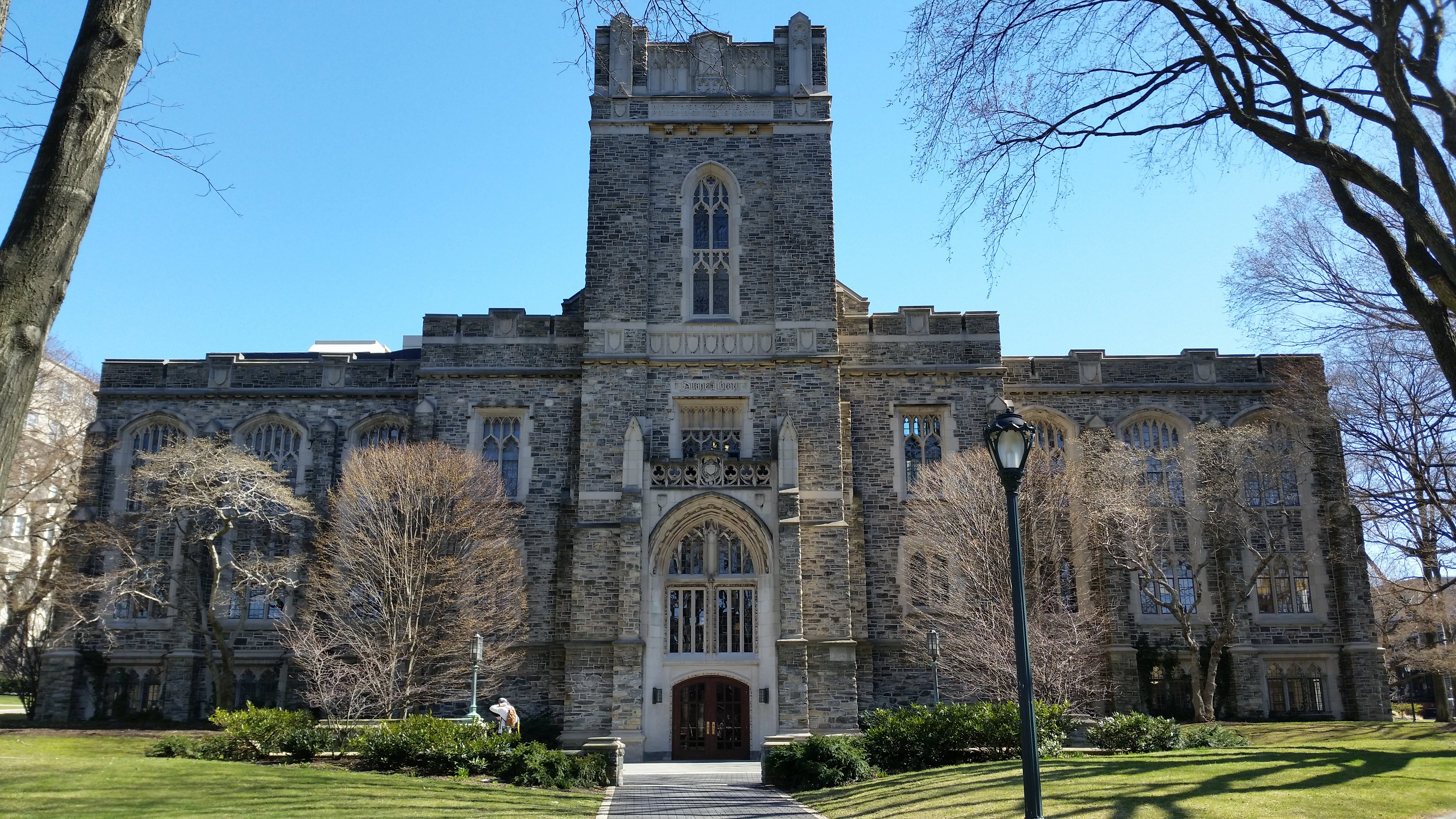
Duane Library, Rose Hill

Fordham maintains several special collections housed in museums and galleries on campus. The Fordham Museum of Greek, Etruscan, and Roman Art is at the Rose Hill campus and contains more than 200 artifacts from Classical antiquity, including: sculptures, mosaics, ceramics and pottery, coins, and inscriptions, among other items. A gift from alumnus William D. Walsh, it is the largest collection of its kind at any college or university in the New York metropolitan area. The university maintains an extensive art collection, which is housed in exhibition spaces at the Rose Hill and Lincoln Center campuses and in galleries around New York City. Finally, the university possesses a sizable collection of rare books, manuscripts, and other print media, which is housed in the O'Hare Special Collections Room at the Walsh Library.

Other research facilities include the Louis Calder Center, a 114-acre biological field station and the middle site along an 81-mile (130 km) urban-forest transect known as the Urban-Rural Gradient Experiment; the William Spain Seismic Observatory, a data collection unit for the US Geological Survey; and other facilities. It is a member of the Bronx Scientific Research Consortium, which also includes the New York Botanical Garden, the Bronx Zoo, the Albert Einstein College of Medicine at Yeshiva University, and Montefiore Medical Center. Furthermore, Fordham faculty have conducted research with such institutions as the Memorial Sloan-Kettering Cancer Center, Los Alamos National Laboratory, and organizations worldwide.

Fordham University Press, the university's publishing house and an affiliate of Oxford University Press, primarily publishes humanities and social sciences research. The university also hosts an Undergraduate Research Symposium every year during the spring semester and publishes the Undergraduate Research Journal in conjunction with the symposium. It facilitates research opportunities for undergraduates with such organizations as the National Science Foundation, The Cloisters, and the American Museum of Natural History.

=== Honor societies and programs ===
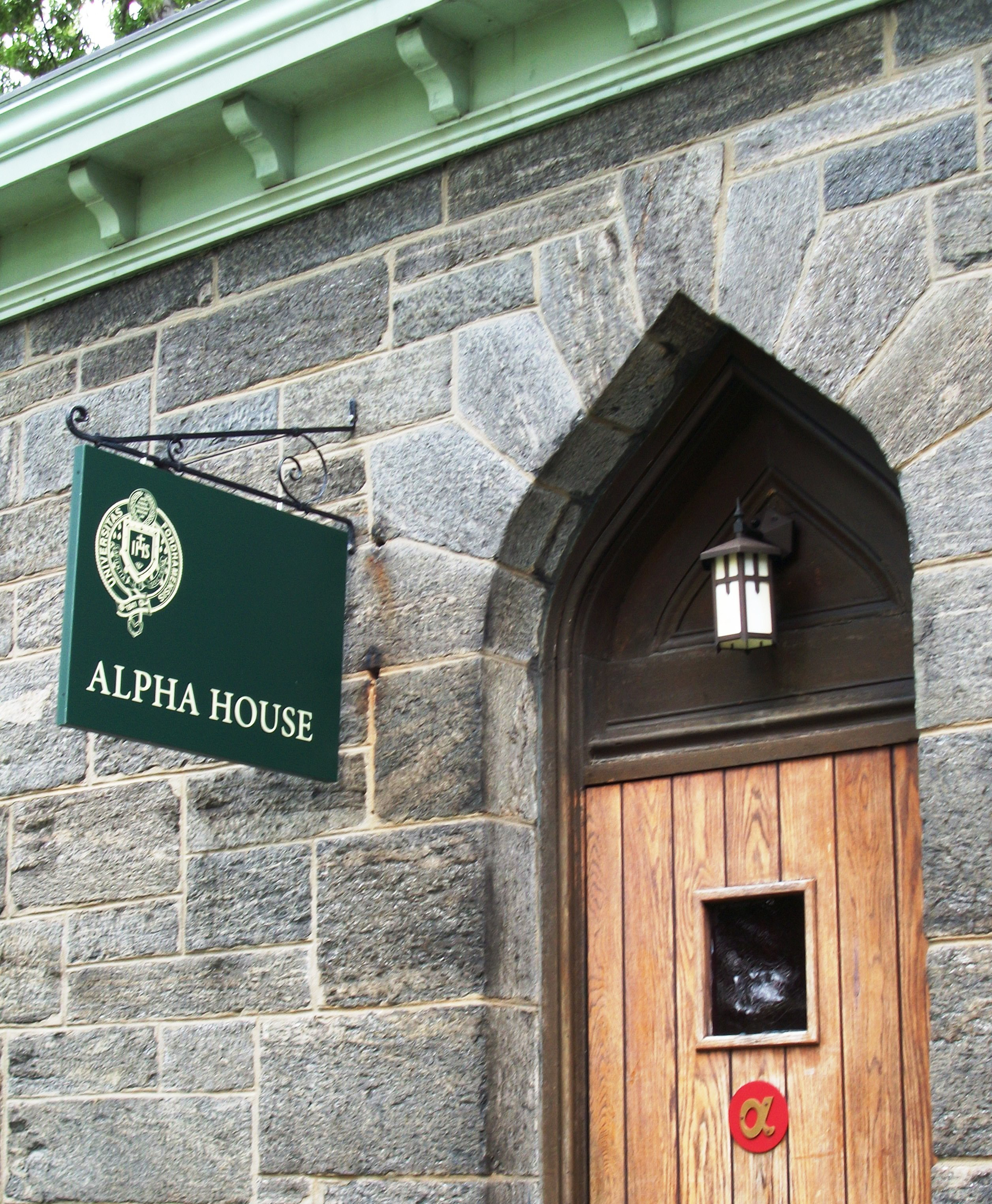
Alpha House, Rose Hill

Fordham's undergraduate schools all offer honors programs for their students. The programs' curricula are modified versions of the Core Curriculum. For example, the Fordham College Honors Program, a community of scholars for justice, offers a Great Books curriculum with seminar-style classes and a senior research thesis in each student's major. Most honors students are inducted into the programs upon admission to the university, though some are invited at the end of their first year. Each program has a designated study space for its members, including Alpha House for the Fordham College Honors Program and the honors wing of Hughes Hall for the Global Business Honors Program. Upon graduating from the university, honors students receive the designation of in cursu honorum on their diploma and transcripts.

=== Military education ===
Insignia of the Fordham ROTC unit

The Fordham Military Science program is available to all undergraduate and graduate students, regardless of their chosen course of study. It is also available to students at more than fifty other colleges and universities in the New York metropolitan area. The program consists of membership and training in the Yankee Battalion (previously referred to as the Ram Battalion) of the Army Reserve Officer Training Corps (ROTC) and a sequence of military science classes taught on campus. Participants in the program are also eligible to enroll in the Air Force ROTC program at Manhattan University and the Navy ROTC program at SUNY Maritime College. In 2011, Fordham Military Science began offering a combat nursing program in conjunction with Regis University and the University of Colorado at Denver.

The Military Science program has several notable alumni, including former Secretary of State Colin Powell, four-star General John M. Keane, and at least four recipients of the Medal of Honor. Furthermore, it has been distinguished as being in the top fifteen percent of military science programs in the country.

In addition to its ROTC program, the university contributes to military education through its Veterans Initiative, which provides full-tuition scholarships and other benefits to post-9/11 veterans of the U.S. military. Because of the initiative, Fordham was named one of the 25 best colleges in the country for veterans in 2013 by Military History Monthly Magazine.

=== Rankings and reputation ===
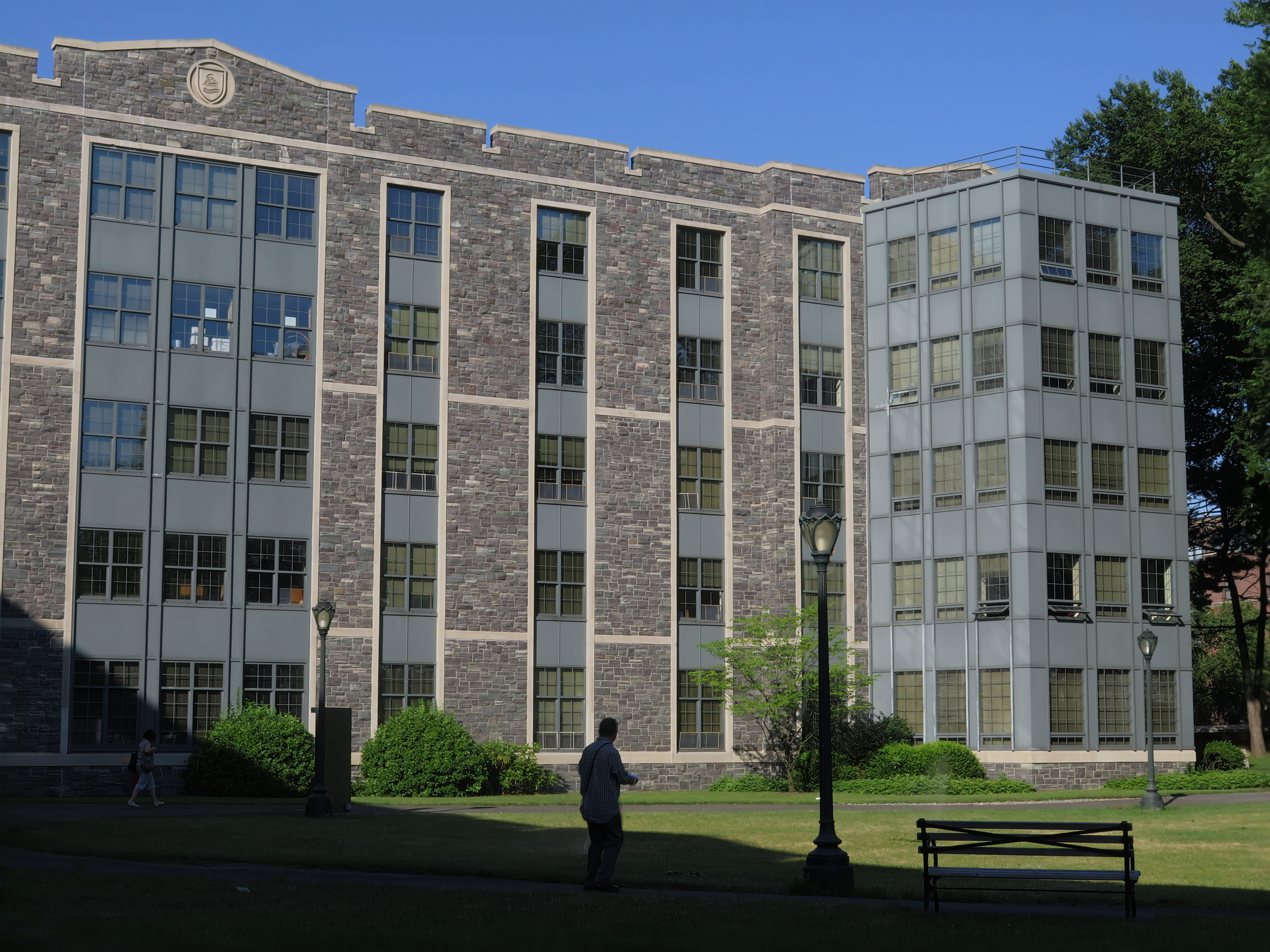
O'Hare Hall at Rose Hill campus

Academic rankings

National
- Forbes: 118
- U.S. News & World Report: 91 (tie)
- Washington Monthly: 215
- WSJ/College Pulse: 185

Global
- ARWU: 801–900
- QS: 1001–1200
- THE: 601–800
- U.S. News & World Report: 1164 (tie)

U.S. News & World Report Graduate Program Rankings
| Biological Sciences | 190 |
| Business | 80 |
| Clinical Psychology | 74 |
| Education | 39 |
| English | 51 |
| History | 79 |
| Law | 27 |
| Psychology | 131 |
| Social Work | 25 |
| Sociology | 102 |

Fordham University is ranked by several national organizations. In 2025, the university was ranked tied for No. 91st by U.S. News & World Report in "Best National Universities," tied at No. 57 in "Best Colleges for Veterans", tied at 40th for "Best Undergraduate Teaching", 73rd in "Top Value Schools", and tied for 153rd in "Top Performers on Social Mobility". In 2019, Forbes ranked the university 141st among "Top Colleges", while Kiplinger ranked it 62nd of 100 Best Values in Private Universities in 2018.

For 2021, UniRanking listed Fordham fifth among the top Catholic Universities in the world and fourth among US schools.

Fordham has also been named one of the country's Hidden Ivies, (Note: Fordham was included in the third edition of the Hidden Ivies published in 2016.) which are classed as "renowned academic institutions" that "rival the Ivy League."

The AACSB accredited Gabelli School of Business was ranked tied for tenth in "Undergraduate International Business Rankings" by U.S. News & World Report for 2021, and in 2016, Bloomberg Businessweek ranked it the 27th best undergraduate business school in the nation. For 2021, USN&WR ranked Gabelli undergrad business 63rd. For 2022, Poets and Quants ranked Gabelli #1 for Corporate, Social and Environmental Responsibility and #10 for Best EMBA programs. Also for 2022, The Economist posted their list of the top 100 MBA programs in the world where only 50 were US programs. Gabelli was listed 94th.

Gabelli Business School's MBA program tied for 80th among "America's Best Business Schools" by U.S. News & World Report. The Fordham Law School in 2020 was ranked 27th in U.S. News & World Report's ranking of "America's Best Law schools".

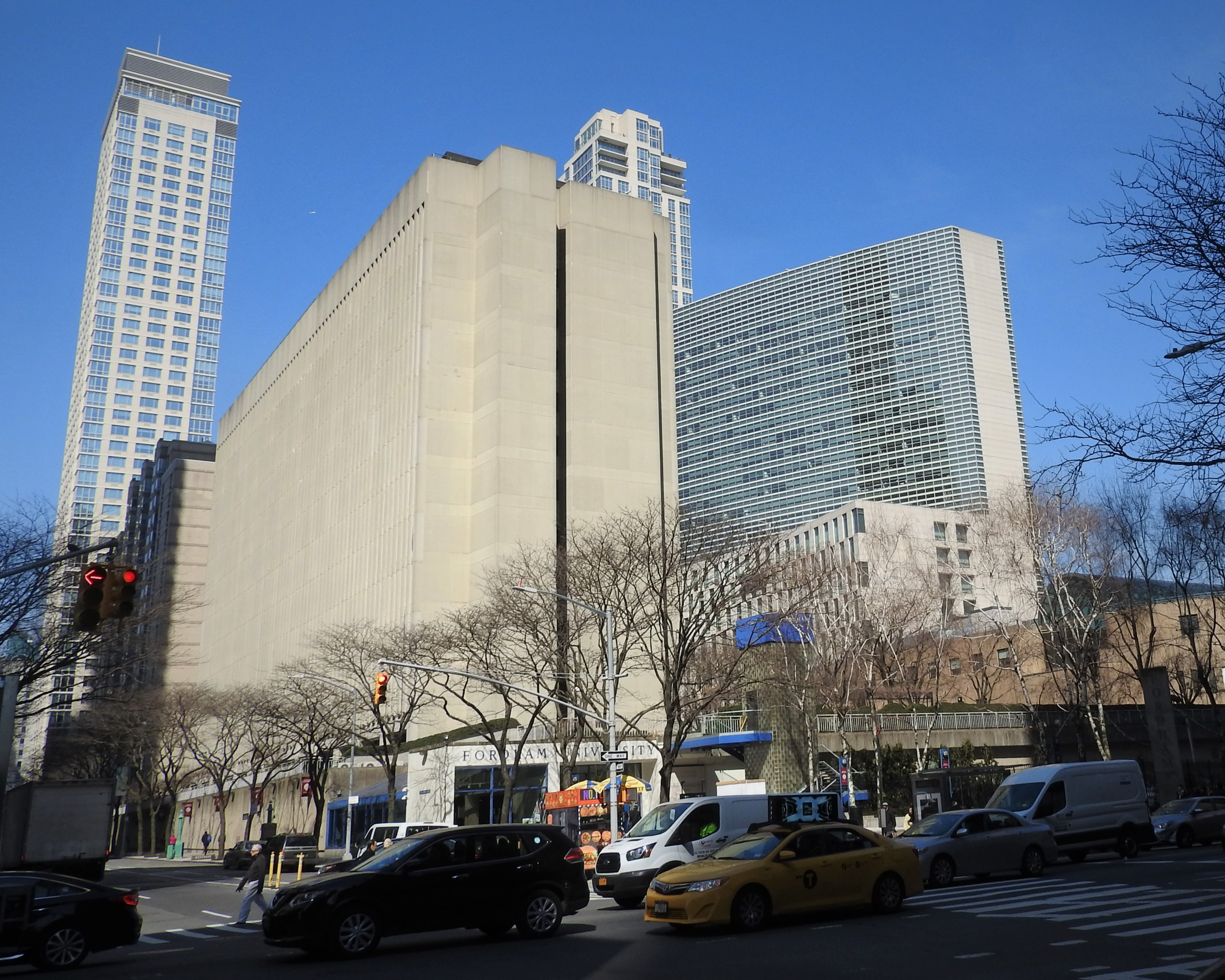
View of the Lincoln Center Campus

== Athletics ==
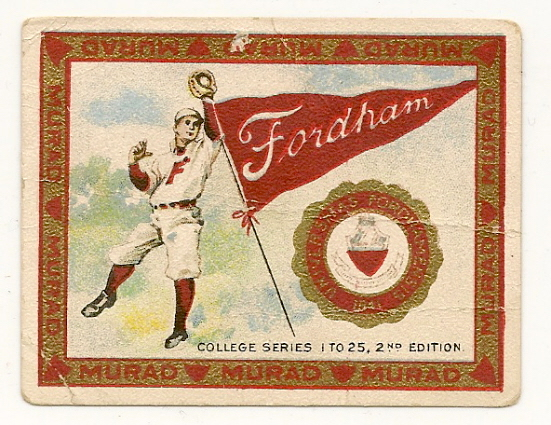
College series Fordham baseball card, c. 1910

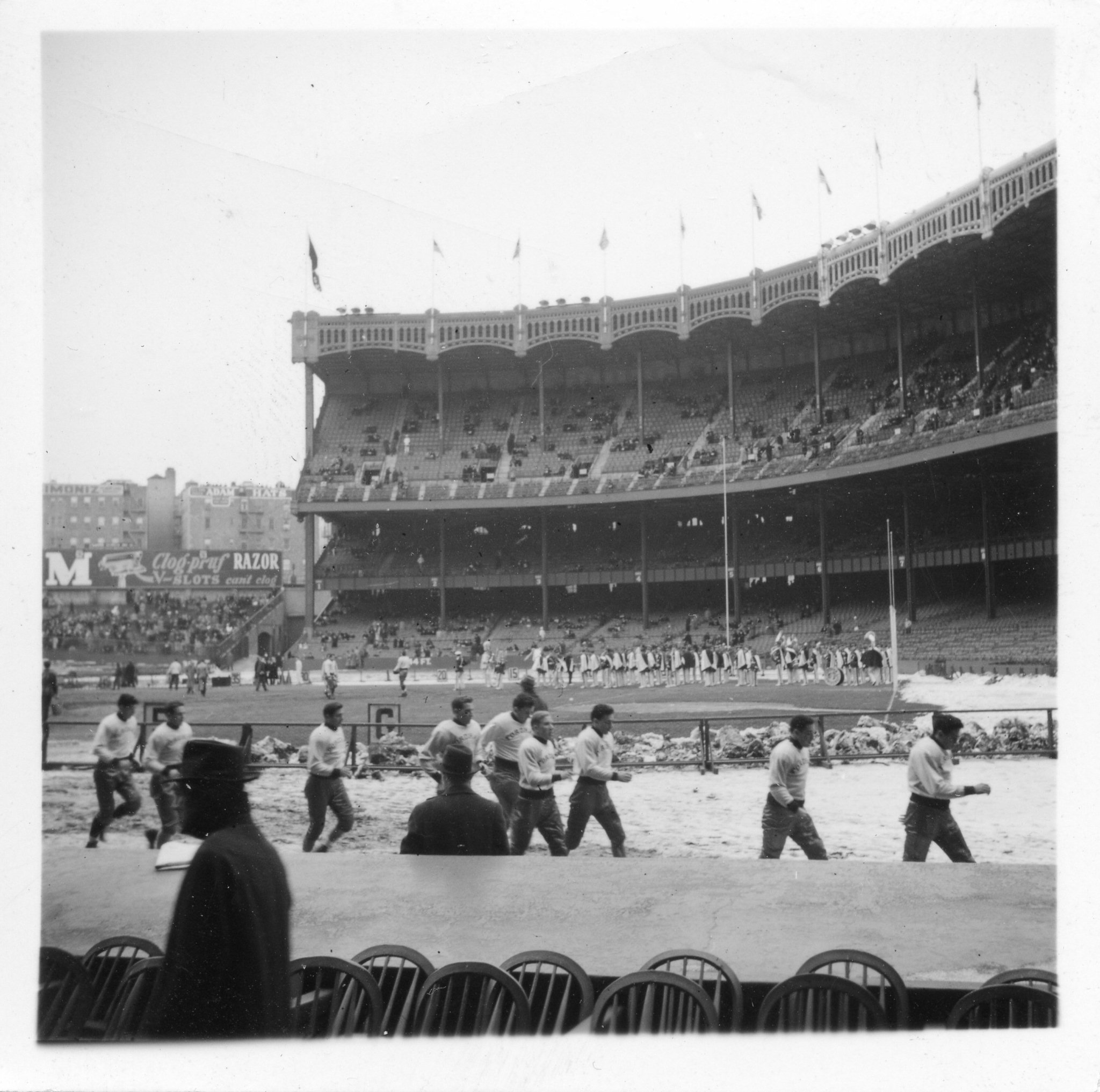
The Rams football team in Yankee Stadium on November 30, 1940, during a game against NYU

The university supports 21 men's and women's varsity athletic teams, as well as various club and intramural sports. The Fordham colors are maroon and white and its mascot is the ram. In most varsity sports, the Rams compete in Division I of the National Collegiate Athletic Association and are a member of the Atlantic 10 Conference. The football team, however, plays in NCAA Division I FCS and is an associate member of the Patriot League, reported to be the most academically selective NCAA conference after the Ivy League.

The Ram's football team ended the 1929 season as title holders according to college football's fictitious national championship, boasts two bowl game appearances (1941 and 1942), two Patriot League championships (2002 and 2007) and corresponding NCAA Division I Football Championship appearances. It is best known, however, for the "Seven Blocks of Granite," a name given to the team's 1928 and 1936 offensive lines. The 1936 team was coached by "Sleepy" Jim Crowley, one of the University of Notre Dame's famed "Four Horsemen," and included Vince Lombardi, the legendary Green Bay Packers coach. The team provoked the term "Ivy League" after New York Herald Tribune sportswriter Caswell Adams called then powerhouses Princeton and Yale "only Ivy League" compared to this Fordham team. Moreover, the Los Angeles Rams NFL franchise was named in honor of Fordham's football heritage.

The Fordham men's basketball program has made four NCAA Tournament appearances and 16 National Invitational Tournament appearances. During the 1971 season, the program enjoyed its best campaign ever, compiling a 26–3 record and earning a No. 9 national ranking. That team was coached by Digger Phelps, who accepted an offer to coach Notre Dame after the 1971 season ended. Peter "PJ" Carlesimo was a reserve on Fordham's 1971 team; he later became the head coach of the Brooklyn Nets NBA franchise and was involved in a famous choking incident with Latrell Sprewell. Fordham basketball plays in the Rose Hill Gymnasium (also known as "The Prairie"), the oldest on-campus venue in use by an NCAA Division I basketball team.

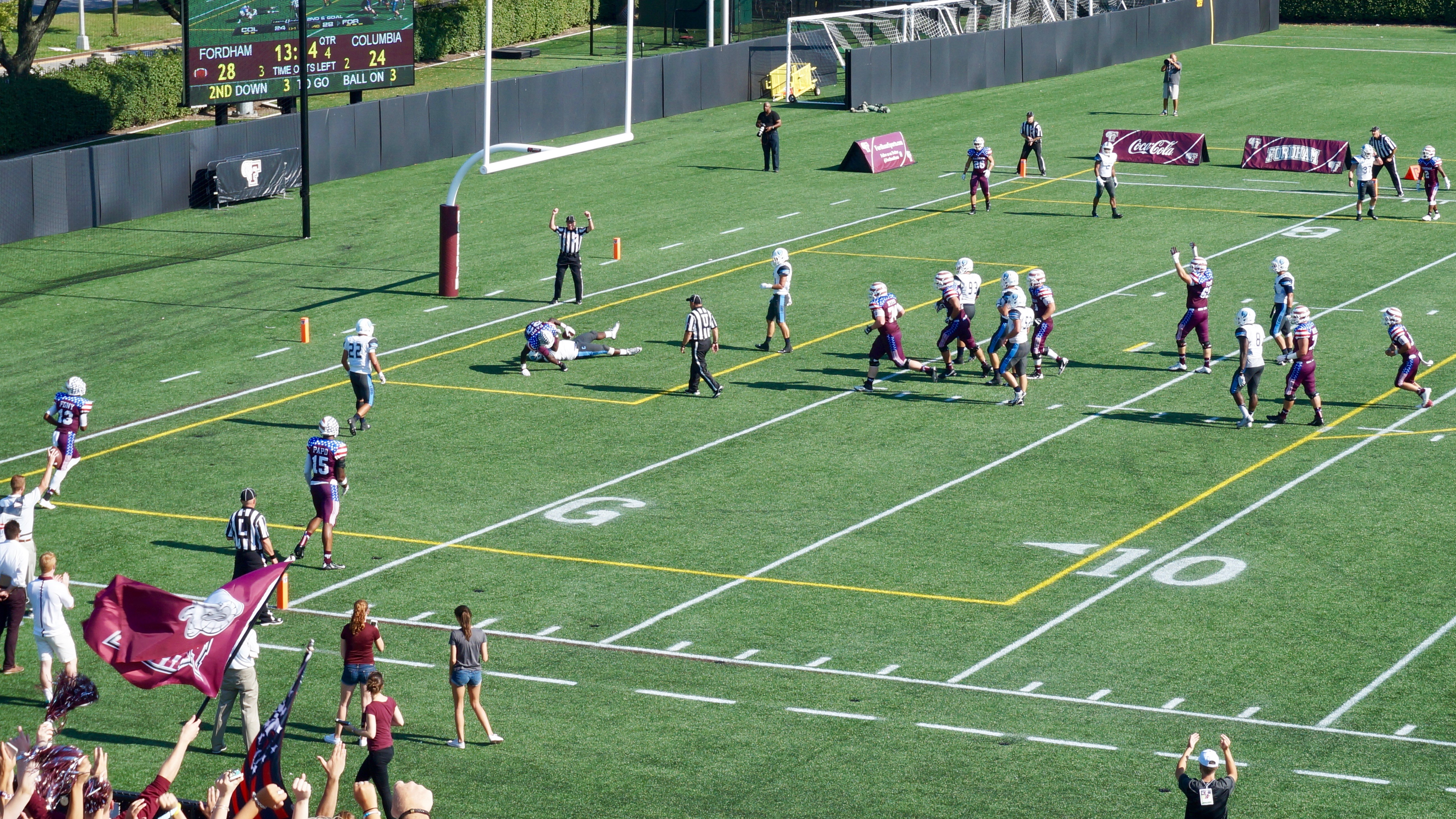
Fordham football in The Liberty Cup against Columbia at Jack Coffey Field, 2015

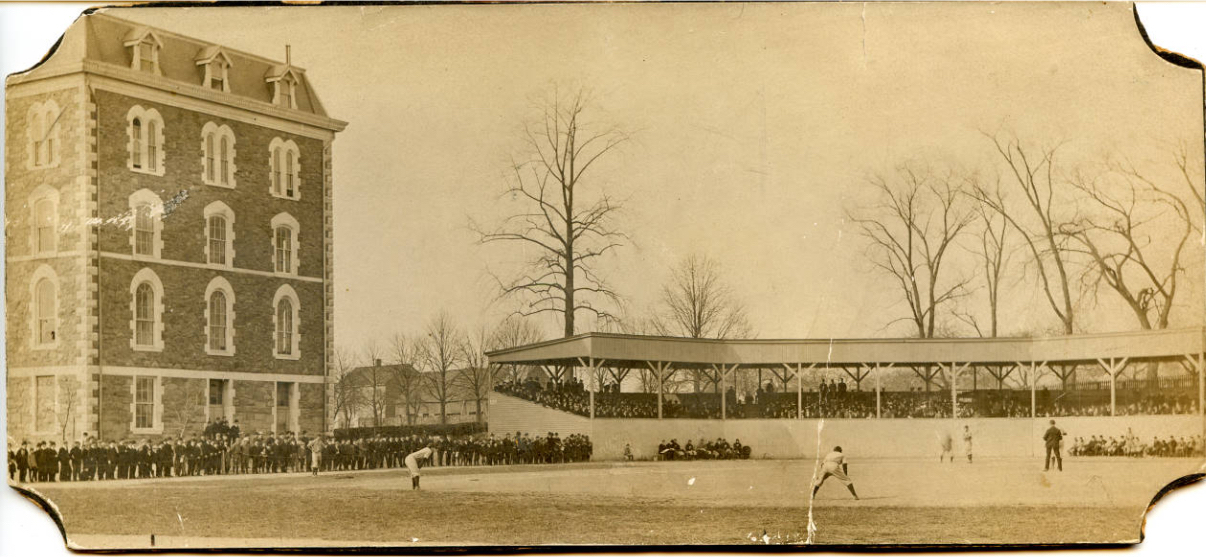
A game against Yale on the Fordham baseball field, April 1902

The Rams baseball program is among the oldest in the nation and was the first college baseball team to play the game according to modern rules. The program has launched the careers of 57 Major League Baseball players, including National Baseball Hall of Fame inductee Frankie Frisch (also known as the "Fordham Flash"). In April 2010, a Fordham baserunner made national headlines when he somersaulted over an opposing team's catcher to score a run during a game. The incident was dubbed the "Fordham Flip." The Rams baseball team holds the record for most NCAA Division I baseball victories in history.

There are eight women's teams on campus. The women's basketball team won the Atlantic 10 championship in 2014, advancing to the first round of the NCAA Women's Division I Basketball Championship. This feat came just 6 years after the team set an NCAA record for the worst season, finishing the season 0–29 in 2008.

The university's programs include track and field, which claims world record holder and Olympic gold medalist Tom Courtney as an alumnus; sailing, which is headquartered at the Morris Yacht and Beach Club in City Island, Bronx; crew, which rows out of the Peter Jay Sharp Boathouse on the Harlem River and frequents the Henley Royal Regatta in the United Kingdom; and golf, which is affiliated with the Winged Foot Golf Club in Mamaroneck, New York.

== Student life ==
=== Groups and activities ===
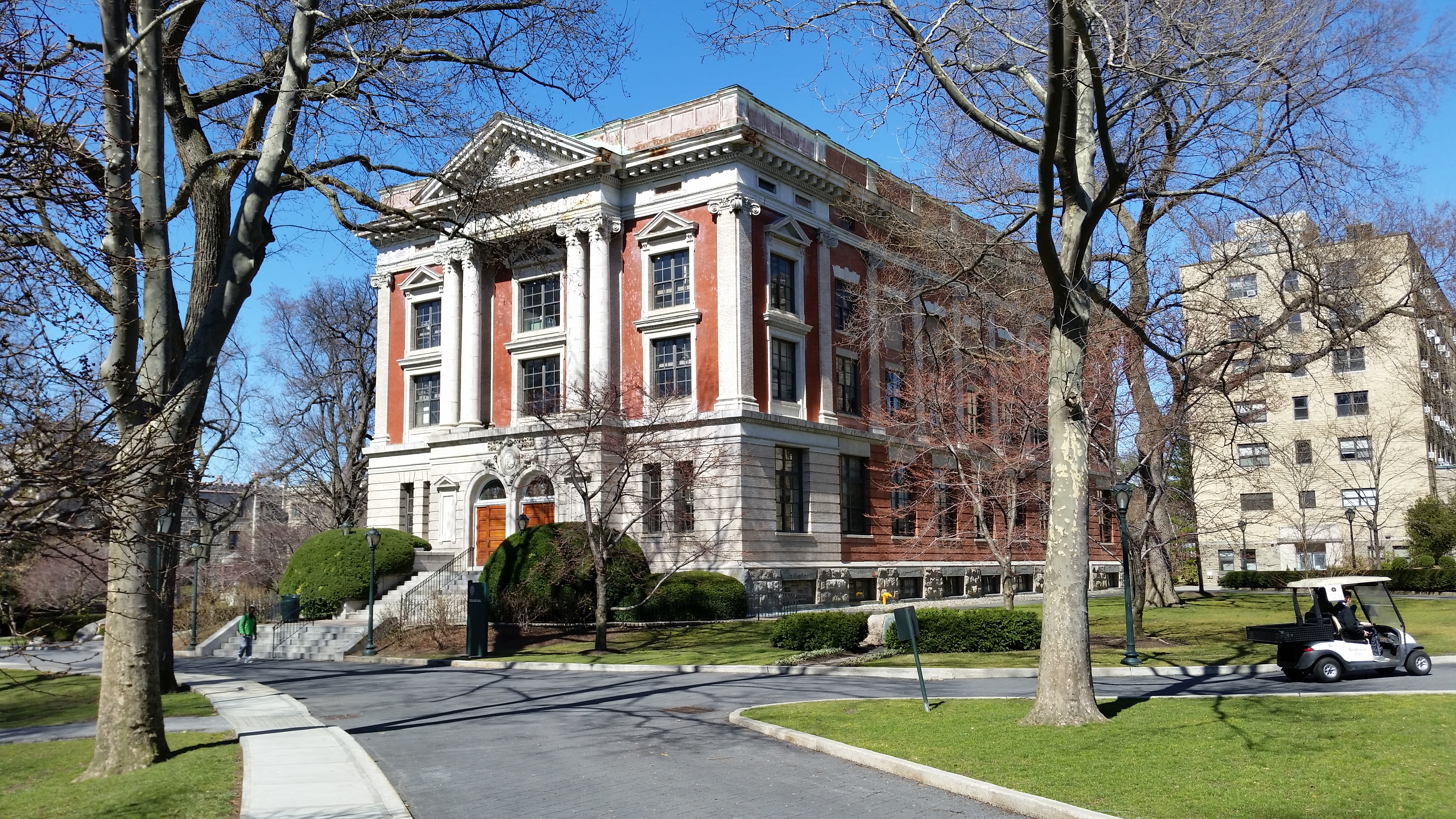
Collins Auditorium, theater at Rose Hill and home to the philosophy department

Clubs and organizations for undergraduate and graduate students number over 130 at the Rose Hill campus and 50 at Lincoln Center.

Fordham College at Rose Hill has a long history of college theater. The university maintains a number of theater groups at both Lincoln Center and Rose Hill (e.g. the Mimes and Mummers, Fordham Experimental Theater, the Theatrical Outreach Program, Splinter Group). There are also choirs (University Choir, Schola Cantorum, Gloria Dei Choir) and a cappella groups spanning both campuses (Fordham Ramblers, Satin Dolls, b-Sides, Hot Notes, F-sharps). The Mimes and Mummers, the oldest entirely student-run club at Fordham University and among the oldest college theater groups in the United States, was founded in 1855 as the Saint John's Dramatic Society. The Mimes put on two musicals, a drama, and a comedy each year – all non-student-written shows – as well as workshops designed to help students at Fordham learn about theater. The club receives from the school a budget which allows the hiring of professional directors, music directors, and choreographers but the shows are student produced, with all elements of technical design run by the club's executive board.

In 1905, with the construction of Collins Hall, Fordham University became the first place on the East Coast of the United States to have a theater in the round. The Penthouse Theatre, on the fourth floor of Collins Hall, served both for debuts of professional shows and home for theater groups like the Mimes and Mummers. The Penthouse Theatre was turned into office space in 1966.

In 1990, Alumni House, believed to be constructed in 1842 by William Rodrigue as a personal residence, an architect involved in the building of much of the early campus, was turned into a student-run space. Despite this account being questioned by the NYC Landmarks Preservation Commission in the report of its listing, it came to be known as Rodrigue's Coffee House. Rodrigue's, more commonly referred to as "Rod's" is an entirely student run coffee house and event space. Notable artists such as Frankie Cosmos, Matt and Kim, Japanese Breakfast, and Dreamcrusher have performed at Rod's.

In 2016, Fordham administrators denied recognition to a Lincoln Center chapter of Students for Justice in Palestine (SJP). The student government had approved the club, but Dean of Students Keith Eldredge overruled it, and the university cited the conduct of other SJP chapters. Four students sued in 2017, and a state court ordered Fordham to recognize the club in 2019. The Appellate Division reversed that ruling in 2020, and the New York Court of Appeals denied leave to appeal in May 2021, ending the case. SJP continues to operate without official status. It held a Lincoln Center encampment on May 1, 2024, that led to 15 arrests, and it organizes alongside the Rose Hill-based Palestine Solidarity Network.

=== Media ===
The university has a number of student publications, including The Fordham Ram, the university's official journal of record; The Observer, the newspaper for the Lincoln Center campus; the Fordham Political Review, the university's "undergraduate publication dedicated to politics, economics, social sciences, international affairs, and culture"; The Rival, an online-only student-run publication; and the paper, a student-run free-speech alternative journal.

WFUV is Fordham's 50,000-watt radio station, broadcasting on 90.7 FM. Founded in 1947, the station serves approximately 350,000 listeners weekly in the New York City metropolitan area. It is a National Public Radio affiliate and has an adult alternative format on weekdays and a variety format on weekends. In 2017 The Princeton Review ranked WFUV the second best college radio station in the United States.

=== Campus ministry ===
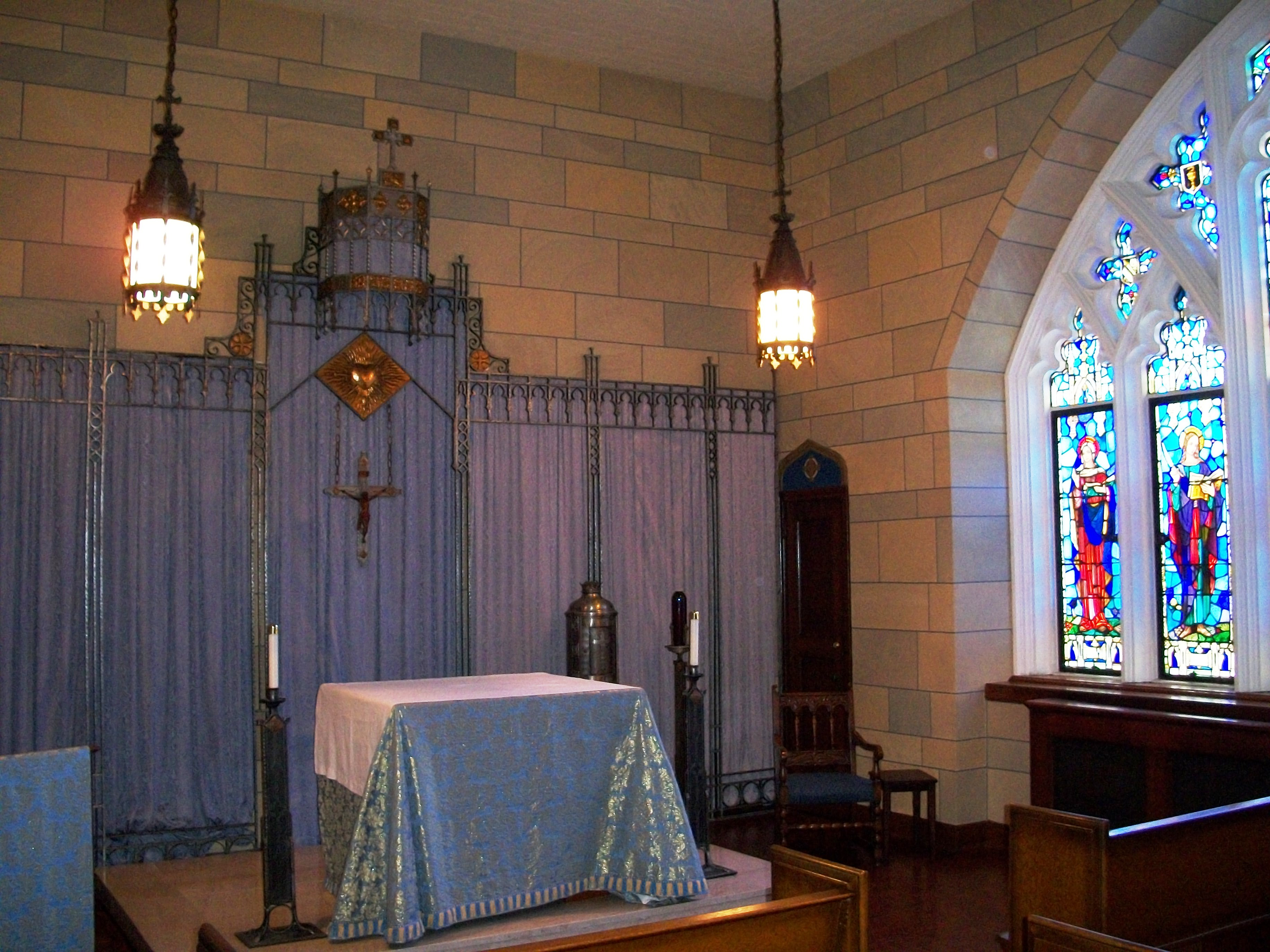
The Blue Chapel in Keating Hall, Rose Hill

The purpose of Campus Ministry at Fordham is to provide "opportunities and resources for spiritual growth to members of [the university] community." It offers programming for more than 15 faith traditions in such areas as worship, music ministry, and social ministry. One of its most popular initiatives is its retreats, which are held at the university's McGrath House of Prayer in Goshen, New York, and other retreat houses in the New York City metropolitan area. In addition to its Jesuit traditions, the university also has organizations devoted to Judaism, Islam, and other religions.

The university has a church and numerous chapels across its campuses. At Rose Hill are the University Church which houses Our Lady's Chapel in the basement; the Blue Chapel on the third floor of Keating Hall; the Sacred Heart Chapel in Dealy Hall; the St. Robert Bellarmine Chapel at Spellman Hall; along with chapels at several student residence halls. At the Lincoln Center campus is the Bl. Rupert Meyer Chapel in the Leon Lowenstein Building.

In conjunction with the Office of Mission and Ministry, Global Outreach (GO!) operates as a cultural immersion and service program where students learn about various issues of social, economic, political, and environmental injustice while living a simple lifestyle that fosters communal and spiritual growth. Teams consist of approximately 10 students, one student leader, and one chaperone to live, work, and learn with partnering organizations. Building on the Jesuit tenets of Men and Women for Others, Magis, and Contemplatives in Action, GO! has grown over the years to include more than 30 projects throughout the United States and countries in Asia, Africa, Europe, and Latin America. GO!'s roots stretch back to the 1950s, when Fordham students were participating in various service and immersion projects. In the 1970s and '80s it became known as the Mexico project, with students coining the term Global Outreach in 1988.

The Dorothy Day Center for Service and Justice is responsible for overseeing Fordham's various community service and humanitarian initiatives. Grounded in the Jesuit principle of training "men and women for others", the center organizes projects in such areas as poverty, hunger, education, and disaster relief. As a result of the Dorothy Day Center's efforts, the university performed approximately one million hours of service in 2011, ranking it sixth among universities country-wide in terms of community outreach. A popular volunteer location among students is the Jesuit Health Care Center at the Rose Hill campus where students interested in nursing gain practical experience. The Dorothy Day Center also offers a pre-orientation "Urban Plunge" program, introducing incoming freshmen to social justice issues in New York City.

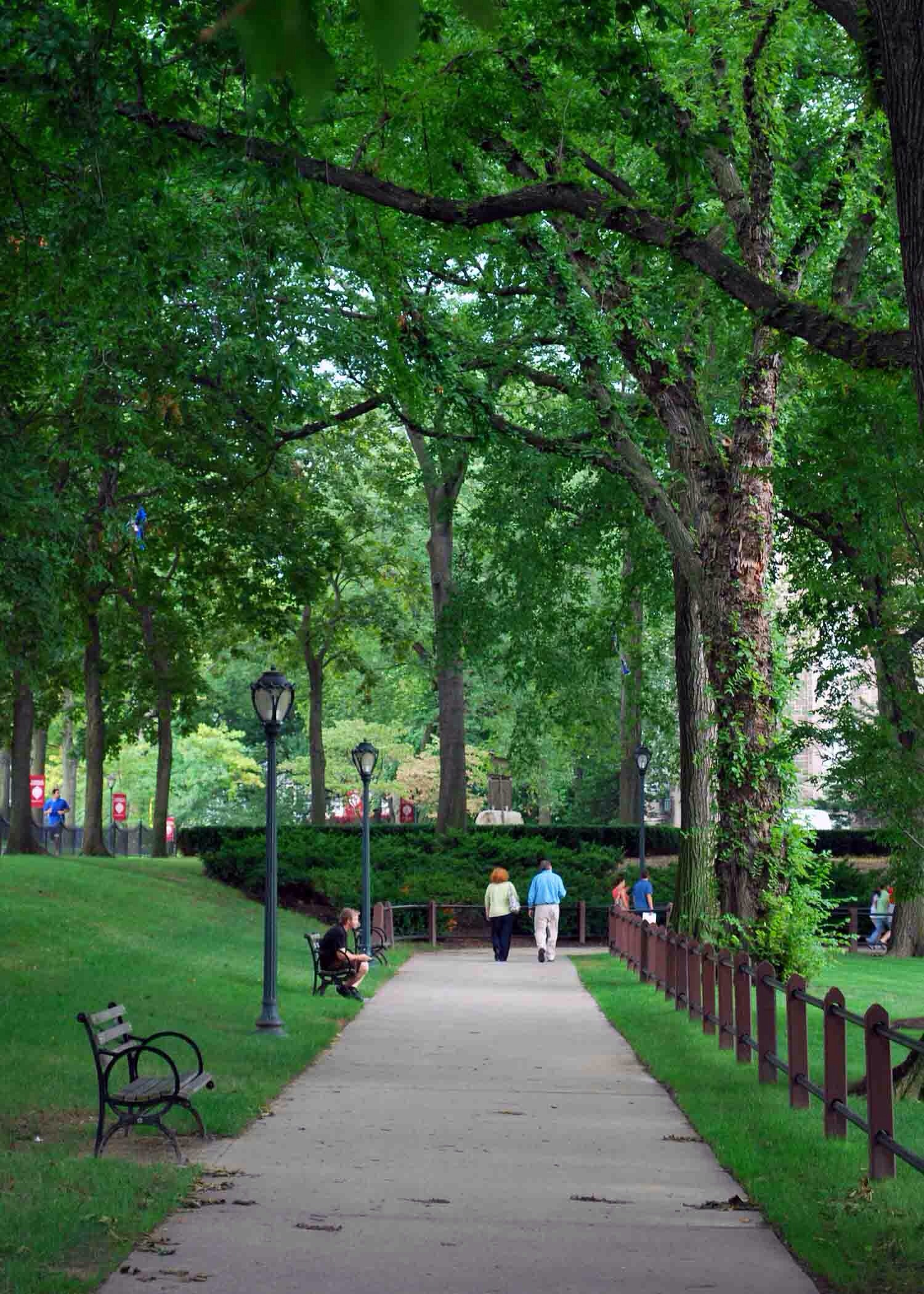
Fordham's Rose Hill campus is home to one of the largest collections of mature American elms in the United States.

=== Sustainability ===
In order to increase its sustainability, the university has committed to reducing its greenhouse gas emissions by 30% in 2017. In addition, it has pledged to employ low-flow faucets and shower heads, use sustainable materials like reprocessed flooring, recycle up to 90% of its debris, and seek LEED Silver certification in its construction of new facilities on campus. Also, the Department of Grounds Maintenance at Fordham has committed to making half of its vehicle fleet electric by 2016. The university has also proposed numerous environmental initiatives, including using certified green cleaning products, a uniform recycling program, and composting in cooperation with the New York Botanical Garden.

Fordham's Rose Hill campus is home to one of the largest collections of mature American elms in the country, the oldest estimated to be 270 years old.

== Traditions and symbols ==
=== Traditions ===
Since its founding in 1841, the university has developed many traditions. Some of them are described below:

- The President's Ball takes place every autumn on the eve of the Homecoming football game. It is a business formal event held in the Vince Lombardi Field House. It is hosted by the Office of the President, from which the name is derived.

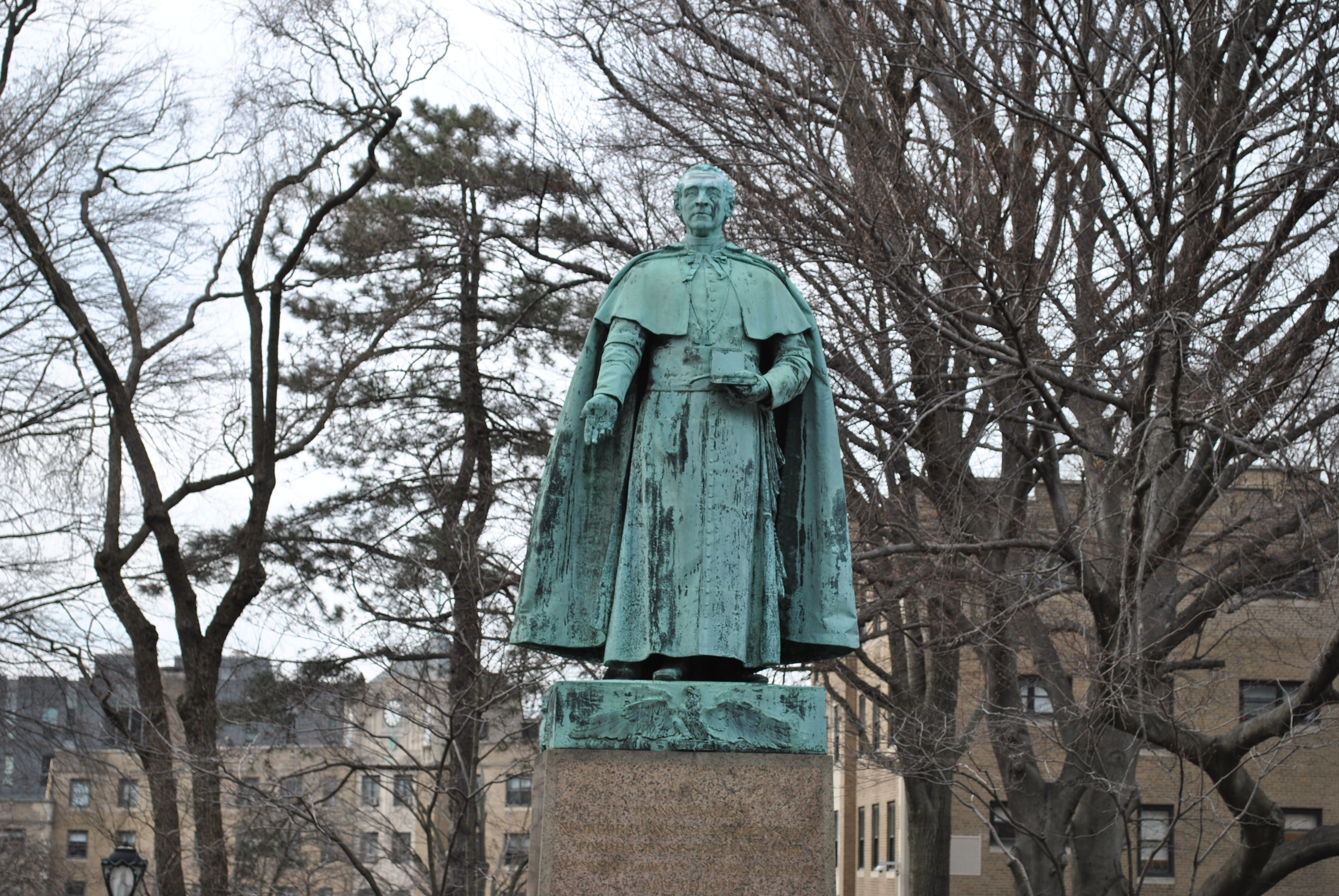
Statue of Archbishop Hughes gifted in 1891, Rose Hill campus

- The Winter Ball is a business casual event staged each winter by the United Student Government and the Activities Board of Lincoln Center, at venues in New York City including the Rainbow Room, the Russian Tea Room, and the Mandarin Oriental Hotel.
- The "Under the Tent" Dance is a smart casual event held the weekend before final exams. Sponsored by the university's Residence Halls Association, it takes place underneath a tent on Martyrs' Lawn, Fordham's second-largest quadrangle, and has a different theme each year. The dance is part of the Spring Weekend Festival, which also includes two concerts, a barbecue, a race around the Rose Hill campus, and a comedy show. The dance was previously held at the Lincoln Center campus as well, but was replaced in 2015 by an end-of-the-year event called "The Bash".
- The Festival of Lessons and Carols: The Fordham University Concert Choir presents a series of Nine Lessons and Carols every year during the Christmas season. An afternoon concert is performed at the University Church on the Rose Hill campus, and an evening concert is performed at the St. Paul the Apostle Church adjacent to the Lincoln Center campus.
- Each semester, the official beginning of the final exam period is marked by a "midnight breakfast", at which Fordham administration and professors cook students their favorite breakfast items so as to prepare them for the long night of studying ahead of them. The name comes from "burning the midnight oil" with studies, not from the time of the breakfast.
- The Liberty Cup was awarded annually to the winner of the football game between Fordham and Columbia universities. The tradition began in 2002, a year after the Fordham-Columbia game was postponed due to September 11 attacks. As of 2016, the series was ended by Columbia.
- The Rams-Crusader Trophy in football was first awarded in 1951 to commemorate a great coach of both Fordham and Holy Cross: Frank "Iron Major" Cavanaugh.
- Fordham College at Rose Hill hosts an Encaenia each year in early May. Faculty, administrators, and students process in academic regalia, and candidates for degrees at the current year's Commencement receive various awards and honors. The ceremony includes a sentimental speech by the year's valedictorian, as well as a generally more humorous, yet equally endearing, speech by the honorary Lord or Lady of the Manor.

=== Symbols ===
In addition to its traditions, Fordham is associated with a number of symbols, some of which are discussed below:

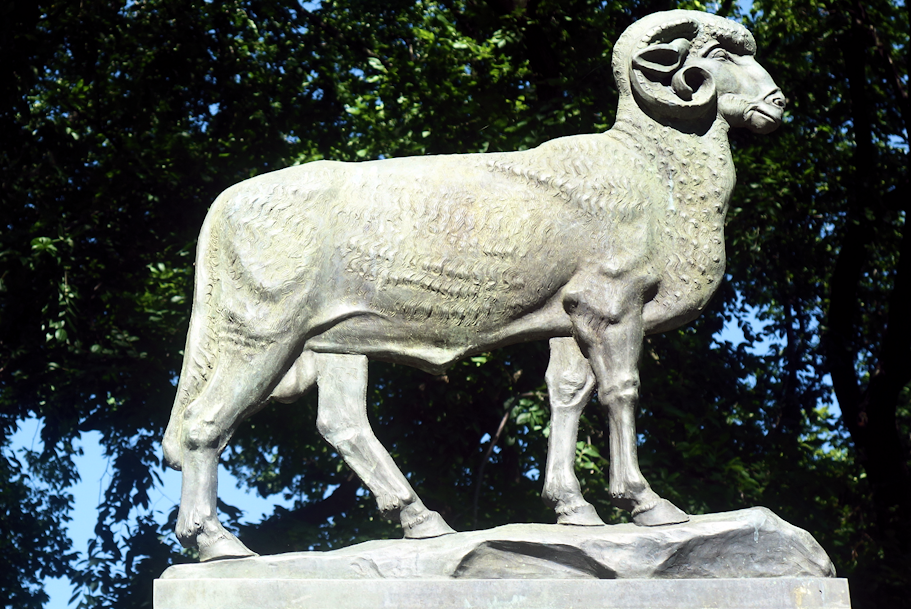
Statue of the Ram, the university mascot, Rose Hill

- The university's official color used to be magenta, one which was shared by Harvard University. Since it was confusing for the two schools to be wearing the same color during athletic competitions, the matter of which school could lay claim to magenta was to be settled through a series of baseball games. Fordham won the games, but Harvard reneged on its promise. Both schools continued to use the color until 1874, when the Fordham student government unanimously agreed to change to maroon. Maroon was chosen because it was not widely used at the time. Sometime later, Harvard stopped using magenta in favor of crimson.
- The ram became the university's mascot as a result of a slightly vulgar cheer Fordham fans sang during an 1893 football game against the United States Military Academy. The fans began cheering, "One-damn, two-damn, three-damn, Fordham!" which was an instant hit. Later, "damn" was sanitized to "ram" so the song would conform to the university's image.
- Presented to Fordham by Fleet Admiral Chester W. Nimitz ('44) of the US Navy, the Victory Bell was the ship's bell of the Japanese aircraft carrier Junyo. First rung on campus by President Harry S. Truman on May 11, 1946, it currently stands in front of the Rose Hill Gymnasium and peals following all Ram athletic victories and at the start of Commencement each year.

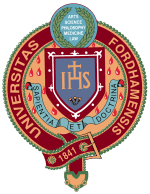
University seal

- The design of the Great Seal of Fordham University acknowledges the Society of Jesus presence on campus, hence elements of the order's coat of arms in the center on a light-purple shield, without the usual sunburst background. The borrowed elements include the IHS monogram used by the Jesuits as an abbreviation for the name of Jesus in Greek: IHSOUS, in this case with the Cross resting on the center of the H, and the three nails of the Crucifixion beneath the epigraph. These elements dressed in gold lay on the purple shield framed in maroon, the color of the university, with silver fleur-de-lis strung together atop the bordering frame at the edge of the shield. The fleur-de-lis symbolize the French origin of the Jesuits who arrived at Fordham in 1846. Immediately above the central shield rests the laurel crown in green on a light blue background, enclosing the university's original pedagogical disciplines in white capital letters listed above each other in the following order: ARTS,SCIENCE, PHILOSOPHY, MEDICINE, LAW. Below the shield is a light blue scroll with the university's motto in black capital letters, SAPENTIA ET DOCTRINA. Both the shield and the scroll rest on a gold field emblematic of learning (doctrina), upon which surrounds them with 14 fiery tongues of the Holy Spirit, evenly distributed, a symbol of wisdom (sapientia). Finally, surrounding the entire seal is an heraldic belt, which is employed as a stylistic decoration. It forms a circular maroon loop embroidered with green beads on its inner and outer edge, with a gold buckle and end tip. The belt is emblazoned with Fordham's official Latin title in gold capital letters: UNIVERSITAS FORDHAMENSIS; between the last two punch holes where the buckle is fastened and the end looped inside to wrap around, is in gold the date of the university's founding: 1841. The University of Oxford, the only other tertiary institution in the world that uses a belt in its seal, maintains that without its belt, their seal is not official.

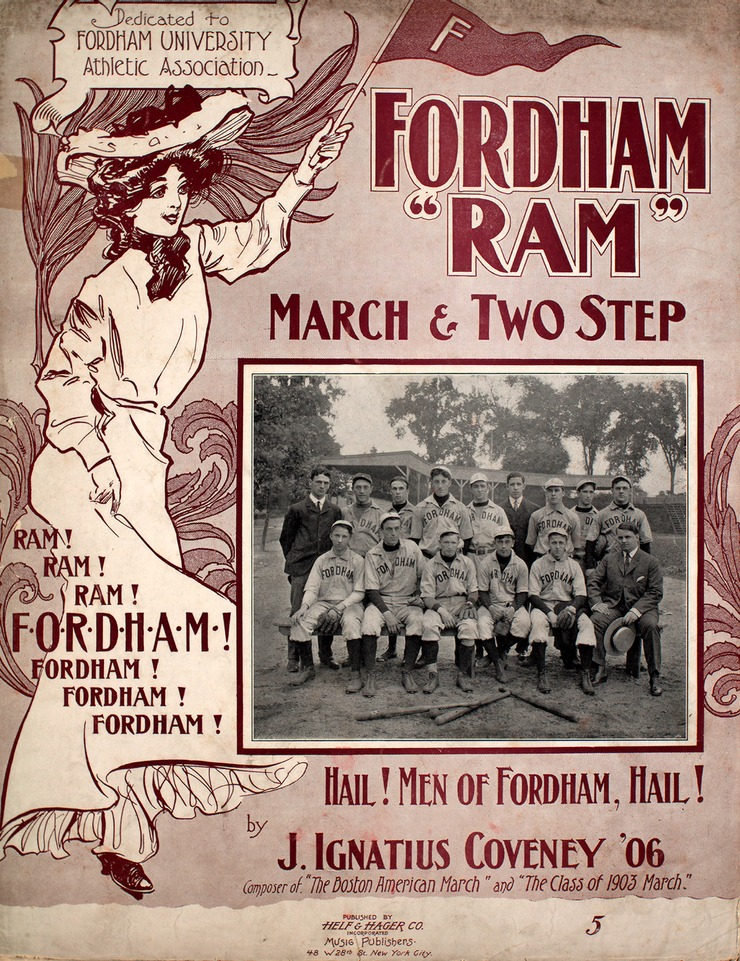
Fordham's fight song, "Fordham Ram" by J. Ignatius Coveney

- The mace of Fordham is traditionally carried at Commencement by the president of the Faculty Senate, who serves as the grand marshal of the main academic procession. The device, four feet in length, bears a regal crown at the summit to denote the sole power of the State of New York to grant academic degrees in its territory. Above the crown is a cross composed of four windmill sails, which signify the Catholic faith and the Dutch founders of New York City, respectively. The center of the cross displays a heraldic rose, which symbolizes Rose Hill. Immediately beneath the crown is a support, on which the university's seal is emblazoned. The upper node of the mace's staff is decorated with three heraldic roses, the Fordham seal, a ram's head, and a silhouette of the original Lincoln Center campus skyline. The titles of the university's constituent colleges are engraved above the node, and the names of the school's presidents from 1841 to 1966 are inscribed below it. The mace was a gift to the university from the Fordham University Alumni Federation.
- The terrace of the presidents: Robert Gannon, president of Fordham from 1936 to 1949, initiated the custom of engraving the granite steps leading up to Keating Hall with the names of heads of state who visit the university. Among the names engraved are George Washington, who visited the Rose Hill Manor before it was succeeded by St. John's College in 1841; Franklin Delano Roosevelt; Harry S. Truman; John F. Kennedy; Richard Nixon; and the names of various other heads of state from around the world.
- Fordham's official school song is "Alma Mater Fordham," and its fight song is "Fordham Ram" by J. Ignatius Coveney. In December 2013 the lyrics to "Fordham Ram" were changed from "Hail Men of Fordham, hail" to "Hail Rams of Fordham, hail" to be inclusive of the school's female majority. "The Marching Song" is typically played during parades and after athletic games, especially after a Ram victory.
- Since 2020, Fordham Debate Society has been represented by an alternative mascot, foregoing the use of the Ram in favor of Floyd the Debate Raccoon.

== Alumni and faculty ==
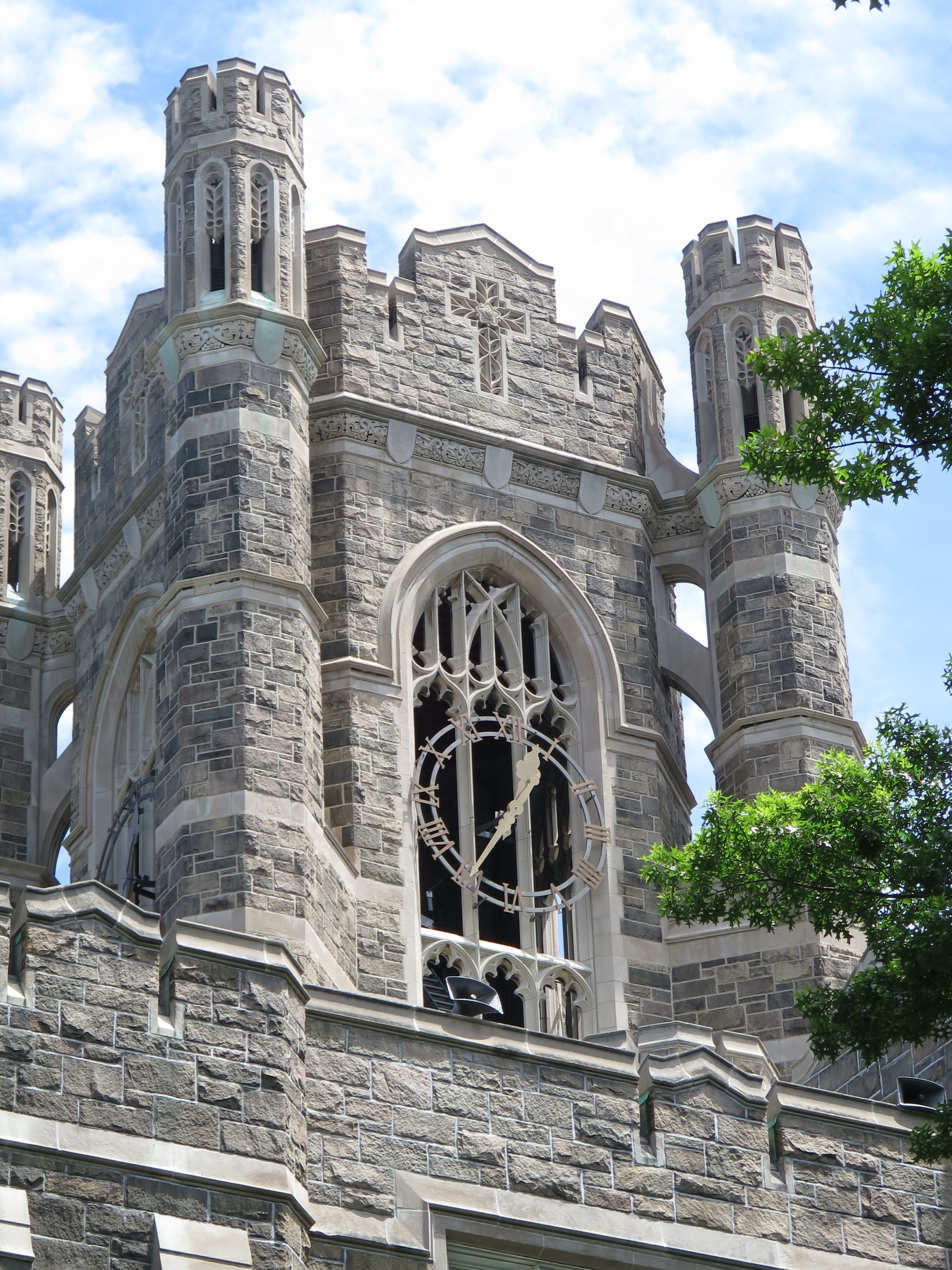
Keating Hall tower, Rose Hill

Fordham has over 183,500 alumni spread throughout the world, with 40 regional alumni chapters in the US and abroad.

Geraldine Ferraro, the first female vice presidential candidate of a major political party in the United States, attended Fordham, as did numerous United States congresspersons. Former New York State Governor Andrew Cuomo is an alumnus, as was Martin H. Glynn, the 40th governor of New York (1913–1914) and first Catholic to hold the office. Among those serving at high levels of the U.S. Executive Branch were Postmaster General John E. Potter; Central Intelligence Directors William J. Casey (1981 to 1987) and John O. Brennan (2013 to 2017); John N. Mitchell, Attorney General from 1969 to 1972; and Bernard M. Shanley, Deputy Chief of Staff and White House Counsel to President Dwight D. Eisenhower. President Donald Trump attended for two years and studied economics but left in 1966, transferring to the University of Pennsylvania.

Fordham claims a number of distinguished military honorees, including three Medal of Honor recipients and notable generals including General John "Jack" Keane, four-star general and Army vice chief of staff, and Major General Martin Thomas McMahon, decorated American Civil War officer. Fordham has produced college and university presidents for at least 10 institutions around the United States, including two for Georgetown University and one each for Columbia University and New York University, and produced Robert Kibbee, the Chancellor of the City University of New York. Cardinal Francis Spellman oversaw the Archdiocese of New York. James B. Donovan defended Rudolph Abel in his spy trial and negotiated the release of Francis Gary Powers. Archduchess Charlotte of Austria, daughter of the last Austrian Emperor, Charles I, studied at the School of Social Sciences.

Business and finance magnates who attended Fordham include Wendy Craigg, former Governor of the Central Bank of the Bahamas; Anne M. Mulcahy, chairperson and CEO of Xerox; Rose Marie Bravo, vice chairman and CEO of Burberry; E. Gerald Corrigan, President of the Federal Reserve Bank of New York; Maria Elena Lagomasino, CEO of JP Morgan Private Bank; Joe Moglia, businessman and former football coach; Stephen J. Hemsley, CEO of UnitedHealth Group; Wellington Mara, New York Giants owner; John D. Finnegan, chairman, president, and CEO of Chubb Corporation; Mario Gabelli, billionaire and founding CEO of GAMCO Investors; Lorenzo Mendoza, billionaire and CEO of Empresas Polar; Eugene Shvidler, billionaire and international oil tycoon; and Frank Calderoni, CEO of Anaplan.

In the media and communications field, Fordham has produced Charles Osgood, three-time Emmy Award and two-time Peabody Award-winning journalist for CBS and Radio Hall of Fame inductee; Louis Boccardi, President of the Associated Press; Pulitzer Prize-winning journalist Loretta Tofani; Jim Dwyer, Pulitzer Prize-winning columnist and author; G. Gordon Liddy, President Richard Nixon associate and leader of the White House Plumbers, political pundit, and radio show host; NPR's All Things Considered host Scott Detrow; and Baseball Hall of Fame broadcaster and Radio Hall of Famer Vin Scully.

Fordham's contributors to arts and entertainment include Denzel Washington, two-time Academy Award and two-time Golden Globe Award-winning actor; Alan Alda, six-time Emmy Award and six-time Golden Globe Award-winning actor; Academy Award-nominated actress Patricia Clarkson; Dylan McDermott; actress Taylor Schilling; actress and comedian Regina Hall; Grammy-nominated singer-songwriter Lana Del Rey; Mary Higgins Clark, best-selling suspense novelist; horror novelist and playwright Robert Marasco; postmodern novelist Don DeLillo, acclaimed novelist and Pulitzer Prize nominee; Robert Sean Leonard, Golden Globe-winning television show actor; Bob Keeshan of TV's award-winning "Captain Kangaroo"; and John LaFarge, painter, muralist, and designer of stained-glass windows. John Gilmary Shea, regarded as the "Father of American Catholic History", is also an alumnus. Michael Alig, infamous club promoter of '90s New York City nightlife, also attended Fordham. Comic actor and voice artist "Bill Lobley" is an alumnus as well.

People from the world of sports who attended Fordham include Baseball Hall of Fame inductee Frankie Frisch (the "Fordham Flash"); Vince Lombardi, football coaching legend; Bill Chadwick, Hockey Hall of Fame inductee; Tom Courtney, two-time Olympic gold medalist and holder of the world record in the 880-yard run; and Steve Bellán, the first Latin American to play Major League Baseball.

== In popular culture ==
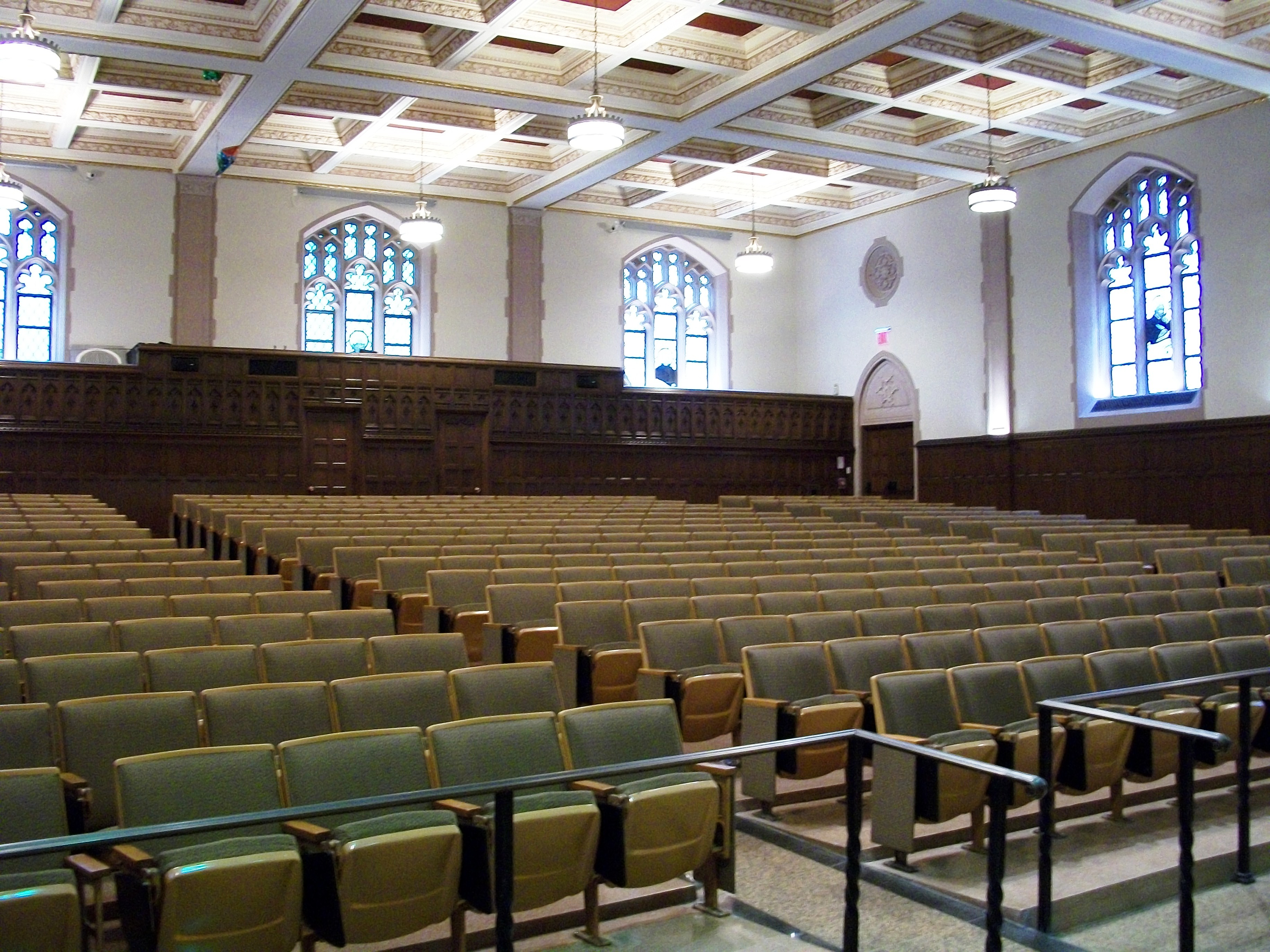
Keating Hall Auditorium, popular filming location at Rose Hill

Fordham's Rose Hill campus was named the second most-filmed campus in North America by Noodle Education in 2017. Films shot on the campus include: The Adjustment Bureau (2011), A Beautiful Mind (2001), Cheerleaders Beach Party (1978), The Exorcist (1973), Fair Game (2010), The Gambler (1974), Godspell (1973), Kinsey (2004), Love Story (1970), Quiz Show (1994), Solitary Man (2009), The Verdict (1982), and Wall Street 2: Money Never Sleeps (2010). The 1993 crime drama A Bronx Tale is set in the Belmont neighborhood adjacent to the Rose Hill campus. The Lincoln Center campus appeared in Awake (2007) and Center Stage (2000).

Television programs filmed at Fordham include Shattered Vows, a 1984 television film starring Valerie Bertinelli, which portrays the true story of a young nun in the 1960s who goes to Fordham for her master's degree and falls in love with a priest; White Collar; Naked City; Saturday Night Live; Chappelle's Show; and the 2009 U2 performance on Good Morning America. The series Forever features the new Gabelli building and McMahon dorm. In the second episode of CBS's Madam Secretary the Fordham commons are used in two scenes serving in lieu of Georgetown University. Scenes from the Amazon Prime show The Marvelous Mrs. Maisel were filmed on Edward's Parade in 2022.

== See also ==
- List of Jesuit educational institutions
