= List of Fordham University faculty =

The following is a partial list of current and former notable faculty of Fordham University in New York City.

== Faculty ==
- Joseph Abboud
- Abraham Abramovsky
- JoAnne Akalaitis
- Meena Alexander
- Anne Anastasi
- Bruce Andrews
- Robert Araujo
- Amy Aronson
- Babette Babich
- William F. Baker
- Bonnie Ballif-Spanvill
- Marleen S. Barr
- Deborah Batts
- Charles Beirne
- Hilaire Belloc
- Tina Benko
- Thomas V. Bermingham
- Daniel Berrigan
- Eugene Biel-Bienne
- Lawrence Boadt
- Louis F. Budenz
- David Budescu
- Gráinne de Búrca
- Deborah Burton
- Joseph Campbell
- Richard S. Carnell
- John A. Carpenter
- Sean Coffey
- Elaine Congress
- Cardinal Terence Cooke
- Vincent Cooke, S.J.
- Saul Cornell
- Cusi Cram
- Cynthia Cruz
- John M. Culkin
- Marcus Daly
- Brian Davies
- Richard Digby Day
- Joanne Dobson
- Alphonsus J. Donlon
- Cardinal Avery Dulles
- Mario Einaudi
- John Feerick
- Celia B. Fisher
- Joseph Fitzmyer
- Alison Fraser
- Sarah Gambito
- Michael J. Garanzini
- Richard Goldstone
- James Goodale
- Jennifer Gordon
- Robert E. Gould
- John Greco
- Karen J. Greenberg
- Benedict Groeschel, C.F.R.
- Ernest van den Haag
- Oskar Halecki
- George Haley
- Garth Risk Hallberg
- Abigail M. Harris
- Stephen McKinley Henderson
- Karl Herzfeld
- Elizabeth Hess
- Victor Francis Hess
- Dietrich von Hildebrand
- Ross J. S. Hoffman
- Olivia Hooker
- Jean Houston
- Deal W. Hudson
- Mehrdad Izady
- Eloisa James
- Morgan Jenness
- Elizabeth Johnson
- Daniel Alexander Jones
- Vytautas Kazimieras Jonynas
- Carl Jung
- Ani Kalayjian
- Merle Keitel
- Barbara Kellerman
- Joseph Koterski
- Lawrence Kramer
- Erik von Kuehnelt-Leddihn
- Vladimir Kvint
- Brian Leftow
- Paul Levinson
- C. Eric Lincoln
- Rick Lombardo
- Mark S. Massa
- Betsy McCoach
- Bryan Joseph McEntegart
- Francis Patrick McFarland
- Christopher C. McGrath
- Marshall McLuhan
- Georgia L. McMurray
- John J. McNeill
- Margaret Mead
- Thomas Patrick Melady
- John Meyendorff
- Pietro Montana
- John Muller
- Mark Naison
- Diana Villiers Negroponte
- Robert Cummings Neville
- Cardinal Patrick O'Boyle
- Vincent O'Keefe, S.J.
- William O'Malley, S.J.
- Terry A. Osborn
- Guillermo Owen
- Harley Parker
- Joseph G. Ponterotto
- Phylicia Rashad
- Donna Redel
- Cornelius L. Reid
- William L. Reilly
- Charles E. Rice
- Patrick Ryan
- Susan Scafidi
- Seungpil Yu
- John P. Shanley
- Dinesh Sharma
- Clare Shore
- Asif Azam Siddiqi
- George Bundy Smith
- John E. Sprizzo
- Herbert G. Squiers
- John Stallo
- Werner Stark
- Jordan Alexander Stein
- Peter Steinfels
- E. Mark Stern
- James A.F. Stoner
- Harold Takooshian
- Charles C. Tansill (1890–1964), professor of History at Fordham University 1939–1944
- Zephyr Teachout
- Nicholas Timasheff
- Bradley Tusk
- Judith Vladeck
- Jeffrey P. von Arx
- Marguerite Young
- Milan Zeleny

== Former presidents ==
1. Cardinal John McCloskey 1841–43
2. Rev. Ambrose Manahan 1843
3. Rev. John B. Harley 1844–1845
4. Most Rev. James Roosevelt Bayley 1845–46
5. Rev. Augustus Thébaud, S.J. 1846–51 and 1859–63
6. Rev. John Larkin, S.J. 1851–54
7. Rev. Rémi-Joseph Tellier, S.J. 1854–59
8. Rev. Edward Doucet, S.J. 1863–65
9. Rev. William Moylan, S.J. 1865–68
10. Rev. Joseph Shea S.J. 1868–74
11. Rev. William Gockeln, S.J. 1874–82
12. Rev. Patrick F. Dealy, S.J. 1882–85
13. Rev. Thomas F. Campbell, S.J. 1885–88 and 1896–1900
14. Rev. John Scully, S.J. 1888–91
15. Rev. Thomas Gannon, S.J. 1891–96
16. Rev. George A. Pettit, S.J. 1900–04
17. Most Rev. John J. Collins, S.J. 1904–06
18. Rev. Daniel J. Quinn, S.J. 1906–11
19. Rev. Thomas J. McCluskey, S.J. 1911–15
20. Rev. Joseph A. Mulry, S.J. 1915–19
21. Rev. Edward P. Tivnan, S.J. 1919–24
22. Rev. William J. Duane, S.J. 1924–30
23. Rev. Aloysius J. Hogan, S.J. 1930–36
24. Rev. Robert I. Gannon, S.J. 1936–49
25. Rev. Laurence J. McGinley, S.J. 1949–63
26. Rev. Vincent T. O'Keefe, S.J. 1963–65
27. Rev. Leo J. McLaughlin, S.J. 1965–69
28. Rev. Michael P. Walsh, S.J. 1969–72
29. Rev. James C. Finlay, S.J. 1972–83
30. Rev. Joseph A. O'Hare, S.J. 1983–2003
31. Rev. Joseph M. McShane, S.J. 2003–2022

Commencement speakers 1941–present

== See also ==
- Category:Fordham University faculty
