= List of presidents of Fordham University =

The following is a list of the presidents of Fordham University, from its establishment as St. John's College onward. From 1841 to 1846, the university was governed by the Archdiocese of New York, and was placed in the custody of the Society of Jesus thereafter.

== Presidents ==
=== Archdiocese of New York ===
Name	Image	Years presided	Ref.
Fr. John McCloskey		1841–43	
Fr. John B. Harley		1843–44	
Fr. James Roosevelt Bayley		1844–46	

=== Society of Jesus ===
==== 1846–1962 ====
Name	Image	Years presided	Ref.
Fr. Augustus Thébaud		1846–1851	
Fr. John Larkin		1851–1854	
Fr. Remigius I. Tellier		1854–1859	
Fr. Augustus Thébaud		1859–1863	
Fr. Edward Doucet		1863–1865	
Fr. William Moylan		1865–1868	
Fr. Joseph Shea		1868–1874	
Fr. F. William Gockeln		1874–1882	
Fr. Patrick F. Dealy		1882–1885	
Fr. Thomas J. Campbell		1885–1888	
Fr. John Scully		1888–1891	
Fr. Thomas Gannon		1891–1896	
Fr. Fr. Thomas J. Campbell		1896–1900	
Fr. John A. Petit		1900–1904	
Fr. John J. Collins		1904–1906	
Fr. Daniel J. Quinn		1906–1911	
Fr. Thomas J. McCluskey		1911–1915	
Fr. Joseph A. Mulry		1915–1919	
Fr. Edward P. Tivnan		1919–1924	
Fr. William J. Duane		1924–1930	
Fr. Aloysius J. Hogan		1930–1936	
Fr. Robert I. Gannon		1936–1949	
Fr. Laurence J. McGinley		1949–1963	

==== 1963–present ====
Name	Image	Years presided	Ref.
Fr. Vincent O'Keefe		1963–1965	
Fr. Leo P. McLaughlin		1965–1969	
Fr. Michael P. Walsh		1969–1972	
Fr. James C. Finlay		1972–1983	
Fr. Joseph A. O'Hare		1983–2003	
Fr. Joseph M. McShane		2003–2022 (named President Emeritus in 2022)	
Tania Tetlow		2022–present	

== See also ==
- History of Fordham University
