= History of Fordham University =

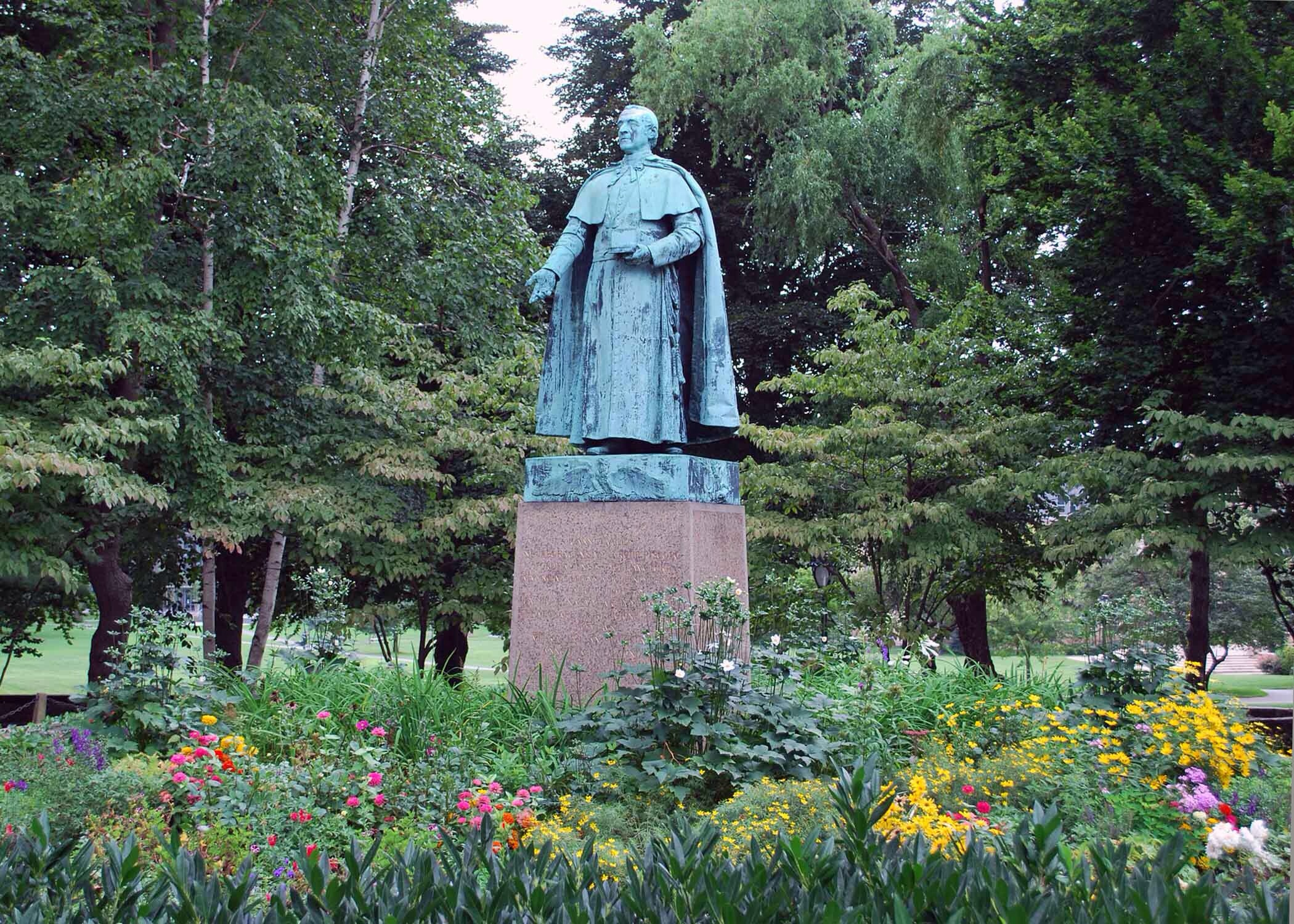
Statue of John Hughes, founder of Fordham University, at the Rose Hill campus; the statue was presented on June 24, 1891.

The history of Fordham University spans over 175 years, from the university's beginnings as St. John's College in 1841, to its establishment as Fordham University, and to its clerical independence in the mid-twentieth century. Fordham is the oldest Roman Catholic institution of higher education in the northeastern United States, and the third-oldest university in the state of New York, after New York University and Columbia University.

== History ==
=== Establishment as St. John's College ===
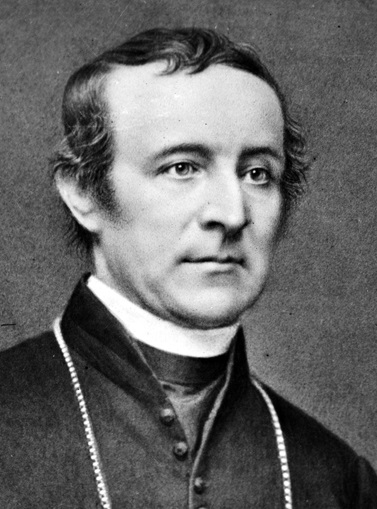
John Hughes, Archbishop of New York and founder of St. John's College at Fordham.

In September 1840, the Irish-born coadjutor bishop (later archbishop) of the Diocese of New York, the Most Reverend John J. Hughes, purchased the bulk of Rose Hill Manor, a private farm in the village of Fordham, New York (located in present-day the Bronx, New York City), for slightly less than $30,000 with the intent of establishing St. Joseph's Seminary following the model of Mount Saint Mary's University of which he was an alumnus. "Rose Hill" was the name originally given to the site in 1787 by its owner, Robert Watts, a wealthy New York merchant, in honor of his family's ancestral home in Scotland.

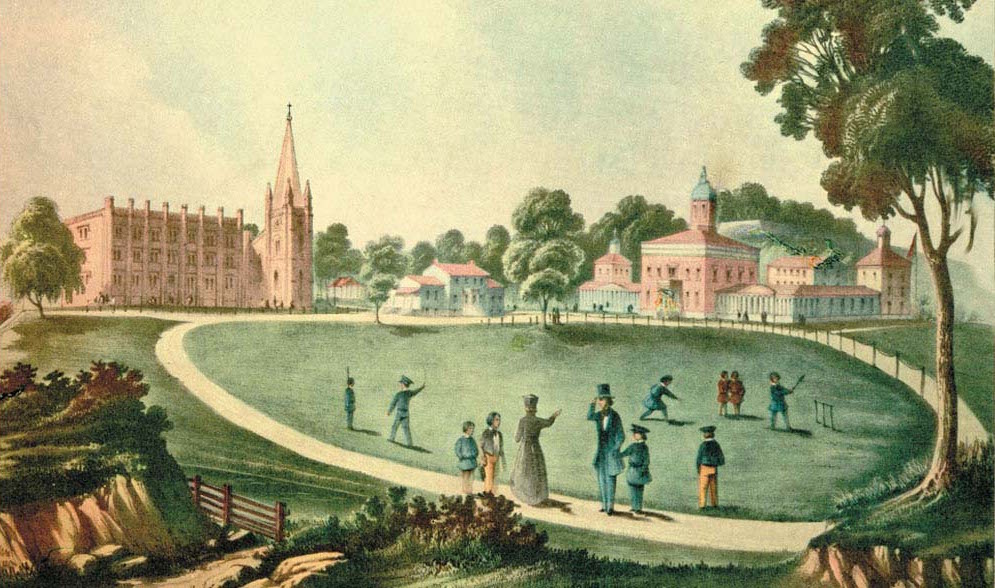
St. John's College, 1846.

St. John's College was officially founded in 1841 by Hughes, and the seminary was paired with St. John's College, which opened at Rose Hill with a student body of six on June 24, 1841, the feast day of Saint John the Baptist (as well as Hughes' birthday). The Reverend John McCloskey (later archbishop of New York and eventually the first American cardinal) was the school's first president, and the faculty were secular priests and lay instructors. The college presidency went through a succession of four diocesan priests in five years, including the Rev. James Roosevelt Bayley, a distant cousin of Theodore and Franklin D. Roosevelt and a nephew of St. Elizabeth Ann Seton. In 1845, the seminary church, Our Lady of Mercy, was built. The same year, Bishop Hughes convinced several Jesuit priests from the St. Mary's Colleges in Maryland and Kentucky to staff St. John's.

On April 10, 1846, the New York state legislature granted the college the power to "confer such literary honors, degrees, and diplomas as are usually granted by any university, college or seminary of learning in the United States." In June, the university was purchased by the Fathers of the Society of Jesus. Bishop Hughes deeded the college over but retained title to the seminary property, about nine acres. In 1847, Fordham's first school in Manhattan opened. The school became the independently chartered College of St. Francis Xavier in 1861. It was also in 1847 that the American poet Edgar Allan Poe arrived in the village of Fordham and began a friendship with the college Jesuits that would last throughout his life. In 1849, he published his famed work "The Bells." Some traditions credit the college's church bells as the inspiration for this poem. Poe also spent considerable time in the Fordham (then St. John's) Library, and even occasionally stayed overnight.

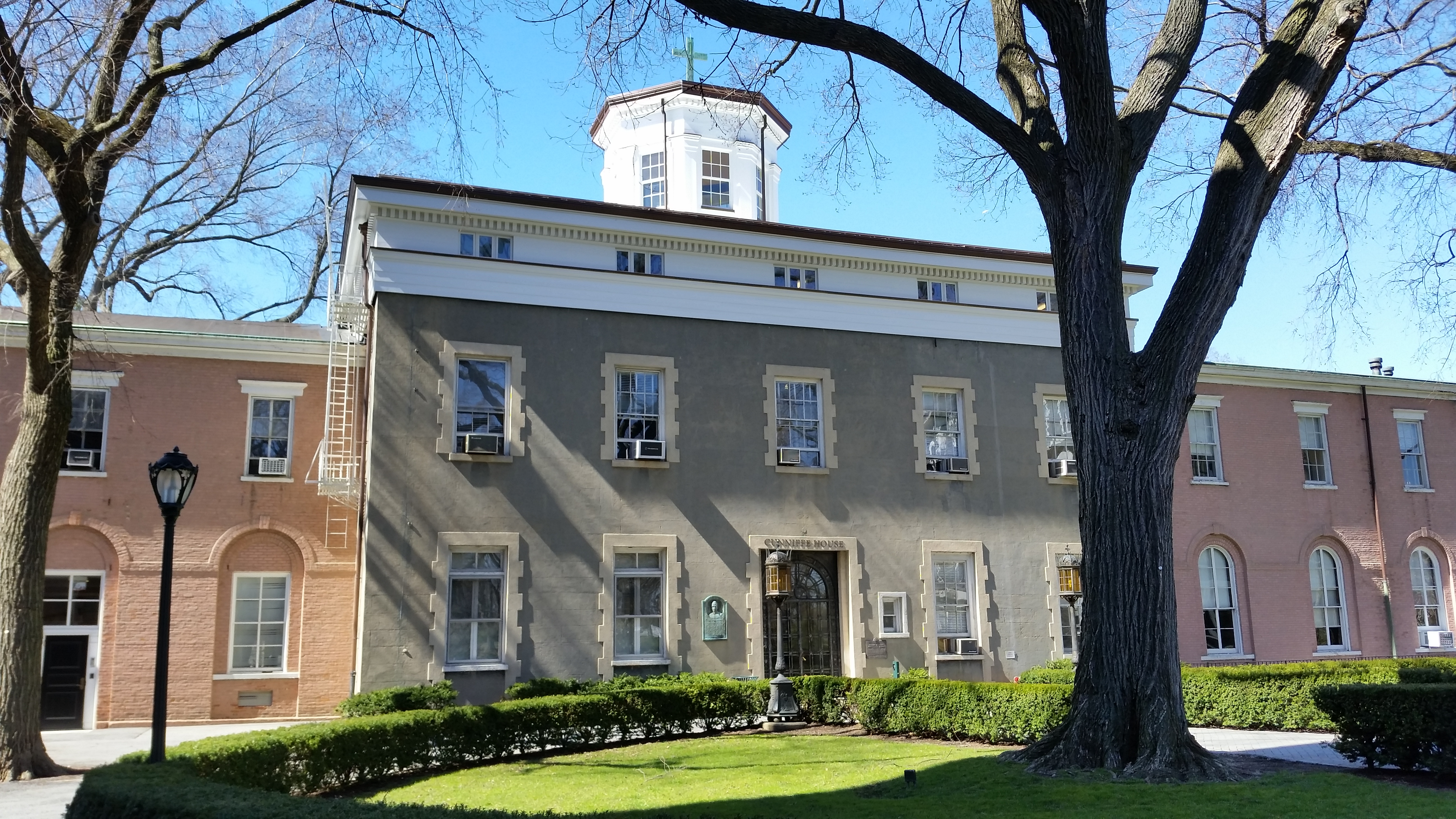
Cunniffe House, constructed in 1836, is one of the original buildings from Rose Hill Manor.

St. John's curriculum consisted of a junior division (i.e. the preparatory school), requiring four years of study in Latin, Greek, grammar, literature, history, geography, mathematics, and religion; and a senior division (i.e. the college), requiring three years study in "poetry" (humanities), rhetoric, and philosophy. Per a 1920 General Catalogue published by the university, the curriculum's basis in Jesuit values was foundational to its academic ethos, which:

Aims at developing, side by side, the moral and intellectual faculties of the student, and sending forth to the world men of sound judgment, of acute and rounded intellect, of upright and manly conscience. And since men are not made better citizens by the mere accumulation of knowledge, without a guiding and controlling force, the principal faculties to be developed are the moral faculties. Moreover, morality is to be taught continuously; it must be the vital force animating the whole organic structure of education.

In the fall of 1854, the St. Johns' College Debating Society was organized, and the following year, on December 3, 1855, the first student stage production, Henry IV, was presented, followed by The Seven Clerks. The seminary was closed in 1859, and the property was sold to the Jesuits in 1860 for $40,000. A Congressional act creating instruction in military science and tactics at the college level resulted in St. John's bringing a cadet corps to campus. In 1865, Reverend William Moylan, S.J., was elected as the university's ninth president. Moylan, a native of Ireland, had taught at Fordham prior in 1851 before relocating to teach in San Francisco, California, returning to New York in 1864. From 1885 to 1890, a veteran of the 7th U.S. Cavalry, Lt. Herbert C. Squires, built a cadet battalion to a strength of 200, which would provide the foundation for the modern ROTC unit at Fordham.

The college built a science building in 1886, lending more legitimacy to science in the curriculum; on June 24, 1891, a copper memorial statue of Bishop Hughes was presented to the university, which still exists today just west of the Cuniffe House. In addition, a three-year Bachelor of Science degree was created. In 1897, academic regalia for students at Commencement was first adopted.

=== Expansion and re-naming ===
School	Year founded
Fordham College (Rose Hill)	1841
School of Law	1905
Fordham College (Lincoln Center)	1913
Graduate School of Arts and Sciences	1916
Graduate School of Education	1916
Graduate School of Social Service	1916
Gabelli School of Business	1920
School of Professional and Continuing Studies	1944
Graduate School of Religion and Religious Education	1969

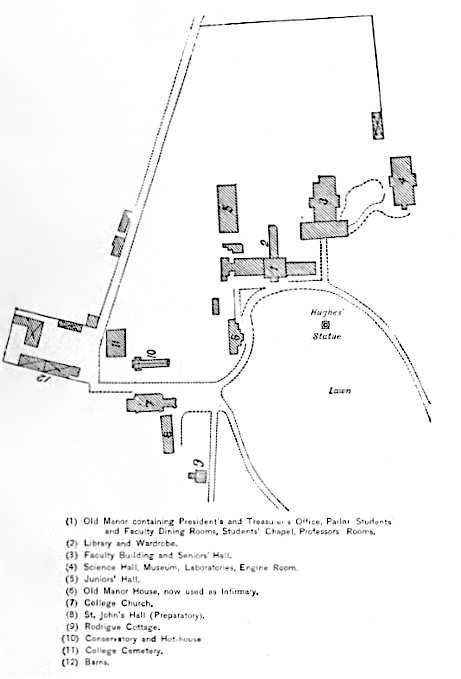
Map of Rose Hill, 1891.

After the turn of the 20th century, the university began to expand considerably, opening several new schools as well as changing its name. On June 21, 1904, with the consent of the Regents of the University of the State of New York, the board of trustees authorized the opening of both a law and medical school. St. John's College officially became Fordham University on March 7, 1907. The name Fordham refers to the village of Fordham, in which the original Rose Hill campus is located. The village, in turn, drew its name from its location near a shallow crossing of the Bronx River ("ford by the hamlet"). When Fordham and several other Westchester County towns were consolidated into the Bronx at the turn of the twentieth century, the village became the borough's Fordham neighborhood. Still in existence today, it is located just to the west of the Rose Hill campus.

In 1908, Fordham University Press was established. In 1912, the university opened the College of Pharmacy, which offered a three-year program in pharmacy. Not requiring its students to obtain bachelor's degrees until the late 1930s, the college had a mainly Jewish student body, and in recognition of that, the students were exempted from the then-required course in Catholic theology. In September 1912, the Swiss psychiatrist and psychoanalyst, Carl Jung delivered at series of lectures at Fordham which marked his historic break with the theories of his colleague Sigmund Freud.

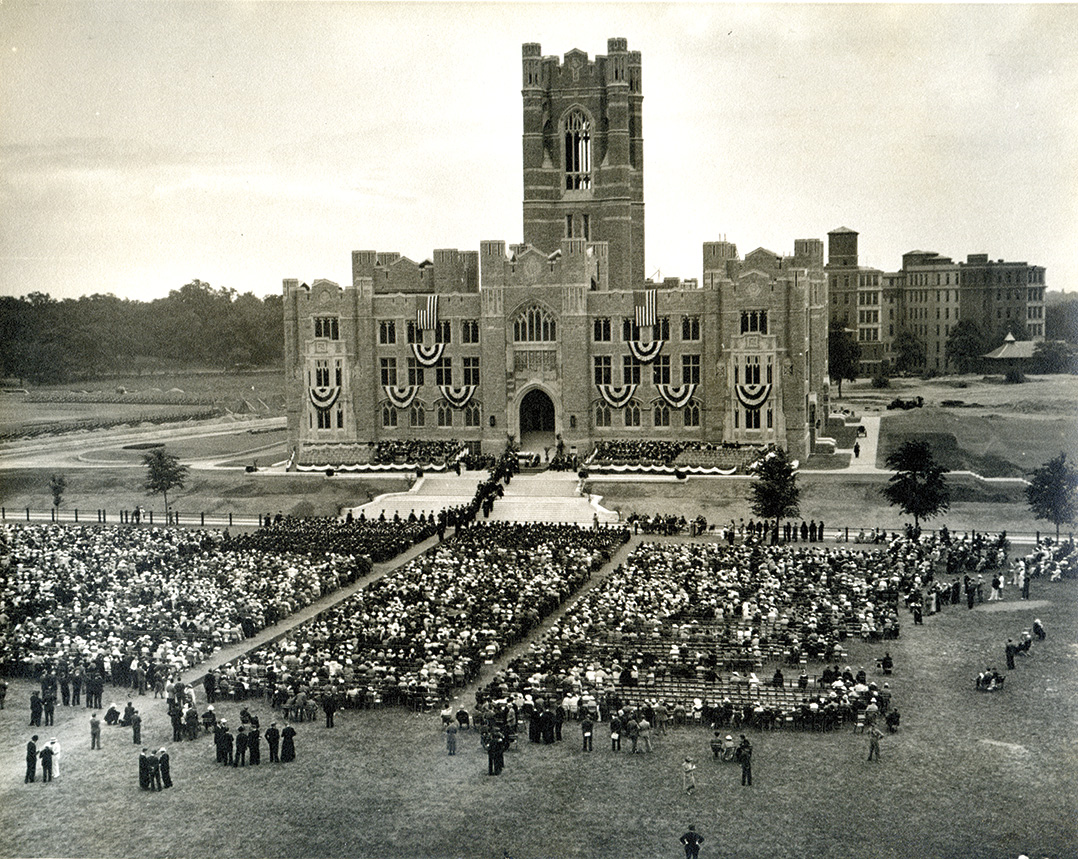
First commencement ceremony at Keating Hall, June 10, 1936.

The College of St. Francis Xavier was closed in 1913, and various Fordham colleges were opened at the Woolworth Building in Manhattan to fill the void. Some divisions of the University including the law school were later moved to "the Vincent Astor Building" at 302 Broadway, This commenced an unbroken string of instruction in Manhattan that became what is now Fordham College at Lincoln Center, where all of Fordham's Manhattan academic operations are centered today.

The university closed its medical school in 1919, citing a lack of endowment and reduced university funds overall due to the First World War. The Gabelli School of Business began in 1920 in Manhattan as the School of Accounting. According to a university catalogue from 1920, the annual cost for tuition, room and board at the college was $600 (equivalent to $9,418 in 2024). Beginning in the 1920–21 calendar year, all students attending the university who did not reside with parents or immediate relatives were required to live in the university's residence halls.

In 1944, the School of Professional and Continuing Studies was established, largely bolstered by returning veterans taking advantage of the GI Bill.

Though first established in 1882, Fordham gained a significant amount of national renown from its football program in the early 20th century. Fordham football played on some of the largest stages in sports, including games in front of sellout crowds at the Polo Grounds and Yankee Stadium, a Cotton Bowl appearance and a Sugar Bowl victory, as well as producing the famed Seven Blocks of Granite (including Vince Lombardi). On September 30, 1939, Fordham participated in the world's first televised football game, defeating Waynesburg College, 34–7. The university discontinued the program during World War II, reinstating it in 1946. However, it proved much less successful and too expensive to maintain, and was again discontinued in 1954, though would revive yet again as an NCAA Division III team in 1970 and Division I team in 1989.

=== Clerical independence; Lincoln Center ===
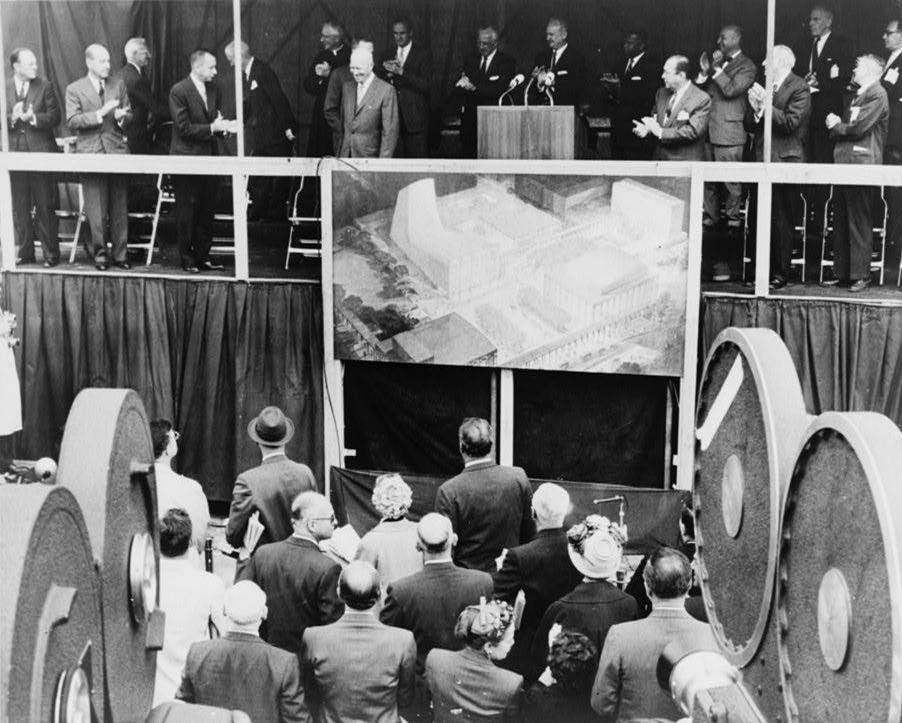
President Dwight D. Eisenhower at launching of Lincoln Center campus, 1959.

In 1961, the Lincoln Center campus opened as part of the Lincoln Square Renewal Project. The School of Law was the first to occupy the new campus, but the academic programs at 302 Broadway were moved to the new location in 1969. At Rose Hill, the all-female Thomas More College began instruction in 1964.

In the late 1950s, as the Civil Rights Movement gathered momentum in the US, Fordham students and school officials expressed ambivalence about racial justice. In the late 1960s, Fordham became a center of political activism and countercultural activity. At the Rose Hill Campus, the Fordham branch of Students for a Democratic Society organized opposition to the existence of the ROTC and military recruiters. During this period, students routinely organized protests and class boycotts and used psychoactive drugs on campus open spaces. In response to internal demands for a more "liberalized" curriculum, the university created Bensalem College in 1967. An experimental college with no set requirements and no grades, it was studied by a wide array of educators and reported on by such large-circulation publications of the day as Look, Esquire and the Saturday Review. The school closed in 1974. In 1969, students organized a sit-in on the main road leading to Rose Hill in response to an announcement that President Richard Nixon would be speaking on campus. As a result of the sit-in, Nixon was forced to cancel his plans to speak. A year later, students stormed the main administration building, occupying it for several weeks, and set fire to the Rose Hill faculty lounge. It was during this period of activism that the university's African and African American Studies Department, one of the first black studies departments in the nation, as well as the paper, the leftist student newspaper on campus, were founded.

In 1969, the board of trustees was reorganized to include a majority of nonclerical members, which officially made the university an independent institution. While the Jesuit order thereby lost full control of Fordham, the board of trustees continues to officially describe the institution as a "Jesuit, Catholic university." The College of Pharmacy closed due to declining enrollment in 1972. Fordham College at Rose Hill merged with Thomas More College in 1974, becoming coeducational.

Fordham Preparatory School, a four-year, all-male college preparatory school, was once integrated with the university and shares its founding. It became legally independent in 1972 and moved to its own facilities on the northwest corner of the Rose Hill campus; however, the school remains connected to the university in many ways.

In 1993, a twenty-story residence hall was added to the Lincoln Center campus to house 850 students. In 1996, the campus's undergraduate college changed its name to "Fordham College at Lincoln Center," having been called "The Liberal Arts College" and later "The College at Lincoln Center" since its creation in 1968.

=== Post-millennium ===
Marymount College, an independent women's college founded by the Religious of the Sacred Heart of Mary in 1907, was consolidated into Fordham in July 2002. The school had been steeped in financial hardship since the 1970s. Located 25 miles (40 km) north of Manhattan in Tarrytown, New York, the college remained open, and its campus received a branch of the School of Professional and Continuing Studies as well as extensions of the graduate schools for education, social service, and business administration.

In 2005, Fordham announced that Marymount College would be phased out; it awarded degrees to its final undergraduate class in May 2007. University administrators indicated that the campus would remain open for Fordham graduate programs in several disciplines.

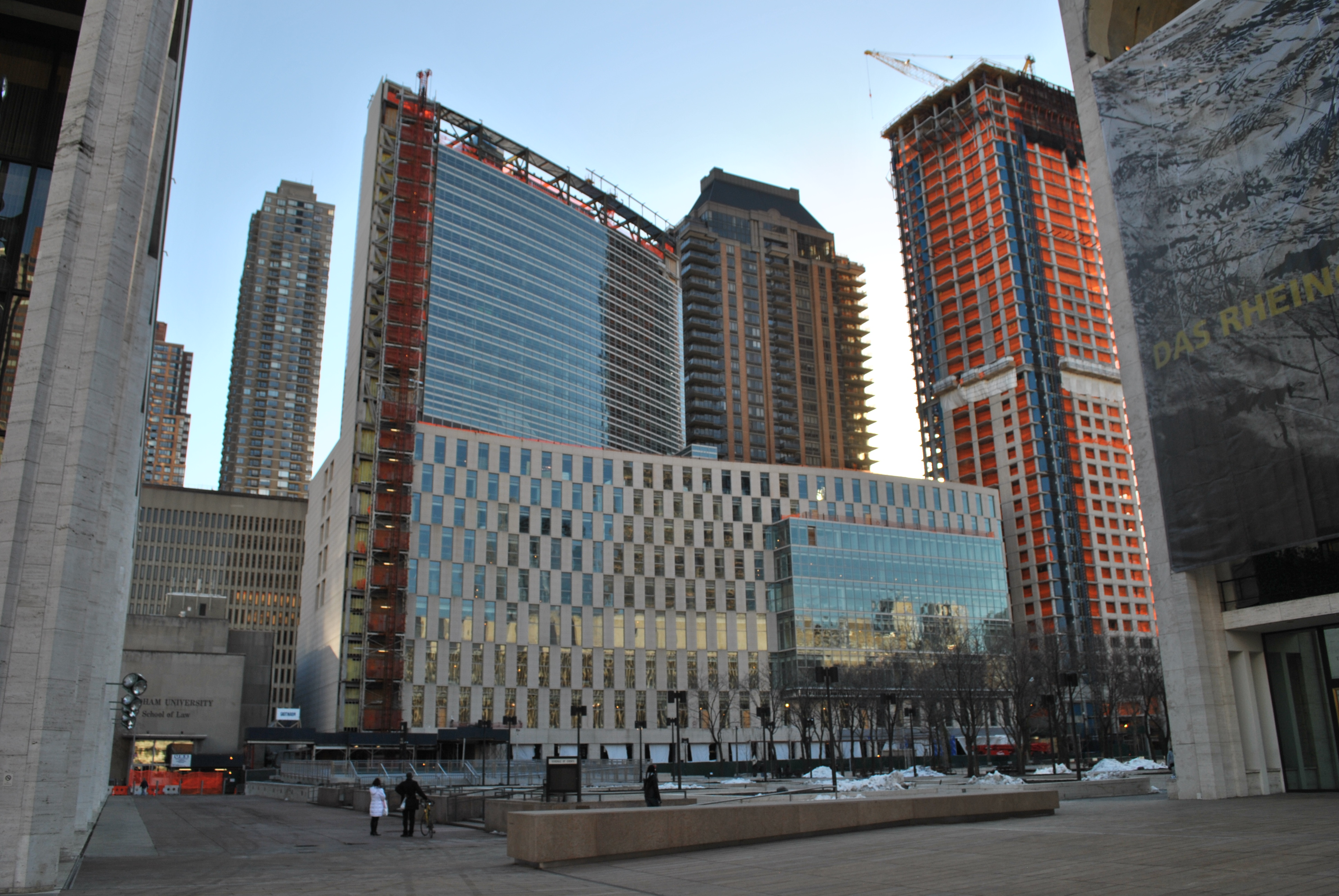
School of Law building at Lincoln Center campus.

In the autumn of 2007, however, the university announced its intention to seek buyers for the Marymount campus. Administrators stated that the expenses required to support the programs at the campus far exceeded their demand. University officials estimated that the revenue gained from the proposed sale would not be greater than the expenses incurred maintaining and improving the campus since the merger with Marymount. President McShane stated that the university's decision was nonetheless a "painful" one. Fordham then indicated its intention to move the remaining programs from the Marymount campus to a new location in Harrison, New York by the autumn of 2008. On February 17, 2008, the university announced the sale of the campus for $27 million to EF Schools, a chain of private language instruction schools.

In 2014, the university successfully completed a five-year, $500 million campaign, surpassing expectations by raising more than $540 million over the five-year period. The university is currently in the midst of a renovation and expansion of its Lincoln Center campus. In 2014, the university opened a newly renovated Law School, as well as an additional undergraduate dormitory, McKeon Hall. The former law school building was renovated to expand the Quinn Library and give the Gabelli School of Business a home in Manhattan. Long-term plans are under consideration for a new library building, as well as buildings to house the Graduate School of Social Service and the Graduate School of Education.

In 2022, Tania Tetlow was appointed president of Fordham University. She is the first woman and the first layperson to serve as president.

== See also ==
- List of presidents of Fordham University

== Works cited ==
- "Part II: Catalogue of St. John's College". General Catalogue of Fordham University. Vol. XIII. Fordham University. July 1920.
- Kurian, George Thomas; Lamport, Mark A. (eds.) (2015). Encyclopedia of Christian Education. Vol. 3. Rowman & Littlefield. ISBN 978-0-8108-8492-2. OCLC 881399583.
- Schroth, Raymond A. (2008). Fordham: A History and Memoir (Revised ed.). New York: Fordham University Press. ISBN 978-0-8232-2977-2. OCLC 727645703.
- Shelley, Thomas J. (2016). Fordham, A History of the Jesuit University of New York: 1841–2003. New York: Fordham University Press. ISBN 978-0-8232-7151-1. OCLC 6933280401.
- Taaffe, Thomas Gaffney (1891). A History of St. John's College, Fordham, N.Y. New York: The Catholic Publication Society Co.
