= Daniel Quinn (disambiguation) =

Daniel Quinn (1935–2018) was an American author.

Daniel Quinn may also refer to:

== Arts and entertainment ==
- Daniel Quinn (actor) (1956–2015), American actor
- Daniel Patrick Quinn (born 1981), British musician and mountain writer
- Dan W. Quinn (1859–1938), American singer
- Daniel Quinn (Paul Auster character), fictional writer in the novel City of Glass by Paul Auster
- Dan Quin or Alfred Henry Lewis (1855–1914), American journalist, writer, editor
- Danny Quinn (born 1964), Italian actor

== Sports ==
- Dan Quinn (American football) (born 1970), American football coach
- Dan Quinn (fighter) (born 1967), American MMA fighter and football player
- Dan Quinn (ice hockey) (born 1965), Canadian ice hockey player
- Daniel Quinn (rugby league) (born 1978), Australian rugby league footballer

== Others ==
- Daniel J. Quinn (1864–1940), president of Fordham University
