= Thomas J. Campbell (university president) =

12th and 14th president of Fordham University

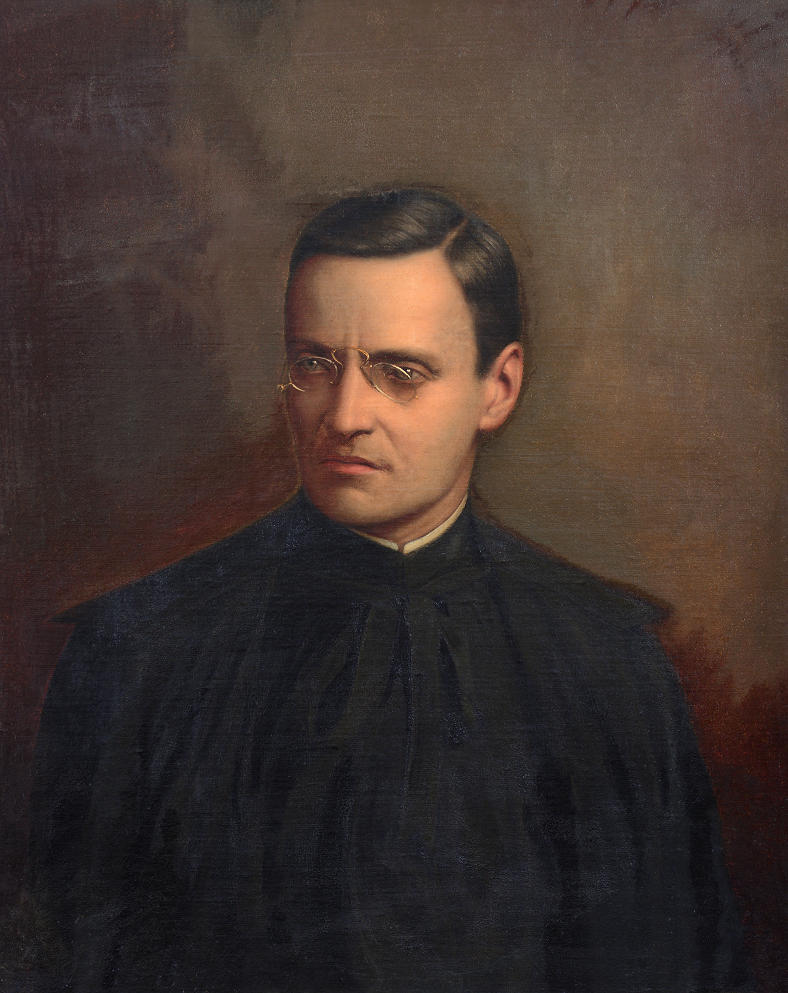

12th and 14th President of Fordham University
- In office 1885–1888
- Preceded by: Patrick F. Dealy
- Succeeded by: John Scully
- In office 1896–1900
- Preceded by: Thomas Gannon
- Succeeded by: George A. Pettit

Personal details
- Born: April 28, 1848; New York City, New York, U.S.
- Died: December 14, 1925 (aged 77); Monroe, New York, U.S.

Thomas Joseph Campbell (April 28, 1848 – December 14, 1925) was the twelfth and fourteenth president of St. John's College (now Fordham University).

== Early life ==
Campbell was born in New York City on April 29, 1848. He initially attended public schools in New York city, but later enrolled at St. Francis Xavier College. He received his Master of Arts in 1867, and entered the Jesuit novitiate in Sault-au-Recollet, Canada. In 1870 he was sent to St. John's College, where he taught classical literature for three years. Campbell continued his philosophical and scientific studies in Woodstock, Maryland. After completing his studies, he returned to St. Francis Xavier College to teach rhetoric in 1876. He left St. Francis in order to study French literature, ecclesiastical history, and theology at Louvain University, Belgium. He was ordained in 1881, and returned to Frederick, Maryland in the US to spend his third year of probation.

== St. John's – Fordham University ==
In 1885 he became the president of the college, and was the youngest president in over a hundred years. He continued the plans for a new science building, and during his administration the first bachelor of sciences degree was awarded. Campbell also wanted to help the mentally underprivileged by advocating a course in surveying. However, the new era seemed to end. During his presidency there is no mention of fencing or horsemanship, and the creation of the natatorium was delayed. In 1888 he was Provincial of the Jesuits' Maryland-New York Province, and remained there until 1893.

In 1893, Campbell was briefly a vice-rector of St. Francis Xavier College, and from 1893-1895 he spent his time giving missions and retreats. In 1896 he once again returned to St. John's College to reclaim his position as president. For the next four years he continued to focus on the enrollment of students, the small amount of scholarships and donations compared to other universities, and encouraged more dedication to the sciences until his retirement in 1900.

== Later years ==
After completing his presidency, Campbell focused on his literary career. He was one of the earliest historians to write about the Kentucky mission. He traveled to Canada for historical research and published his findings in The Pioneer Priests of North America and The Pioneer Laymen of North America. From 1908 to 1910 he was the English preacher at the Church of the Immaculate Conception in Montreal. He contributed a number of articles to the Catholic Encyclopedia, in particular, many relating to early priests in North America.

From 1910 to 1914 he was an editor of America. He then returned to St. Francis Xavier Church in 1916 before leaving and working at St. Joseph's Church, Philadelphia, Pennsylvania. Campbell then returned to New York as lecturer at the St. John's Graduate School, where he specialized in American history. In 1921 he published The Jesuits, 1534–1921, and in 1925 he spent the remaining months of his life happily retired.

Campbell, aside from his general research and histories focusing on the Jesuits, was one of the first to write a history of Fordham.
