= Joseph G. Ponterotto =

American psychologist, author and professor

Joseph G. Ponterotto (born 1958) is an American psychologist, author, and professor. He serves as the coordinator of the Master's program in Mental Health Counseling at Fordham University's Graduate School of Education. He is a licensed psychologist and mental health counselor in New York State and is a former Associate Editor of the Journal of Counseling Psychology.

== Biography ==
Joseph G. Ponterotto was born in 1958 and raised in the Bronx, New York City. He is the fifth of six children born to an Italian-American family. In 1976, he enrolled at Iona College in New Rochelle, New York, earning a Bachelor of Arts in psychology in 1980. He subsequently attended the University of California, Santa Barbara, where he entered the counseling psychology graduate program.

During his studies, Ponterotto worked with Jesus Manuel Casas, (Note: Currently retired from the University of California, Santa Barbara as one of the senior Chicano professors in the UC system.) who encouraged his transition to the doctoral program. This collaboration initiated Ponterotto's focus on multicultural counseling. Between 1981 and 1985, he collaborated with Casas on research concerning the Chicano community, exploring themes of privilege, acculturation, and inequality. Ponterotto has cited this period as significant in his examination of his own heritage and bilingualism in relation to professional identity. Casas served as the chair for Ponterotto's doctoral dissertation, which examined the effects of parental variables and teacher-child interaction on the academic performance of low-income Mexican-American children.

Ponterotto has noted that his early professional development was influenced by scholars in multicultural research, including Thomas Parham, Janet E. Helms, William Cross, Derald Wing Sue, and Casas.

He has focused on the utility of qualitative methods in studying multicultural populations. Ponterotto has attributed his interest in connecting qualitative research with multicultural counseling to his academic environment at Fordham University, citing the influence of colleagues such as Leo Goldman and Merle Keitel.

== Career ==
From 1985 to 1987, Ponterotto was an assistant professor of Counseling Psychology in the Department of Educational Psychology at the University of Nebraska–Lincoln. In 1987, he joined the faculty at Fordham University's Graduate School of Education as an assistant professor of Counseling Psychology within the Division of Psychological and Educational Services (PES). He was subsequently promoted to Associate Professor and then Professor. He currently coordinates the master's degree program in Mental Health Counseling.

Ponterotto instructs master's and doctoral students in school psychology, clinical psychology, mental health counseling, and counseling psychology. His teaching areas include multicultural counseling, psychological measurement and assessment, career counseling, quantitative and qualitative research methods, and the history of psychology.

=== Counseling and supervision ===
Ponterotto began his clinical work in 1981 as a graduate student at the University of California, Santa Barbara. In 1984, he served as the clinic coordinator and supervisor of the university's Counseling Psychology Training Clinic. He later worked as a counselor and supervisor at the Educational Psychology Training Clinic at the University of Nebraska–Lincoln (1985–1987), serving as its director from 1986 to 1987.

In 2008, he established a private psychotherapy practice in New York City. His practice focuses on the impact of socio-cultural contexts on individuals and career development. He has also worked with specialized clients, including chess prodigies.

== Awards and honors ==
Ponterotto was a co-recipient of the Early Career Scientist/Practitioner Award from Division 17 of the American Psychological Association (APA) in 1994. At Fordham University, he received the Distinguished Contribution to Multicultural Education Award (1997–1998) and the Scanlon Award (2003). In 2007, he received the Bene Merenti Award for 20 years of service to the university.

Other recognition includes the "Distinguished Alumnus-Research and Scholarship" honor from the Graduate School of Education at the University of California, Santa Barbara (2007), and the Visionary Leadership Award at the APA National Multicultural Conference and Summit. He also received the 17th Annual Janet E. Helms Award for Mentoring and Scholarship from Teachers College, Columbia University.

== Research contributions ==
Ponterotto is a former associate editor of the Journal of Counseling Psychology and has served on various editorial boards. He has published over 100 peer-reviewed journal articles, focusing on acculturation, racism, immigration, multicultural counseling, and qualitative and quantitative research methods.

His work emphasizes the use of qualitative inquiry, such as interviews, to research diverse ethnicities and cultures. In his 2005 article, "Qualitative Research in Counseling Psychology: A Primer on Research Paradigms and Philosophy of Science," he provided an overview of research paradigms and discussed the integration of qualitative methods in student training.

Ponterotto has co-developed several psychometric scales designed to address cultural and ethnic differences. These include the Quick Discrimination Index, the Teacher Multicultural Attitude Survey, the Multicultural Counseling Knowledge and Awareness Scale, and the Multicultural Personality Inventory.

=== Books ===
- The Psychobiographer's Handbook: A Practical Guide to Research and Ethics (2024)
- A Psychobiography of Bobby Fischer: Understanding the Genius, Mystery, and Psychological Decline of a World Chess Champion (2012)
- A Psychobiography of John F. Kennedy Jr.: Understanding His Inner Life, Achievements, Struggles, and Courage (2018)

Ponterotto's 2012 biography of Bobby Fischer was based on research that included interviews with family members, chess masters, and associates, as well as a review of archives and FBI files. Ponterotto served as a historical consultant for the 2015 film Pawn Sacrifice.
