= Edward R. Moore =

American Catholic priest and professor

Father Edward Roberts Moore
- Pastor of St. Peter's Roman Catholic Church
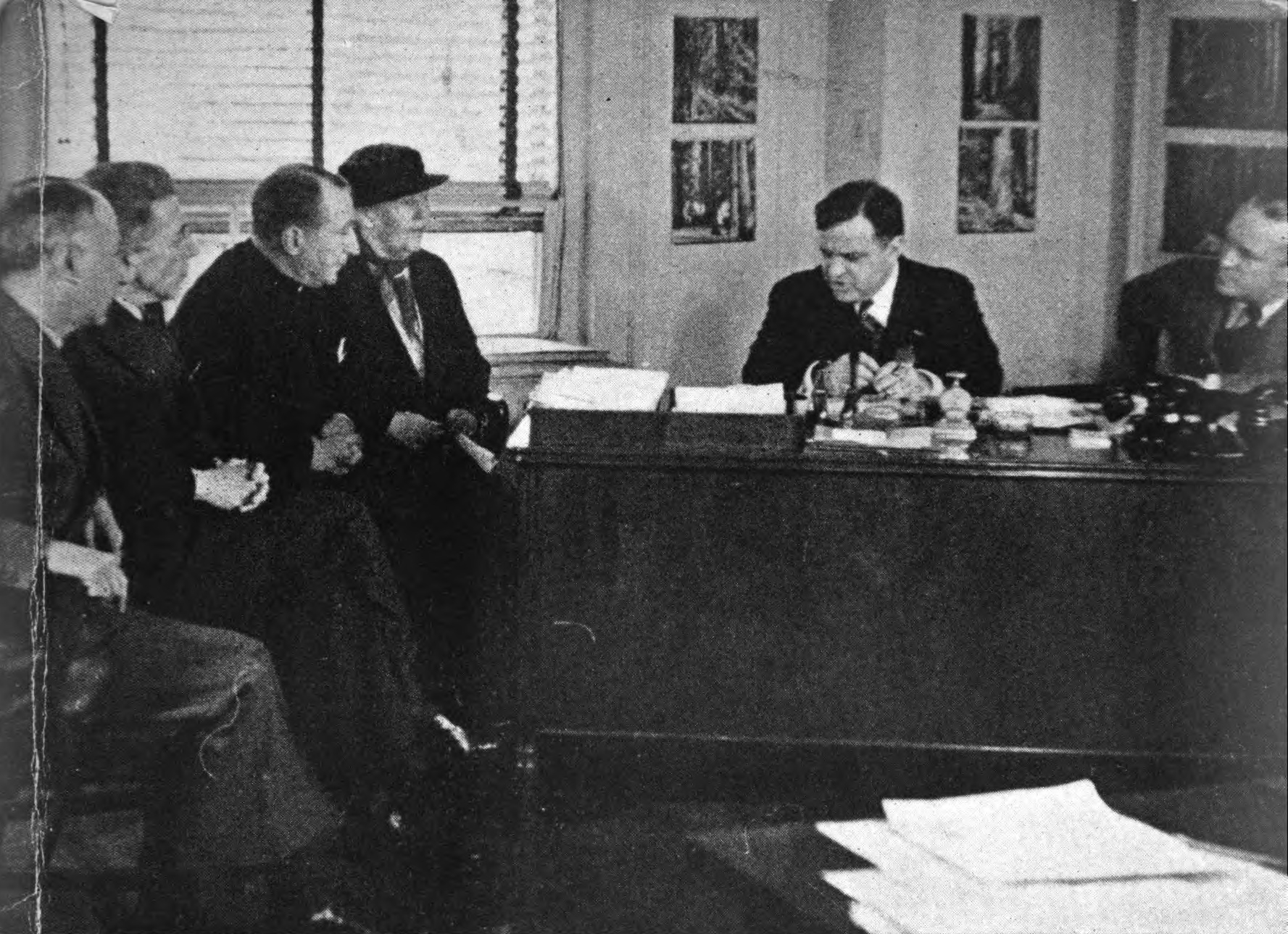
- Moore (third from left) and others from the New York City Housing Authority meet with mayor Fiorello La Guardia c. 1937
- Church: Roman Catholic Church
- Archdiocese: Archdiocese of New York

Orders
- Ordination: 1919
- Rank: Priest

Personal details
- Born: January 1, 1894
- Died: January 1, 1952 (aged 58)
- Denomination: Roman Catholic
- Occupation: Priest, Social Worker, Author, Professor
- Education: Professor at Fordham Graduate School of Social Service

Edward Roberts Moore (1894–1952) was a Catholic priest, professor, social worker and author. He served as pastor of historic St. Peter's Roman Catholic Church, New York from 1937 until his death in 1952. He was Director of the Division of Social Action of the Catholic Charities of the Catholic Archdiocese of New York.

== Social action ==
Ordained a priest in 1919, Moore was a professor at the Fordham Graduate School of Social Service before retiring from social work to devote his full attention to his duties as Pastor of St Peter's. Moore was a member of the city's Slum Clearance Committee under Mayor Fiorello La Guardia and a member of the first Board of the New York City Housing Authority in 1934. According to a history of the NYC housing authority, Moore "once escorted the former King of England, then the Duke of Windsor on a tour of Housing Authority Developments."

"Moore Houses" a New York City Housing Authority Development is named in honor of Moore and is located in the Melrose section of the Bronx.

== Youth work ==
A former Archdiocesan Director of the Catholic Youth Organization, Moore served as National Director of the Catholic Committee on Scouting from 1933 to 1947. In 1940 he was awarded the Silver Buffalo Award of the Boy Scouts of America.

== Works ==
- The Case Against Birth Control, The Century Co., NY, 1931
- Heart in Pilgrimage [dramatic novel of the life of Mother Seton, foundress of the Sisters of Charity], 1948
- Roman Collar, The Macmillan Company, NY 1950
