= John Scully =

John Scully may refer to:

- John Scully (Jesuit) (1846–1917), American Roman Catholic priest and president of Fordham University
- John Scully (American football) (born 1958), former American college and professional football player
- John Scully (journalist) (born 1941), Canadian author, producer and journalist
- Iceman John Scully (born 1967), American boxer
- John Sculley (born 1939), former Apple CEO
