= John Harllee =

John Harllee may refer to:

- John P. Harllee, member of the Florida House of Representatives
- John Harllee (admiral), United States Navy officer

== See also ==
- John Harley (disambiguation)
