= John Harley =

John Harley may refer to:

- John Harley (bishop, died 1558) (died 1558), earlier bishop of Hereford
- John Harley (bishop, died 1788) (1728–1788), dean of Windsor and bishop of Hereford
- John Pritt Harley (1786–1858), English comic actor
- John Harley (physician) (1833–1921), English physician, geologist, and botanist
- John Harley (footballer) (1886–1960), Scottish-born Uruguayan footballer
- John Brian Harley (1932–1991), geographer, cartographer, and map historian
- John B. Harley (died 1846), president of Fordham University, 1843–1845
- Jack Harley (John Laker Harley, 1911–1990), British biologist
