= Laurence J. McGinley =

Roman Catholic cleric and academic (1905–1992)

Lawrence J. McGinley (1905–1992) was a Roman Catholic cleric and academic who served as the twenty sixth President of Fordham University and was responsible along with New York City master builder Robert Moses for the University's second campus at Lincoln Center. Later in 1981 upon the passing of the "Power Broker "McGinley delivered one of the eulogies for Moses. His father James McGinley was the long time chief of staff to the Commissioner of Accounts for New York City.

Father McGinley saw a role for Fordham in its expansion to a second location the striking of a more metropolitan profile. He said "Fordham at Rose Hill will continue to have a campus of elm-lined paths and ivied walls and ancient academic heritage; Fordham at Lincoln Square will continue to provide the daily meeting and mingling of town and gown."

In 1986 the Laurence J. McGinley chair in religion and history was established at Fordham. Avery Cardinal Dulles occupied it from 1988 to 2008. In addition "Church and Society: The Laurence J. McGinley Lectures" delivered from 1988 to 2007 at Fordham were dedicated to him.

McGinley was known for his cosmopolitan bearing and the New York Times once called him "A New Yorker in the finest sense of the word?.
