= Fordham University Cemetery =

Historic cemetery at Fordham University

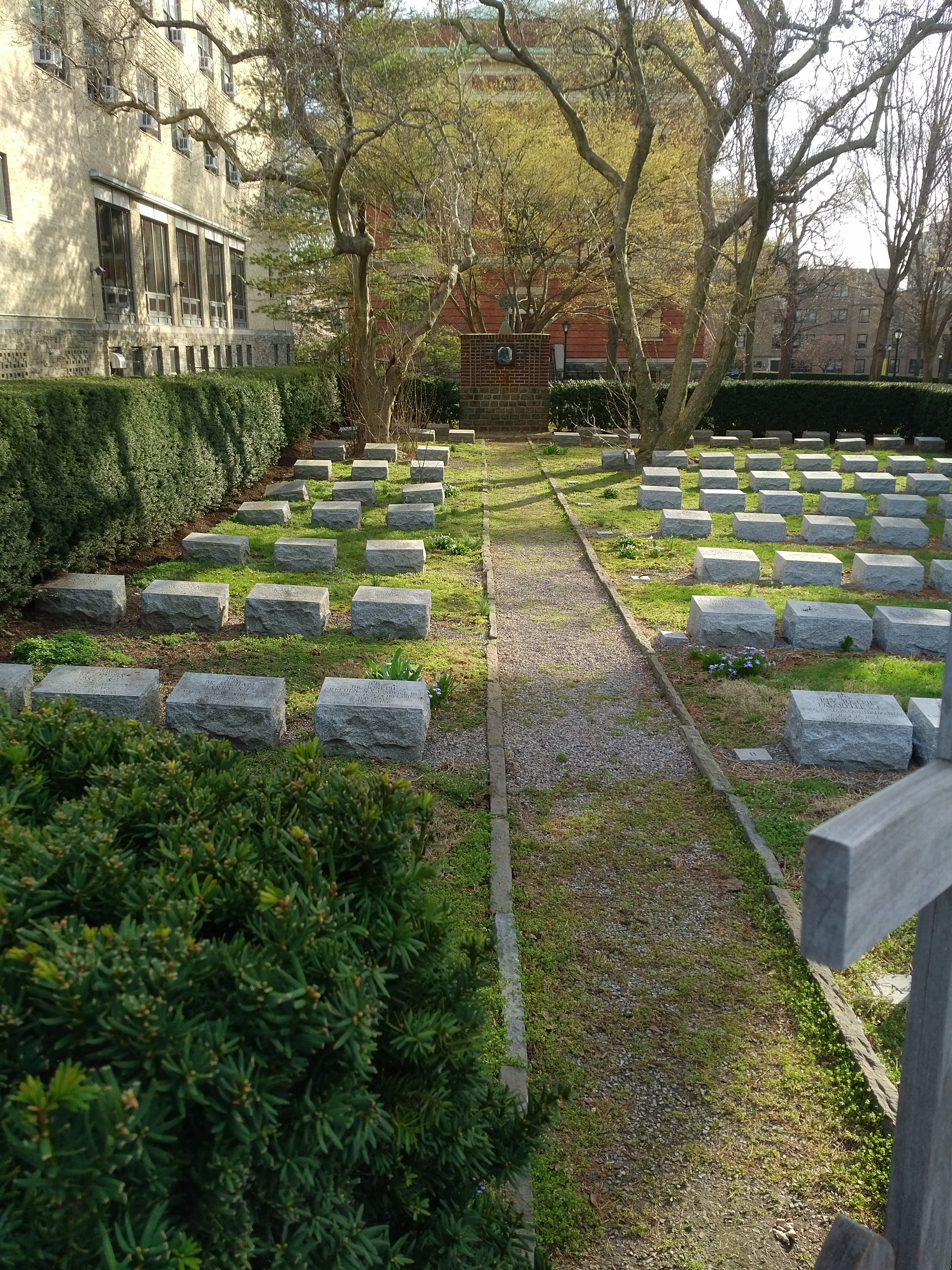
- Fordham University Cemetery in 2017

Details
- Established: 1847
- Location: Fordham University, The Bronx, New York City
- Coordinates: 40°51′48″N 73°53′09″W
- Type: Roman Catholic
- No. of graves: 138
- Find a Grave: Fordham University Cemetery

Fordham University Cemetery is a Catholic cemetery on the campus of Fordham University in the Bronx. Established in 1847, it was moved to its current location in 1890. The last burial occurred in 1909. The cemetery holds 138 graves, 124 of which contain the remains of Jesuits. The remainder were others associated with Fordham University or the Jesuit order.

== History ==
A cemetery was established on the eastern part of the campus of St. John's College (later Fordham University), with the first burial in the cemetery occurring on July 11, 1847. This part of the campus was seized in 1889 by the City of New York under the New Parks Act to create the New York Botanical Garden. The three Jesuits buried there were removed to a vault in Saint Raymond's Cemetery. In 1890, a new cemetery was established within the campus vineyard, next to the college church (later Fordham University Church). Seventy-five remains were transferred there, 61 of them Jesuits, nine students, three seminarians, and two workmen. The last burial in the cemetery occurred in 1909.

St. John's College officially became Fordham University in 1907. In the early 1950s, the gate to the cemetery was moved from the southern side to the northern, and a brick wall was built to enclose the southern side. In 1959, the remains of 38 Jesuits were relocated within the cemetery to allow for the construction of Faber Hall to the southeast. Eventually, the original marble gravestones had deteriorated, and the cemetery had become an eyesore. Some students erroneously believed that the cemetery was a "phantom cemetery" that contained no graves. In 1999, the gravestones were replaced with low-profile granite markers.

In 2000, a commemorative plaque was erected at the cemetery. It reads:

IN THEIR HOPE OF RESURRECTION HERE LIE THE REMAINS OF
124 SONS OF ST. IGNATIUS LOYOLA: 68 JESUIT PRIESTS;
44 JESUIT BROTHERS; 12 JESUIT SCHOLASTICS;
77 OF THEM HAD ASSIGNMENTS TO FORDHAM.
OTHERS BURIED IN THE SAME CEMETERY FOR WHOM AND WITH WHOM
THE JESUITS LABORED ARE: 3 DIOCESAN SEMINARIANS,
9 STUDENTS, AND 2 COLLEGE WORKMEN.
MAY THEY REST IN THE PEACE OF CHRIST.
Fr. Thomas Hennessy, S.J. February 7, 2001

== Notable interments ==
- Patrick F. Dealy, 11th president of St. John's College
- Alphonsus J. Donlon, 36th president of Georgetown University
- William Moylan, 9th president of St. John's College
- Samuel Mulledy, 21st president of Georgetown University
- Augustus Thébaud, 5th and first Jesuit president of St. John's College

== See also ==
- Campuses of Fordham University
