= Eco-map =

An eco-map (or ecomap) is a graphical representation that shows all of the systems at play in an individual's life. Eco-maps are used in individual and family counseling within the social work and nursing profession. They are often a way of portraying Systems Theory in a simplistic way that both the social worker and the client can look at during the session. These ecological maps, or ecomaps, were developed by Hartman in 1975 as a means of depicting the ecological system that encompasses a family or individual.

An ecogram is a combination of a genogram and an ecomap. The terms "ecogram" and "ecomap" are often used interchangeably, however.

A methodically related way to assess relationships in family therapy and research are Symbolic Figure Placement Techniques. These theranostic visualization methods (e.g., FAST, KFST) use figures on a board to represent cohesion and hierarchy in various settings.

== Symbols ==
At the center of the eco-map is the client (this can either be a family or individual). They are depicted in the center of the circle. Family connections are shown. There are also connections from all of the relevant systems that are at play in the clients life. These systems are connected to either individuals or the entire circle by line:

- Arrows pointing both direction depicts a two direction flow of influence
- Arrows pointing to the client mean that the system primarily influences the client
- Arrows pointing to the system mean that the client primarily influences the system
- Curvy or red lines mean that the system is a stressful relationship
- Thicker (darker) lines mean stronger relationship

== Other uses ==
In the context of ecology, ecogram can also refer to a kind of Venn diagram used to depict the niches a plant may live in, depending on the environmental conditions, especially used in forestry. See e.g. de:Ökogramm.

== See also ==
- Culturagram
- Family Therapy
- Power mapping
- Systems Theory
