= Thomas Bermingham (priest) =

American Jesuit priest and scholar

The Reverend Thomas Bermingham SJ
- Bermingham as he appeared in the film The Exorcist in 1973
- Born: Thomas Valentine Bermingham; 1918; New Rochelle, New York, U.S.
- Died: 21 November 1998 (aged 80); New York City, U.S.
- Known for: The Exorcist
- Awards: Fulbright scholarship

Academic work
- Discipline: Classical scholar & teacher
- Institutions: Georgetown University; Fordham University
- Notable students: Joe Paterno; William Peter Blatty

Thomas Valentine Bermingham, SJ (1918 – 21 November 1998) was an American Jesuit priest, and Classical teacher and scholar. In addition to his academic career at institutions including Fordham University and Georgetown University, he was known for his involvement in the production of the 1973 horror film The Exorcist, on which he worked as a technical advisor as well as acting in a minor role.

== Biography ==
=== Early life and education ===
Bermingham was born in New Rochelle, New York to Thomas Valentine "Val" and Katherine "Kitty" Bermingham. He was one of nine siblings, including Edith, Mary, Betty, Helen, Margaret L., Suzanne, Robert A., and John H. His family was of Irish descent, and growing up he attended Regis High School, a Jesuit institution in New York City.

=== Academic career ===
From 1943 to 1947, while he was a Jesuit scholastic, he taught Latin at the now-closed Brooklyn Preparatory School in New York. Notably, he taught future Penn State football coach Joe Paterno, and acted as a mentor to him. He reminisced later that "the Father gave me the sense that I was being handed a treasure. Joe is a treasure." Paterno later recalled:

"At the beginning of my senior year, this austere big brother of a priest-to-be led me to Virgil. Father Bermingham told me that Virgil was the greatest of the Roman poets, that he lived just three or four decades before Christ, and that he is known mostly for his epic poem, the Aeneid. Father Bermingham asked if I'd like to read it with him. I did. 'What I had in mind,' he said, 'was reading it together in the original Latin.' 'In Latin? A poem as long as a book?' 'Yes.' The book was on his desk, more than four hundred pages thick.

Paterno convinced Bermingham to "broker a deal" with his basketball coach in order to work on this project, allowing Paterno to come to school early to shoot free throws so he would be excused from practice half an hour early, when he and Bermingham read and translated the Aeneid. At Brooklyn Prep, he also taught William Peter Blatty, who graduated the year after Paterno.

Following his stint at Brooklyn Prep, Bermingham went on to work at Georgetown University in Washington, D.C. While teaching at Georgetown, Bermingham once again taught William Peter Blatty. It was in this setting that the seeds of what would become the famous horror movie The Exorcist were planted. Bermingham suggested that Blatty use the topic of demonic possession for an oratorical project. The case of Roland Doe piqued his interest and Blatty never forgot it, eventually making a novel and movie based on that story.

However, by at least as early as 1953 and until its closure in 1969, he was a professor, dean of faculty, and later master of studies at St. Andrew-on-Hudson Novitiate in Poughkeepsie, New York. As master of studies, he was in charge of the curriculum and studies of the roughly 70 Jesuit novices who were studying at St. Andrew in any given year. During these years, Bermingham also took several scholarly trips to Europe to study the classics. From August 2–10, 1953, funded by a Fulbright scholarship, he traveled to Cumae with a summer study tour led by the Rev. Raymond V. Schoder of West Baden College, conducted by the Vergilian Society of America. Four years later, in the summer of 1957, he participated in a ten-day session in the Naples area, also led by Fr. Shoder, and affiliated with the Vergilian Society of Cumae.

Bermingham spent the 1961–62 academic year studying at the American School of Classical Studies at Athens. During the spring months beginning in March, he worked on a dissertation, "a critical edition of John Chrysostom's earliest opusculum."

During the mid- to late-1960s and early 1970s, Bermingham served as Vice Provincial for Formation of the New York Province of the Society of Jesus. Following the closure of St. Andrew-on-Hudson in 1969, Bermingham went on to teach as a professor in the Classics Department of Fordham University, and LeMoyne College.

=== The Exorcist and other films ===
The Exorcist is a 1971 supernatural horror novel by William Peter Blatty, based on the true story of Roland Doe, a 1949 case in which Catholic priests performed a series of exorcisms on a 14-year-old boy in Maryland.

Bermingham taught Blatty Latin at Brooklyn Prep in the mid-1940s, and worked at Georgetown at the same time Blatty was attending. Blatty first heard about the Roland Doe case from his religion professor at Georgetown, a priest named Father Gallagher. Bermingham then recommended Blatty read the best-known source of information about the case, an article by Bill Brinkley that appeared in The Washington Post on 2 August 1949, and suggested that Blatty use the story as his topic for an oratorical assignment.

Blatty never forgot about the Roland Doe story, and in 1969 he outlined a novel in which a young boy commits a murder, and the boy's mother uses "possession" as a legal defense, enlisting a priest to help substantiate the claim. That year, Blatty sought Bermingham out for advice on the novel, at which time Bermingham was master of studies at St. Andrew-on-Hudson Novitiate. When the novel The Exorcist was published in 1971, Blatty included Bermingham in the credits, writing:

"I would also like to thank the Rev. Thomas V. Bermingham, S. J., Vice-Provincial for Formation of the New York Province of the Society of Jesus, for suggesting the subject matter of this novel."

Work began on a film version of The Exorcist the same year that the novel was published. Blatty, the film's producer, approached Bermingham to work on the film. He was initially reluctant to participate, worrying that the film would be "another Rosemary's Baby" but he ended up signing on. Bermingham, along with Fathers John Nicola and William O'Malley, all Jesuits, served as technical advisors. In addition, Bermingham and O'Malley had minor acting roles in the film, with Bermingham portraying "Tom", the President of Georgetown University, and O'Malley playing Father Dyer.

During the course of the filming, a large number of mysterious accidents and odd events were taking place on the set, and the cast and crew were increasingly nervous. Eventually, the director, William Friedkin, approached Bermingham and asked him to exorcise the set, which held the construction of the Georgetown townhouse and was located in a warehouse. Bermingham said no, telling Friedkin there was not enough evidence of demonic activity and that an exorcism would only increase anxiety. The next day, the set burned to the ground. Bermingham then gave a solemn blessing and said a few words of reassurance in an event attended by the entire cast and crew, from Friedkin to Max von Sydow, who played Father Merrin.

The Exorcist became a smash hit after its release in December 1973, and in the weeks that followed, many viewers wound up fainting, vomiting, or running out of theaters screaming. The property damage and workload for movie theater janitors caused by the pandemonium became so substantial that Warner Bros. actually requested that Bermingham attend an opening to offer spiritual counsel to people who were unable to cope with the film's content. At a news conference in Milan, Italy, where Bermingham and director Friedkin answered questions about The Exorcist, the large audience refused to leave the auditorium, forcing officials to shut off the power in order to make them leave. Bermingham received much personal attention as well following the film's release. He noted later:

“When the movie came out, I found myself on the hot seat. People saw my face and my name on the screen, and they assumed I was the answer to their problems. For quite a while dozens of people were trying to contact me every week. And they weren't all Catholics. Some were Jewish, some Protestant, some agnostic, and they all believed that they themselves or someone close to them might be demonically possessed. They were truly desperate people.”

In the years after the Exorcist, Bermingham was consulted to work as an advisor on several other film projects. He served as a religious consultant for the 1979 film The Amityville Horror and also for the 1982 film Amityville II: The Possession. He also appeared in the 1998 television documentary The Fear of God: 25 Years of 'The Exorcist' as himself.

=== Death and legacy ===
Bermingham died on 21 November 1998 at his residence on the Fordham University campus in The Bronx, at the age of 80. His body was reposed at the Loyola Hall Chapel at Fordham, with visitation in the three days preceding the funeral. A funeral mass was later celebrated at Fordham University Church.

The Reverend Thomas Bermingham, S.J. Scholarship in the Classics at Pennsylvania State University was created in 1998 with a $3.5 million donation that accounted for the creation of the scholarship as well as for other uses. The scholarship is awarded on a competitive basis and provides financial assistance to full-time undergraduate students enrolled or planning to enroll in Greek or Latin studies in Penn State's College of the Liberal Arts.

The Rev. Thomas Bermingham, SJ, Scholarship at Fordham University is a renewable scholarship awarded to an undergraduate student with financial need. The GPA requirement is 3.0, and preference is given to minority students.

== Filmography ==
Year	Film	Role
1973	The Exorcist	Tom (President of Georgetown University) Technical advisor
1979	The Amityville Horror	Religious consultant
1982	Amityville II: The Possession	Religious consultant
1998	The Fear of God: 25 Years of 'The Exorcist'	Himself

== See also ==
- List of Jesuits
- List of Georgetown University faculty
- List of Fordham University faculty
