= Power mapping =

Power mapping is a visual tool used by social advocates to identify the best individuals to target to promote social change. The role of relationships and networks is very important when advocates seek change in a social justice issue. The power mapping process entails the use of a visual tool to conceptualize the sphere of a person or group's influence. The power map tool helps to visualize whom you need to influence, who can influence your target and what can be done to influence the identified person with power. Power Mapping is often politically focused and is frequently used to persuade decision makers to alter how they may vote on an issue. It can also be used to convince an organization to take a stand, persuade a foundation to give your organization a grant, or compel a newspaper to write a favorable editorial.

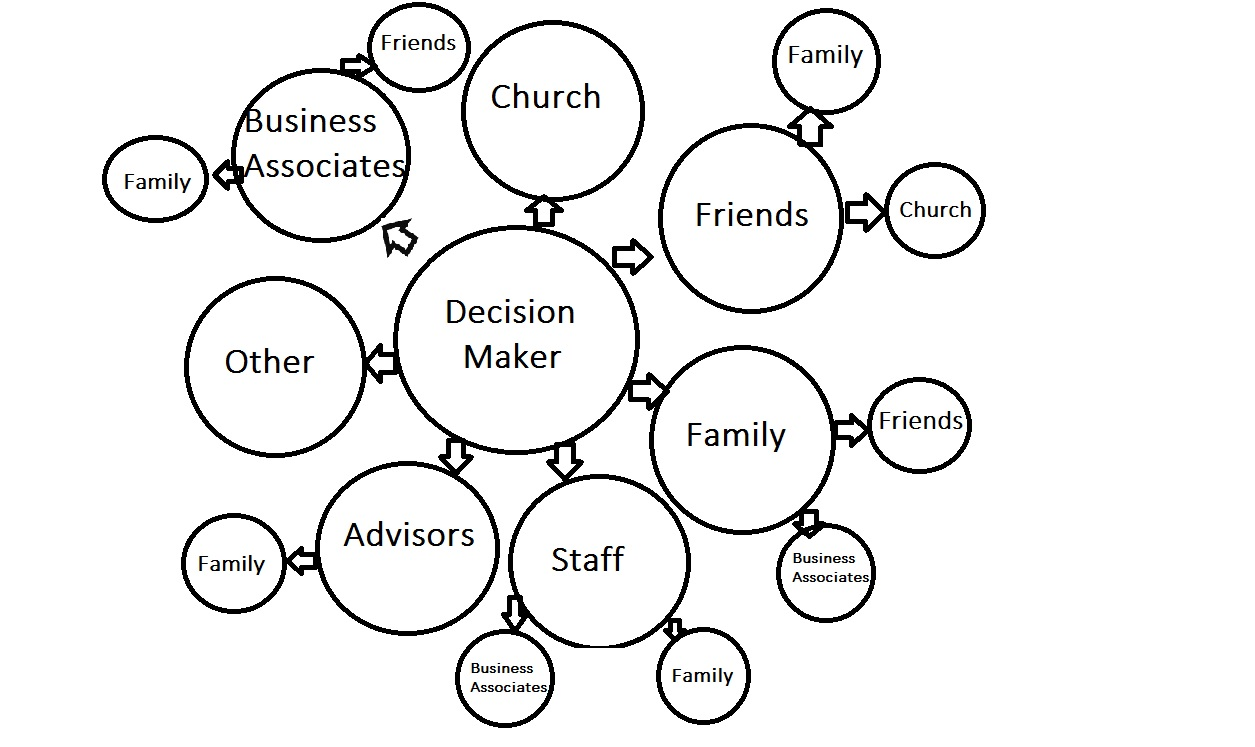
Powermap Example

== Steps to power mapping ==
=== Before power mapping ===
Identify and familiarize oneself with target social problem and major players or decision makers involved.

==== Step 1: Determine target ====
Power mapping is a visual tool that should be drawn out. In the center is the person or institution that can make the decision or enact desired changes to address the identified social problem.

==== Step 2: Map influence to target ====
Next, it is important to think about associations, people or institutions that have relationships with the target individual and can potentially influence them. These could include work, political, family, religious and neighborhood ties and they should be written in a ring around the problem. Creativity is important when identifying potential associations (barber/hairdresser etc.). Also, strategy is an important part of the process. Be sure to look at all major donors and constituency groups the person has interacted with. Finally, be thorough in the way you think about relationships. Spend time looking at each identified associate and think about the people and institutions they are connected to.

==== Step 3: Determine relational power lines ====
Begin to review the network that you have created and determine any connections between the target, as well as the different people and institutions. Remember to take indirect connections into account as well for example, a decision maker may not be directly involved with an organization, but may have family members that are.

==== Step 4: Target priority relationships ====
Circle the people with the most power relational lines drawn to them and identify people with few critical relational power lines that has a lot of influence. If there is someone without a clear relationship then develop a plan to find out more about the person.

==== Step 5: Make a plan ====
Create action steps for moving forward by determining the best way to access the individuals through the relationships determined.

This is one of many methods of power mapping. The Change Agency, Beautiful Trouble, Oxfam, and others have developed others.

== Power mapping in clinical practice ==
Power mapping can be helpful for the clinician and the client or group to see environmental factors contributing to their identified issue(s) as well as the potential strengths that can contribute to client well-being. Power mapping has been used in the clinical setting in order to enhance the life of the client and to measure the potential power of an individual. In this setting, the power map is used as a visual tool showing the potential assets and resources and can include proximal influences such as: home and family life, education, social life, personal resources, job situation/skills, and material resources.

This tool can look similar to an ecomap, but can go further in depth to account for the more distal influences such as: policy, economics, culture, and the media. Power mapping can be beneficial when used as a visual to determine the clients strengths as well as the areas that cause the client the most distress and how the larger system may be a major factor in an individuals issue. Power mapping can allow clients to be enlightened on the systemic or institutional powers that contribute to the damaging environment in which they may live. This allows the client to attach personal challenges to the larger system and can bring with it a “significant relief of distress” Power mapping “is likely in clinical use to vary from individual to individual” According to Hagan & Smail, maps can be used to:

1. Guide the helper and client to map current circumstances.
2. Provide a visual summary of clients' current/past position.
3. Target areas for concert ed action to increase power.
4. Monitor progress.
5. Measure outcomes in mental health interventions.
6. Compare client groups.

== See also ==
- Power (social and political)
- Collective action
