= Joseph A. Mulry =

American academic administrator

Father Joseph A. Mulry S.J.
- Born: February 8, 1874; New York, USA
- Died: August 31, 1921 (aged 47)
- Occupations: University President, Jesuit Priest

The Reverend Joseph A. Mulry, S.J., was President of Fordham University from 1915 until 1919. Fordham University is a Jesuit institution with campuses in the Bronx, Manhattan, and West Harrison. Born in New York in 1874, Mulry was 41 years old when he was appointed President of Fordham.

Fr. Mulry was appointed President of Fordham University in 1915, replacing Thomas J. McCluskey in the role. Shortly before Mulry's appointment, Fordham University had been offered the opportunity to begin a school of social service, but had turned down the offer, and the school had instead been adopted by Manhattan College. One of Mulry's first acts as President was to urge Manhattan College to cancel the arrangement and allow Fordham University to establish the preeminent Catholic school of social service. The college agreed, and the Fordham Graduate School of Social Service was founded in the fall of 1916. Enrollment during the first year of classes was over 200.

The formation of the School of Social Service led to further changes at the university, including the Graduate School of Arts and Sciences, and the Graduate School of Education. Housed in the Woolworth building, these schools originally offered only a handful of courses, but within Mulry's time as President, the graduate schools would grow exponentially. This time period also saw the first journalism course offered at the university, and the beginnings of the Fordham Ram, the university's weekly newspaper.

The United States joined World War I in 1917, and in response, Mulry formed the Fordham Ambulance Corps, an organization that assisted the army in transporting sick and wounded soldiers. The Corps included 127 men, led by Captain Joseph E. Donnelly, a professor from Fordham's medical school. This was only the beginning of Mulry's response to the war; in 1918, Fordham University formed one of the first Student Army Training Corps, after the passing of legislation allowing the formation of these programs by the U.S. Congress. In May 1918, Fr. Mulry conducted Mass at Camp Dix for 15,000 soldiers. Mulry frequently expressed his support of the war efforts and strongly encouraged any students capable of serving in the armed forces to do so, a position that was intended to demonstrate the patriotism of Catholics. Mulry himself requested permission to serve as a chaplain in the war, but was unable to do so. In 1919, Mulry was compelled to retire from the role of President due to his ailing health, and in 1921, he died of his illness.

Academic offices
Preceded by Thomas J. McCluskey	President of Fordham University; 1915–1919	Succeeded by Edward P. Tivnan
Preceded by James F. McDermott	8th President of Saint Peter's College; 1911–1915	Succeeded by Edward J. McGrath
