= Culturagram =

Family assessment tool in social work

A culturagram is a family assessment tool used in the practice of social work which was first introduced by Fordham University professor, Dr. Elaine Congress.

== Rationale ==
In social work and other fields, cultural competence is an important skill. As the number and diversity of immigrants has increased dramatically in the United States (Camarota, 2007) there is increased need for clinicians to understand the cultural backgrounds of their clients. A culturagram is a family assessment tool that provides a graphical representation of various aspects of an individual and family's culture.

It can be helpful in assessment and intervention planning for culturally diverse families. This tool grew out of the recognition that families are becoming increasingly culturally diverse and social workers must be able to understand cultural differences between and within families. When attempting to understand culturally diverse families, families needed to be understood within a cultural context. Assessing a family only in terms of a specific cultural identity, however, may lead to overgeneralization and stereotyping (Congress & Kung, 2013). A Puerto Rican family in which all members are American citizens and have lived in the United States for 20 years is very different from an undocumented Mexican family that emigrated last month. Yet both families are considered Hispanic/Latino. Even within the same family group, each member has had a different immigration and acculturation experience, as often family members immigrate at different times and some members may be U.S. citizens, while others are undocumented. Furthermore, family members who regularly work or attend school in the larger community may be more acculturated than those who stay at home.

While the eco-map (Hartman, 1995) and genogram (McGoldrick, Gerson, & Perry, 2008) are useful tools in assessing the family, neither emphasize the important role of culture in understanding the family. The culturagram was developed to help in understanding the cultural background of culture in families (Congress, 1994, 1997; Congress & Kung, 2013). This tool has been applied to work with people of color (Lum, 2004), battered women (Congress & Brownell, 2007), children (Congress, 2001), older people (Brownell & Fenley, 2009), families in crisis (Congress, 2000), Mexican families (Congress, 2004a), Latino and Asian families (Congress & Kung, 2005), immigrant families with health problems (Congress, 2004b; Congress, 2013) and in family development theory (Congress, 2008).

== Creation of the culturagram ==
The culturagram represents an attempt to individualize culturally diverse families (Congress & Kung, 2013). Completing a culturagram on a family can help a clinician develop a better understanding of the family. First developed in 1994 and then revised in 2000 and again in 2009, the culturagram examines the following areas:

- contact with cultural and religious institutions, holidays, food, and clothing
- health beliefs and access to health care
- impact of trauma and crisis events
- language spoken at home and in the community
- legal status
- oppression, discrimination, bias, and racism
- reasons for relocation
- time in community
- values about education and work
- values about family—structure, power, myths, and rules. Camarota, S. (2007)

The culturagram has been seen as an essential tool in helping social workers work more effectively with families from many different cultures. Not only does it help the social worker achieve greater understanding of the culture of a family, it can also point the way toward future treatment. The culturagram can be useful in arriving at decisions about treatment planning and intervention. While using the culturagram the practitioner is required to look at the family in the here and now. Sometimes it is helpful, however, to construct the culturagram at different points of time, first at the beginning of intervention and then at a future point. In constructing the culturagram a retrospective approach is also useful. To truly understand immigrant families learning about an immigrant's history is important. For example, the social worker can study what was the immigrants’ experience in their country of origin and in transit. Often a developmental approach that looks at three stages of immigration (pre-migration, transit, and current situation) is helpful in working with immigrants. (Drachman, 2004). For example, refugees may have had particularly traumatic experiences in their country of origin and undocumented immigrants through the transit period that may affect their current psychological well being in the United States.

Current practice looks to evidence that specific interventions are effective. Students and practitioners have used the culturagram in their professional practice with families and reported that it is helpful in engaging families in a nonthreatening way. In the use of the culturagram culture is viewed through a multidimensional lens, rather than as a monolithic entity. Initial evaluation of the culturagram has been positive, and there are further plans to assess further its effectiveness in promoting culturally competent practice.

With the increased number of immigrants in the United States, there will be greater demand for culturally competent practice with immigrant clients and families. Social workers will need to study what methods and models are the most effective. The culturagram emerges as a useful method to better understand and plan interventions with immigrant families

== Print/archival References ==
- Brownell, P. (1997). The application of the culturagram in cross-cultural practice with elder abuse victims. Journal of Elder Abuse and Neglect, 9(2), 19–33.
- Brownell, P. and Fenley. R. (2009). Older adult immigrants in the United States: Issues and Services. In F. Chang-Muy & E, Congress, E. Social work with immigrants and refugees: Legal issues, clinical skills, and advocacy. (pp. 277–307) New York: Springer Publishing Company.
- Camarota, S. (2007). Immigrants in the United States, 2007: A profile of America’s foreign-born population. Backgrounder 1– 43. Washington, DC: Center for Migration Studies.
- Chang-Muy, F, (2009). Legal classification of immigrants. In Chang-Muy, F., & Congress, E. Social work with immigrants and refugees: Legal issues, clinical skills, and advocacy. (pp. 39–62) New York: Springer Publishing Company.
- Chang-Muy, F., & Congress, E. (2009). Social work with immigrants and refugees: Legal issues, clinical skills, and advocacy. New York: Springer Publishing Company.
- Congress, E (2004a). Crisis intervention and diversity: Emphasis on a Mexican immigrant family’s acculturation conflicts. In P. Meyer (Ed.), Paradigms of clinical social work, vol. 3, Emphasis on diversity (pp 125–144). New York: Brunner-Routledge.
- Congress, E. (1994). The use of culturagrams to assess and empower culturally diverse families. Families in Society, 75, 531–540.
- Congress, E. (1996). Family crisis: Life cycle and bolts from the blue: Assessment and treatment. In A. Roberts (Ed.), Crisis Intervention and brief treatment: Theory, techniques, and applications (pp. 142–159). Chicago: Nelson-Hall.
- Congress, E. (1997) Using the culturagram to assess and empower culturally diverse families. In E. Congress, Multicultural perspectives in working with families (pp. 3–16). New York: Springer Publishing Company.
- Congress, E. (2000). Crisis intervention with culturally diverse families. In A. Roberts, Crisis intervention handbook, 2nd ed. (pp. 431–449). New York: Oxford University Press.
- Congress, E. (2001). Ethical issues in work with culturally diverse children and their families. In N.B. Webb, Culturally diverse parent-child and family relationships. (pp. 29–53). New York: Columbia University Press.
- Congress, E. (2004b). Cultural and ethical issues in working with culturally diverse patients and their families: The use of the culturagram to promote cultural competent practice in health care settings. Social Work in Health Care, 39(3/4), 249–262.
- Congress, E. (2008). Individual and family development theory. In P. Lehman and N. Coady (Eds.), Theoretical perspectives for direct social work practice: A generalist-eclectic approach, 2nd ed. (pp. 83–104). New York: Springer Publishing Company.
- Congress, E. (2012). Social work with refugees. In D. Elliott and U. Segal, editors). Refugees worldwide. Volume 4 Law, Policy, and Programs (pp. 197–218). Santa Barbara, CA: Praeger.
- Congress, E. (2013). Immigrants and health care. In Social Work Section of the American Public Health Association, Handbook for Public Health Social Work (pp. 103–121). New York: Springer Publishing Company.
- Congress, E., & Brownell, P. (2007). Application of the culturagram with culturally and ethnically diverse battered women. In A. Roberts (Ed.), Battered women and their families. New York: Springer.
- Congress, E., & Kung, W. (2013). Using the culturagram to assess and empower culturally diverse families. In E. Congress and M. Gonzalez, Multicultural perspectives in working with families (pp. 2–21). New York: Springer Publishing Company.
- Congress, E., & Lyons, B. (1992). Ethnic differences in health beliefs: Implications for social workers in health care settings. Social Work in Health Care, 17(3), 81–96.
- Devore, W., & Schlesinger, E. (1999). Ethnic-sensitive social work practice. Boston: Allyn & Bacon.
- Drachman, D.and Pine, B (2004). Effective child welfare practice with immigrant and refugee children and their families. Washington: Child Welfare League of America.
- Hartman, A. (1995). Diagrammatic assessment of family relationships. Families in Society, 76, 111-122.
- Lum, D. (2004). Social work practice and people of color: A process-stage approach, 5th ed. Pacific Grove, CA: Brooks Cole.
- McGoldrick, M, Gerson, R, &Perry S. (2008) Genograms: Assessment and intervention. 3rd ed. New York: Norton.
- U.S. Bureau of Census. (2007). Current population survey, 113th ed. Austin, TX: Reference Press.
