= Abigail M. Harris =

American psychologist

- Education: Michigan State University; University of California, Berkeley
- Occupation: Psychologist

Abigail M. Harris, is an associate professor at Fordham University's, Graduate School of Education. Her research has focused on educational issues in Africa and Latin America.

== Education ==
Harris received her Master's in Learning and Cognition at Michigan State University, and her Ph.D. in both Educational and School Psychology at the University of California, Berkeley.

== Research ==
Harris conducts research on school-based consultation and systemic educational reform. She is fluent in both English and Spanish and her work has been published in multiple countries and languages.

Harris has researched improving and assessing educational problems in several countries in Africa and Latin America. Her primary areas of research include school-based consultation and systemic educational reform. Her research in school-based consultation is targeted to school psychologists learning necessary skills and apply them through collaboration with teachers and administrators. The skills acquired by the school psychologist and the collaboration with teachers and administrators ensure that the needs of the student are met.

Harris's other area of research examined systemic educational reform in developing countries. She has worked on systemic educational reform in Honduras, El Salvador and Egypt. Primarily Harris's work in various nations has been to implement educational reform that helped the countries to conduct reform and further examine policies where the reform can be tenable. She has taken students along with her to different countries to further develop sustainable educational reform in schools. Her students have traveled to Ghana, El Salvador, and Honduras. Harris's multicultural approach to the field of School Psychology has helped bring it to the international level. Her other areas of research include, Self-Worth and School Learning, and Systemic Reform in International Contexts.

== Selected publications ==
Harris has taken the skills from school psychology and used it as a guide to assist in educational reform. Some of her most notable publications have included:

- "Beneath education production functions: The case of primary education in Jamaica," (Peabody Journal of Education, 2005)
- "Cross-sex collaborative learning in elementary classrooms" (American Educational Research Journal, 1984),
- "Impact of New Horizons for Primary Schools on literacy and numeracy in Jamaica, 1999-2004," (Academy for Educational Development, 2005)
- "Sex and social influence: Does sex function as a status characteristic in mixed-sex groups of children?" (Journal of Educational Psychology, 1983)

== Teaching and administrative roles ==
Harris teaches several graduate-level courses at Fordham University including, Consultation with Families, Consultation Practicum in Bilingual School Psychology, Consultation Practicum in School Psychology, Instructional Consultation, Issues in Non-biased Assessment, Fundamentals of Educational and Psychological Measurement, and Theories of School-based Consultation.

She has also been involved in the administration of Fordham's School Psychology program, and is a director of the school psychology program at Fordham University.

== Fellowships ==
Harris was named a fellow of the American Psychological Association (International) in 2012.
