= Abraham Abramovsky =

American jurist and attorney

- Born: February 1, 1946; Israel
- Died: July 23, 2007 (aged 61); Riverdale, Bronx, New York, U.S.
- Education: Queens College; University at Buffalo Law School; Columbia Law School
- Occupations: Attorney, law professor
- Children: 3 sons, 1 daughter

Abraham Abramovsky (1946–2007) was an Israeli-born American jurist and attorney. Born in Israel, he was educated in New York state and became a Professor of Law at Fordham University. He was an expert on Jewish Law and organized crime in the United States and Israel. He published research about the illicit global trade of MDMA, also known as Ecstasy.

== Early life ==
Abraham Abramovsky was born in 1946 in Israel.

Abramovsky graduated from Queens College, where he earned a B.A. He earned a J.D. from the University at Buffalo Law School, followed by an LL.M. and a Ph.D. in law from the Columbia Law School. His thesis was entitled Multilateral conventions for the suppression of unlawful seizure and interference with aircraft.

== Career ==
Abramovsky became Professor of Law at Fordham University in 1979, where he served as the director of the International Criminal Law Center. He was an expert on Jewish Law. He was also an expert on organized crime in the United States and Israel. In his research, Abramovsky argued that the illicit global trade of MDMA, also known as Ecstasy, was controlled by the Israeli mafia, who used Jewish Russian immigrants as couriers. He added that the couriers collected the drug from the Netherlands or Belgium before selling it in other countries.

Abramovsky appeared on Charlie Rose to talk about organized crime in 2002.

== Personal life and death ==
Abramovsky had three sons, Dov, Abba and Ari, and a daughter, Aviva. He resided in Riverdale, where he died on July 23, 2007.

== Works ==
- Abramovsky, Abraham (1981). Criminal Law and the Corporate Counsel. New York: Harcourt Brace Jovanovich. ISBN 9780150039839. OCLC 6087109.
