= William Moylan =

9th President of Fordham University

William Moylan, S.J.
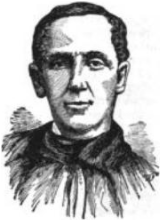
- Born: June 22, 1822; Ireland
- Died: January 14, 1891 (aged 68); New York, New York
- Burial place: Fordham University Cemetery

William Moylan was born in Ireland on June 22, 1822. He emigrated to the United States early in his life, and before joining the Society of Jesuits was committed to volunteer work. Moylan, as a secular priest, worked with the Native Americans and fishermen on the Gaspé Peninsula. When he was 29, on November 14, 1851 he joined the Society of Jesuits. After joining the Society, he was assigned to teach a course at Fordham University. After several other positions, including at St. Francis Xavier's, Moylan became the ninth president of Fordham in 1865.

== St. John's College/Fordham University ==
Moylan made several additions to the college that helped advance it into the late-nineteenth-century world. "Some examples of these changes include napkins on the tables (1867), hot buns for the boarder in the afternoon (1868)." Alongside these changes, Moylan also decided to continue the goal of his predecessor, Edward Doucet; he wanted to expand Fordham's campus through the addition of a new building. He wrote a letter to the Department of Education in Albany describing the advantages of the new building for the taxpayers, began a novena, and raised the tuition. While the tuition increase did provide Moylan with some of the funds he desired, Albany rejected his proposal. He modified his goal, and decided to start with the building of a new wing.

== Legacy ==
The new wing, Seniors' Hall, was finished in 1867. It was "a five-story building located to the east of the Administration Building for the college students that eventually contained dormitories, classrooms, study halls, reading rooms, a billiard room, and a gym complete with battling-net for baseball practice during the winter." While Moylan's dream for the college was not completed, the Seniors' Hall forms a part of the large Dealy building currently a part of the Rose Hill campus.

Moylan died at the university on January 14, 1891, and was buried at its cemetery.
