= Betsy McCoach =

American psychologist and academic

D. Betsy McCoach is an American psychologist who has served as the Anne Anastasi Chair of Psychometrics and Quantitative Psychology and Professor of Psychology at Fordham University in New York since 2025. She previously served as Professor of Educational Psychology at University of Connecticut.

== Biography ==
McCoach received a B.A. in economics and French from University of Delaware, an M.A. in secondary education from Lehigh University, and an M.A. and Ph.D. in educational psychology from University of Connecticut. She is a Fellow of the American Psychological Association. McCoach was awarded a Distinguished Scholar Award from the National Association of Gifted Children in 2023.
