= William Gockeln =

American priest (1820–1886)

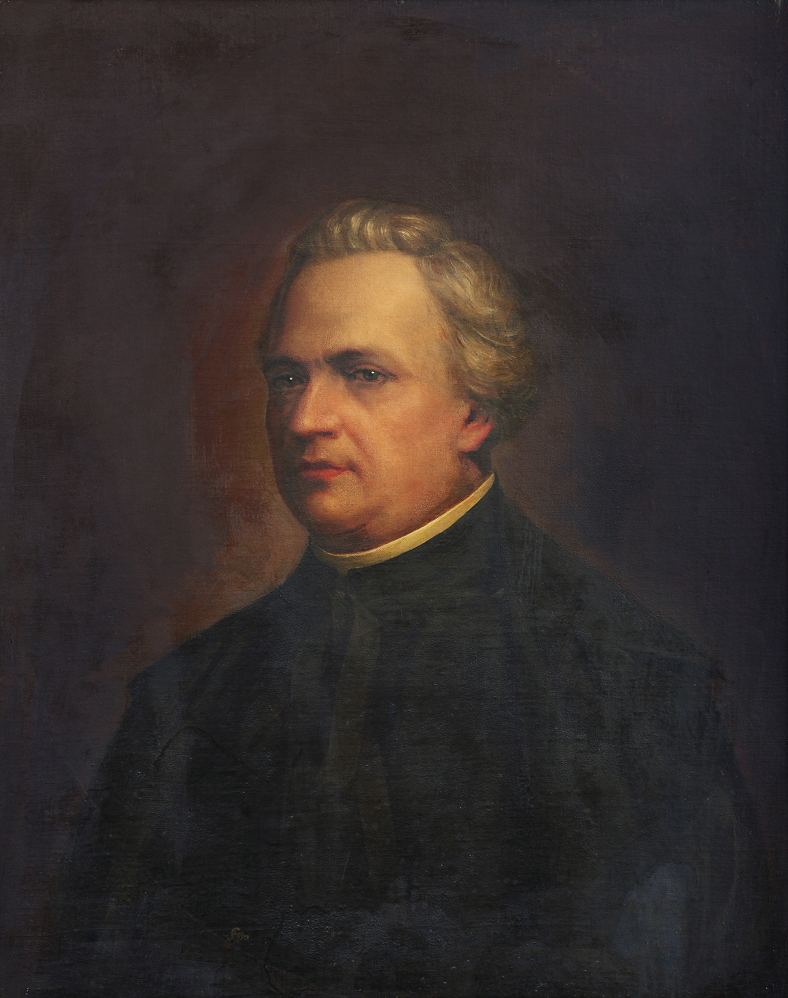
- Born: November 8, 1820; Grosseneder, Germany
- Died: November 26, 1886 (aged 66); Providence, Rhode Island and Providence Plantations

William Gockeln was a Jesuit priest and tenth president of St. John's College (now Fordham University) from 1868 to 1874.

== Early life ==
Gockeln was born on November 8, 1820, in Grossender, near Paderborn, Germany. He was baptized on the same day he was born at the Church of Saints Peter and Paul in Grossender. During his baptism, he received the name Frederick Wilhelm. At the age of thirteen he and his older brother left Germany and traveled to New York. He remained in New York for a few years, but decided to move to Canada and later enrolled at the Collège de Montréal. While studying there, he became a student of his Sulpician teacher John Larkin. Larkin decided that he wanted to become a Jesuit, and when he went to St. Mary's, Kentucky, Gockeln accompanied him. Gockeln went to the college first as a student, and then decided to follow the example of Larkin by becoming a fellow Jesuit novice.

== St. John's College ==
Gockeln began his philosophical studies at St. John's college, now Fordham University, but decided to finish those studies in Belgium. Afterwards, he completed his theological studies at Laval, France and was ordained there in 1852. He then returned to North America in 1853 and "began a series of teaching and administrative positions at St. Mary's (Montreal), Fordham, Xavier College, NYC, and later at St. Lawrence's, NYC." During this time he was also the first Fr. Minister in Woodstock, Maryland at the new Jesuit scholasticate, and had seven years of missionary life in Guelph and Chatham, Canada.

In 1874, he became the President of St. John's College, and maintained that position until 1882. In the first few months of his presidency, he needed to decide how to move the college forward; did he continue the work of Joseph Shea, or reverse the disciplinary changes he brought to the college? Ultimately, Gockeln decided to implement a stricter regime, and "the reputation of the institution was restored,"

During his eight years of presidency, there was one significant issue that arose; the school colors. At the time, Fordham and their rival school, Harvard University, both had magenta school colors. In 1874 a meeting was held to discussing changing the color of the school as a way of distinguishing themselves. Stephen Wall, a member of the class of 1875, suggested maroon and everyone agreed on the choice.

Gockeln also made the decision to permit James Walsh to attend St. John's despite his parents being unable to afford the entire cost. His parents lived comfortably, but unlike their neighbors, they could not afford to send their sons to a Jesuit boarding school. Gockeln wrote to his parents, and allowed them to pay $300 a year towards tuition; a deal that exempted James from several school fees. Gockeln's hope was that James' father would help recruit students to St. John's from the Wilkes-Barre area. James was a dedicated student, and went on to found Fordham University Press and be a founding dean for the Fordham College of Medicine.

== Later years ==
In 1882, Gockeln stepped down from his position as president, and from 1883-1884 he served as a dean at the College of the Holy Cross in Worcester, Massachusetts. During the following year, 1884-1885, he was at St. Peter's, Jersey City, doing parish work. He then spent the remaining months of his life acting as Superior at the Jesuit Residence, St. Joseph's, in Providence, Rhode Island.

== Personal life ==
In November 26, 1886, Gockeln died from pneumonia in Providence, Rhode Island.
