= Thomas More College (New York City) =

American liberal arts college (1964–1974)

Thomas More College was a coeducational, undergraduate college of liberal arts and sciences that was open from the fall of 1964 until it merged with Fordham College at Rose Hill in 1974. It offered arts and science programs for women as well as programs, such as drama, for men that were unavailable at Fordham University, which, at that time, only admitted men into its undergraduate programs. While the undergraduate school of Fordham University only admitted men, many of Fordham's graduate schools, such as the School of Education, Graduate School of Arts and Sciences, Law School, College of Pharmacy and School of Social Service were coeducational. Thomas More College, however, provided women the opportunity to earn an undergraduate liberal arts degree.

== History (1964 and beyond) ==
In 1963, Thomas More College was expected to take in 400 students in its first year with the goal of eventually increasing enrollment to 2,200 students.

The report of the Middle States Association in 1950 stated: "It would be undesirable to propose that women be admitted to Fordham College because of its long tradition." So, instead of making Fordham co-educational, the University decided instead to establish a women's college with a unique name and name "right on the campus where the little bluestockings could sit beside the boys in class without making Fordham College co-educational."

At Rose Hill, the all-female school began instruction in 1964.

Rev. John W. Donohue was the first dean of Thomas More College until 1966. Then, he returned to the School of Education as an associate professor and Dr. Patricia R. Plante became the first woman dean.

Sir John Rothenstein, who had directed London's Tate Gallery for 27 years, was a visiting Art Professor at the fine-arts department of Thomas More College in 1967.

Dean Barbara Wells was both dean and associate professor of government at Fordham's Thomas More College since 1968. In 1971, she became the deal of faculty at Vassar College.

The curriculum at Thomas More College included a semester on "The Contemporary American" which was an interdisciplinary take on the subject through literature, art, philosophy and theology. From 1964-1965, the curriculum emphasized classical and modern liberal arts as opposed to professional subjects. Also, unlike other primarily women's schools, such as New Rochelle or Barnard, Thomas More did not include more courses and disciplines traditionally associated with women's subjects.

In 1967, about 150 women from the Thomas More College petitioned to add a class on birth control to the curriculum. This petition requested three things: "That a general education program in birth control include lectures on moral, medical and sociological aspects; that theologians, physicians, sociologists and psychologists serve as lecturers; and that a qualified physician be available in the university infirmary or counseling service to answer any questions they may have on the subject." In response, Dr. Meade, the Vice President and Dean of Students, recommended symposiums about marriage that "dealt with the biological, social, psychological and philosophical aspects of marriage. They explained the permanent relation between mature man and mature woman."

== Merge with Fordham University ==
In 1969, the board of trustees was reorganized to include a majority of nonclerical members, which officially made the university an independent institution. The College of Pharmacy closed due to declining enrollment in 1972. Fordham College at Rose Hill merged with Thomas More College in 1974, becoming coeducational.
