= Multicultural counseling =

Multicultural counseling is a type of counseling where the therapist addresses the struggles of a client whose race, gender, socioeconomic background, religion, or any other part of their identity doesn't fit in with the majority. In multicultural therapy sessions, the sociocultural environment of the client, as well as issues of power and privilege, are given attention. This is a strengths-based approach; counselors focus on positive change in both the process and the outcome.

== History ==
The 1950s is known to be the beginning of the multicultural counseling movement. During this time, this type of counseling was primarily used help assimilate minorities into the majority, but by the 1960s, counselors were told to not impose their beliefs onto their clients. When the Civil Rights Act was enacted, that helped bring light to the idea that cultural difference should be appreciated, and not assimilated into the majority.

In the 1970s, a language shift occurred and the counseling was called 'multicultural' or 'cross-cultural' instead of minority counseling. The 1980s and 1990s saw a lot of new studies and research on the importance of multicultural counseling and there was a new call to action for the field to be more aware of cultural issues that minorities face.

== Why people saw a need for multicultural counseling ==
- Research has failed to create a realistic understanding of ethnic groups.
- Western based social sciences want to be objective, but their findings and interests are linked to a personal and societal value system.
- Being a minority can be an impediment to counseling.
- The belief in ‘rugged individualism’ and the implications that the person is responsible for his or her own lot in life hinders a more realistic understanding of the influence of culture.

== Multicultural counselor competencies ==
In 1982, Sue published a paper that described how traditional counseling approaches were irrelevant to the minorities, and that there needs to be a push for new ways of counseling that are more appropriate to the culturally different. He realized that minority experiences have been analyzed from a Eurocentric point of view, and that the field needed universal competencies that all multicultural counselors should have, which are certain beliefs/attitudes, knowledge, and skills.

- Beliefs/attitudes: Counselors are culturally aware, sensitive to their own ethnicity and value other cultures. They're aware of their own biases and are comfortable with their differences from their client. Every counselor has their own implicit biases, even if they have high self-reported multicultural competencies.
- Knowledges: Counselors should have a thorough understanding of the sociopolitical system, especially of how it treats minorities. They should know specific knowledge about the specific group they're working with, and be aware of institutional barriers which prevent minorities from using mental health services.
- Skills: Counselors should be able to generate, send, and receive a variety of verbal and nonverbal responses. They should be able to analyze and evaluate the degree to which their privileged background influences their professional and personal life experiences.

In 2017, the APA adopted 10 multicultural guidelines to give psychologists a universal framework for their services to minorities. In these guidelines, psychologists must:

1. Understand that a person's identity is fluid and complex
2. Know their own attitudes and beliefs can influence how they interact with and perceive others
3. Realize how important communication is
4. Understand how a client's social and physical environments can affect them
5. Know how historical and present experiences can cause power, privilege and oppression dynamics
6. Promote culturally adaptive interventions
7. Utilize the fields assumptions within an international context
8. Know how events in clients lives can intersect with more macro level sociocultural context and how it can impact the client's identity
9. Do culturally appropriate research and experiments
10. Use a strength based approach.

== Ways of assessing those competencies ==
The MAKSS (Multicultural awareness-knowledge-skills survey) consists of 60 items with 20 items for each Attitude, Knowledge and Skill area. The MCI (Multicultural Counseling Inventory) tests multicultural counseling skills, awareness, knowledge, and relationship. The MCKAS (Multicultural counseling knowledge and awareness scale) is an extension of MCAS and is a 32 item measure that tests general knowledge (just knowledge and awareness). All three of these measures have strong reliability and validity. However, these are all self report measures. The first observer rating of multicultural competence was the CCCI (Cross cultural counseling Inventory). It was developed to see a counselors effectiveness with culturally diverse clients, awareness of socio political issues, and cultural sensitivity, and it also requires a supervisor to observe and rate students. Revisions of these scales still take place.

== Multicultural Therapy In Action ==
American Indian and Alaska natives struggle with suicide and drug use than any other ethnic group. Psychologists have tried to use Western evidence based strategies on these groups, but it hasn't worked. More recently, psychologists have found out that a lot of the struggles are because they feel disconnected with their heritage and that previous practices haven't worked because they weren't using indigenous cultural practices to help them heal. Four examples of psychologists using their multicultural competencies are presented:

=== Four innovative programs ===
1. Yup’ik Alaska native connections between the younger and older generations have declines, so psychologists developed an intervention called Gungasvik (translated to 'toolbox') where they teach the youth ancestral traditions. People in higher intensity condition of Gungasvik experienced more protection from suicide, and the youths reported higher levels of beliefs and experiences that made life enjoyable and meaningful.

2. Psychologists implemented CBT in the White Mountain Apache tribe, but tribal representatives felt like something could be added: spirituality should be a part of the treatment. After that, instead of triangular CBT Model (thinking, feeling, doing), the model became a rectangle of thoughts, feelings, behavior and spirituality. Tribal members who have suicidal thoughts can meet with community mental health specialist who use traditional spiritual prayers and songs combined with recovery efforts, and the older tribe members talk to children about tribal values and take them on field trips to sacred sites. Suicide deaths in the tribe dropped 38 percent from 2006 to 2012.

3. Nurses who were of Native American descent screened Cheyenne, Arapaho and other tribes for depression, alcohol misuse, tobacco use, etc. and would see the clients that same day. There was a good response in the tribe because they found that the clients liked talking to centers mental health professional because they understood their traditions and heritage. Sharing cultural knowledge allowed for trust, and as patients felt better they spread the word to other tribes about their positive experience.

4. Great Plains Indians were emotionally scarred from seeing discrimination and sighs. The tribe is very communal so they thought they could benefit from group meetings that let them share discrimination and experience healing together. Interventions should address the family of the struggling individual since the family bond is a big part of their culture. Community members who stopped drinking were more engaged in cultural activities so a goal of the new program was to work with the community to make cultural activities more accessible.

== Recommendations for future research on multicultural counseling ==
Multicultural counseling is still a new lens for counseling and is in need of future research. Some areas of future research include using real clients and real counseling scenarios, using qualitative research, research that explores all the roles a multicultural counselor needs, and research that assesses the client, counselor and supervisor in multicultural counseling and training.
