= Ani Kalayjian =

Syrian Armenian-American psychologist, author

- Born: Syria
- Education: Columbia University
- Occupations: Psychologist, author
- Known for: Founding Meaningful World

Ani Kalayjian (born in Syria) is a Syrian Armenian-American psychologist, academic, author, and poet. She is currently a professor of psychology at Fordham University. She is the author of Forget Me NOT: 7 Steps for Healing Our Body, Mind, Spirit, and Soul and with Dominique Eugene she is the co-author of Mass Trauma and Emotional Healing Around the World: Rituals and Practices for Resilience and Meaning-making.

== Biography ==
Kalayjian was born in Syria, one of seven children of Diramayr Zabell Kalayjian and Kevork Kalayjian. In 1960, she emigrated with her family from Syria to the United States. She is the descendant of survivors of the Armenian Genocide.

She is a graduate of Columbia University’s Teachers College with Master’s and Doctoral Degrees, and holds an Honorary Doctor of Science Degree from Long Island University. She is the founder and President of the Association for Trauma Outreach & Prevention (ATOP), Meaningfulworld. Since 1998, she has consulted the United Nations, and more recently has been the representative of ATOP Meaningfulworld at the UN. She is an editor and author of numerous books and scholarly articles. For the International Journal of School and Cognitive Phycology with Lorrain Simmons she co=authored the essay Meaningful World’s 11th Humanitarian Mission to Haiti Sustainable Community Healing, Peace-Building, and Meaning-Making for a Healthy Haiti.

The organization she founded, Meaningful World, has for the past 21 years brought her and her team to nearly 25 countries ravaged by earthquakes, tornadoes, tsunamis, and other natural disasters. Most recently, the organization traveled to Haiti to provide mental health rehabilitation to those affected by the earthquake. During the Covid19 pandemic she was interviewed on Bronxnet Community Television on trauma and its effect on the Black community during the crisis. and she co-authored the article "Mental Health Challenges of a Global Pandemic: The Case of COVID-19" in Trauma Psychology News".

Other articles she has authored or co-authored have been published in scholarly journals including "Gender and genocide: Armenian and Greek women finding positive meaning in the horror", "Posttraumatic Stress and Meaning Making in Mexico City", and "Chapter 11: Professional Roles and Attributes of the Transcultural Nurse".

Kalayjian is also a registered nurse and has been consulted at various times by major news organizations on people's mood in relation to the weather and more specially seasonal mood disorder.
