= Merle Keitel =

American psychologist and academic

Merle Keitel is an American psychologist and academic and is currently the director of Training Counseling and Counseling Psychology in the Division of Psychological and Educational Services at the Fordham University Graduate School of Education.

== Biography ==
Keitel obtained her BS degree in psychology at the Binghamton University and her PhD degree in Counseling Psychology from the State University of New York at Buffalo. She is also a licensed psychologist. She worked as a clinical research associate at Roswell Park Comprehensive Cancer Center in Buffalo, New York and in private practice.

Keitel's Professorial focus is centered around the subjects of individual counseling and psychotherapy and counseling theory and process.

Keitel teaches several graduate courses at Fordham University, including Clinical Instruction Application of Theory to Practice, Clinical Instruction and Counseling Process, Counseling Theory and Practice, Doctoral Practicum in Counseling Psychology I: Humanistic, Field Experience in Counseling I/II and Foundations in Professional Counseling and Consultation.

== Publications ==
Along with Mary Kopala, Keitel co-wrote Counseling Women with Breast Cancer (SAGE Publications, 2000) and co-edited the first edition of the Handbook of Counseling Women (SAGE Publications, 2003). She has penned multiple sections of volumes and articles on issues related to women's issues and health psychology such as cancer, infertility and miscarriage, PCOS, and eating disorders.

Keitel's other publications include "The role of patient attachment and working alliance on patient adherence, satisfaction, and health-related quality of life in lupus treatment" (Patient Education and Counseling, October 2011), "Salient Stressors for Mothers of Children and Adolescents With Anorexia Nervosa" (Eating Disorders, October 2010) and “Predictors of distress in women being treated for infertility” (Journal of Reproductive and Infant Psychology, August 2009)

== Awards ==
- Scanlon Award from Fordham
- the James C. Hansen Humanitarian Award from SUNY Buffalo Graduate School of Education
