= William J. Duane (Jesuit) =

Jesuit priest and president of Fordham University

Reverend William J. Duane S.J.
- Born: March , 1868; New York, NY
- Occupation: Jesuit Priest
- Title: President

Academic background
- Education: St. Francis Xavier College

William J. Duane was a Jesuit priest and President of Fordham University in the Bronx, NY, from 1924 until 1930. Fr. Duane was born in March 1868 in New York, NY. Prior to being appointed President of Fordham University, he graduated from St. Francis Xavier College (later to become Xavier High School) in 1887, after which he went on to study at Boston College and then teach theology at Woodstock College for nineteen years. He was fifty-seven years old when he came to Fordham.

Duane oversaw several noteworthy events in Fordham University's development, including the completion of the Rose Hill campus gymnasium, which, having been undertaken in 1923, was dedicated in 1925. Shortly after the dedication of Rose Hill Gymnasium, work was begun on a new library, the first of five buildings that Duane would see built. This significant expansion of the university's facilities occurred during a period of notable growth within the infrastructure of the American Catholic Church; Duane's emphasis on the building, expansion and renovation of university facilities can be seen to reflect this trend within the church during this time period. Duane Library, located on the university's Rose Hill campus and later repurposed into an administrative building, was dedicated in Duane's honor after the completion of his service to the university in 1930. In addition to growing the university's infrastructure, the university's Reserve Officers' Training Corps (ROTC) program was established in 1926.
