= Augustus Thébaud =

French jesuit (1807–1885)

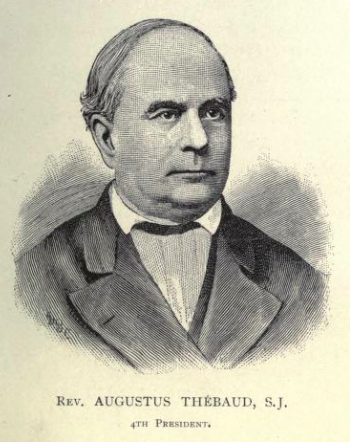
Augustus Thébaud, in 1891

Augustus Thébaud (20 November 1807 – 17 December 1885) was a French-American Jesuit educator and publicist.

== Life ==
Thébaud was born at Nantes, France. He studied at first in the preparatory seminary at Nantes, then entered the grand séminaire and was ordained to the secular priesthood at the usual age. After three years of parochial work in his native city, he entered the Society of Jesus in Italy, on 27 November 1835, whence he returned to France in 1837 to pursue a course of scientific studies at the Sorbonne under Ampère and others.

He landed in the United States on 18 December 1838, and was called to the chair of chemistry at St. Mary's College, Kentucky, where he became rector in 1846. Before the end of that year, however, the Jesuits left Kentucky to take charge of St. John's College, Fordham, New York, which had been transferred to them from the Diocese of New York by Bishop Hughes. Thébaud was the first Jesuit President of St. John's, a position which he held from 1846 to 1851 and again from 1860 to 1863.

In the interval he taught the sciences for two years, 1851–52, under John Larkin, and the following eight years he spent as the pastor of St. Joseph's Church, Troy. To this charge he returned after his second rectorship at Fordham and filled the position from 1863 to 1869, and again from 1873 to 1874. The intervening years we find him at first in Montreal and then at St. Joseph's Church, Hudson City, New Jersey. After spending another year at Fordham, he was assigned to St. Francis Xavier's parish, New York, where he passed the rest of his days. He died at St. John's College in 1885, and was buried in the University Cemetery.

== Works ==
Thébaud wrote a series of books on religious and historical subjects and published, besides numerous articles in the "Catholic World" and the "Catholic Quarterly Review", two novels, Louisa Kirkbride: A Tale of New York (1879), and The Twit Twats: A Christmas Allegorical Story of Birds (1881).

His more important works are:

- The Irish Race in the Past and in the Present (1873);
- The Church and the Gentile World (2 vols., 1878);
- The Church and the Moral World (1881).

From 1875 to his death, he also prepared his reminiscences in three volumes. Of these the United States Catholic Historical Society published volume III (1904), giving an account of his American experiences, and volume I (1911), containing the recollections of his life in France.
