= Edward P. Tivnan =

Father Edward P. Tivnan S.J.
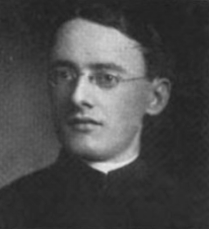
- Born: March 10, 1882; Salem, MA
- Died: March 31, 1937 (aged 55); Manhattan, New York, NY
- Occupation: President of Fordham University

Academic background
- Education: Georgetown University

Academic work
- Discipline: Chemistry

Edward Patrick Tivnan, S.J. (1882–1937) was president of Fordham University from 1919 until 1924.

== Biography ==
Edward P. Tivnan was born in Massachusetts on March 10, 1882.

Tivnan was appointed president of the university after the retirement of Joseph Mulry earlier that year. He was thirty-seven, making him the youngest Jesuit priest to serve in that role in over three decades. He held a doctorate in chemistry from Georgetown University, and had been regent of the Fordham University Medical School for two years previous to becoming president.

One of Tivnan's major decisions as president was regarding the university's medical school, an institution that had struggled to stay afloat since its opening some years earlier; lack of funds and low enrollment meant that unless sufficient funding could be found immediately, the school would have to be closed. After exploring several other avenues, including appealing to Archbishop Patrick Hayes, the Archbishop of New York at the time, for financial help, Tivnan was forced to announce the closing of the university's medical school in 1921.

In 1920, Tivnan oversaw the opening of the university's school of accounting, originally housed in the Woolworth Building. This would go on to become the Gabelli School of Business. Another noteworthy achievement was the enrollment of the first Black woman in the Fordham School of Law, Ruth Whitehead Whaley, in 1921. Whaley would later be appointed secretary of the New York City Board of Estimate.

Fordham University's Rose Hill Gymnasium was constructed during Tivnan's time as university president, being completed in January 1924. The gymnasium was officially opened in 1925.

In 1910, previous to Tivnan's appointment as president, he was serving as a chemistry instructor at the university when he installed a seismograph in the basement of an administrative building on the Bronx campus. Today the facility is the oldest seismography station in New York City, and is part of the National Seismic Network, reporting to the United States Geological Survey in Boulder, Colorado. The seismography station was officially dedicated and opened in 1924, shortly after Tivnan left Fordham University.

Tivnan died in 1937, twenty-seven years after leaving the position of president at Fordham University. He was 55 years old.
