= John B. Harley =

Reverend John B. Harley
- Died: December 8, 1846; New York City, New York
- Known for: President of Fordham University

The Reverend John B. Harley was the third President of Fordham University from 1843 to 1845.

There is little known about Harley before his brief time at St. John's. The college did not maintain data about his early life, and the Church does not name him in their records.

== St. John's College--Fordham University ==
During the early years of St. John's College, Archbishop John Hughes administered the school from Manhattan. Hughes was keen to having Harley join the faculty because of his prior teaching experience at Emmitsburg. Hughes requested that Harley join the faculty at St. John's and leave his position at Mount St. Mary's College and the Seminary in Emmitsburg. The request was granted, and Harley taught bookkeeping and served as the school’s first dean of students (also referred to as: first prefect of discipline) at St. John's. When Ambrose Manahan was president, John Harley felt it necessary to write to Hughes expressing his concerns with Manahan's presidency. "The seminarians, he said, were on the brink of rebellion, and New York risked losing them to another diocese." Harley was so distressed that he offered Hughes his resignation. Hughes refused to accept it and instead fired Manahan and gave the position to Harley. Harley was twenty-seven years old when he became president of St. John's, and despite his age, he was able to take command of the school and repair the damage done by Manahan. However, in 1845 he grew seriously ill and resigned from his position. Hughes brought Harley overseas, to London, Dublin, and Paris, to search for a treatment, but he was unable to recover. On December 8, 1846, at thirty years old, Harley died at Hughes' home in NYC.

Academic offices
Preceded by Ambrose Manahan	President of Fordham University; 1843–1845	Succeeded by James Roosevelt Bayley
