= Daniel J. Quinn =

American academic administrator and Jesuit

Father Daniel J. Quinn S.J.
- Born: May 12, 1864
- Died: March 9, 1940 (aged 75)
- Occupation: President of Fordham University

Fr. Daniel J. Quinn, S.J., was president of Fordham University from 1906 until 1911. Fordham University is a Jesuit institution, the main campus of which is located in the Bronx. Born in 1864, Quinn was appointed president of the university at age 42, eighteen years after entering the Society of Jesus.

The first noteworthy event of Quinn's tenure as university president was the resignation of the dean of the ailing School of Medicine, a graduate school that would continue to struggle until its dissolution in 1921. The university also began offering an M.A. degree to students who completed two years of professional studies during these early days of Quinn's leadership, and the institution's name was officially changed from St. John's College to Fordham University in 1907.

Questions regarding the university's campus and the ideal location of each of its schools were frequently debated during these years. Much of the property owned by the university was still undeveloped, and in 1908, a developer offered to purchase a large swathe of the campus, an offer that was rejected by Quinn despite the University struggling financially. Soon after, a 240-acre estate in Scarborough known as Sleepy Hollow was offered for sale to the university. Quinn considered purchasing the estate and moving the high school to that location, but the sale was not made, and Fordham Preparatory School continues to be housed at the main university campus even today. There was some debate regarding the location of Woodstock College as well; between 1908 and 1911, the sale of twenty acres of the university campus for the relocation of the Jesuit seminary was discussed, but ultimately the seminary was moved to Yonkers.

In 1910, Fr. Quinn dissolved the university's football team, which was the second time football had been discontinued at Fordham. The team would be reinstated in 1911.

The financial situation of the university during Quinn's tenure was bleak, and in 1910, the university applied for a $200,000 mortgage to pay for an extension of the science hall and a new building in which to house the medical school. Construction for the new building began in 1911, shortly before a new president was appointed to the university.

Fr. Quinn died in 1940. He was 75 years old.
