= Fordham Graduate School of Social Service =

Fordham Graduate School of Social Service (GSS)
- Established: 1916
- Parent institution: Fordham University
- Religious affiliation: Jesuit
- Dean: Debra McPhee
- Location: Bronx, Manhattan, and West Harrison, New York, United States; 40.76961°N 73.98343°W
- Campus: Urban
- Website: fordham.edu

Fordham Graduate School of Social Service is the graduate school for social work of Fordham University.

== History ==
The Graduate School of Social Work was founded in 1916 and is typically considered one of the oldest and largest social work schools in the United States.

Originally located in the Leon Lowenstein Center at Fordham's Lincoln Center campus, the School has since expanded to offer instruction across three of Fordham's campuses in the New York City area. The school expanded in 1975, 1997, and 2008.

GSS expanded their program in 2014 to include a hybrid model of study allowing students the option to take courses online and at Molloy College. Today, the School offers in-person, hybrid, and fully online programs.

== Centers & Institutes ==
GSS hosts a number of centers, initiatives, and institutes as part of their mission statement to promote human rights and social justice. These programs often focus on specialized issues and research interests, they include:

- The Beck Institute on Religion and Poverty
- Children and Families Institute
- Fordham Center for Nonprofit Leaders
- Institute for Women and Girls
- Henry C. Ravazzin Center on Aging and Intergenerational Studies

== Accreditation ==
The School is fully accredited by the Council on Social Work Education and is authorized to award baccalaureate and master's degrees in Social Work.

== Rankings and reputation ==
In 2024, U.S. News & World Report ranked the School of Service 28th out of 319 programs nationwide.

== See also ==
- List of social work schools
