= Patrick F. Dealy =

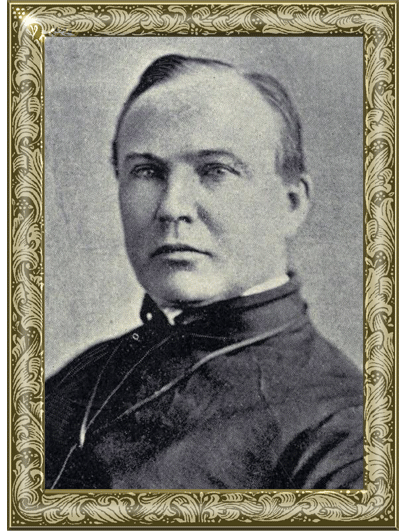
- Born: April 7, 1827; Rathkeale, County Limerick, Ireland
- Died: December 23, 1891 (aged 64); New York, New York, United States
- Burial place: Fordham University Cemetery

Patrick F. Dealy was a Jesuit priest and the eleventh president of St. John's College (now Fordham University) from 1882 to 1885.

== Early years ==
Dealy was born on April 7, 1827, in Rathkeale, County Limerick, Ireland. Little is known about his early life, except that his family emigrated to America when he was young. Dealy began his education in NYC public schools, but in 1843 he started his studies at St. John's Grammar Department; which later became known as the Second Division; today it is Fordham Preparatory School. Three years later, in 1846, he was a part of the first graduating class of the Grammar Department. Later in the year Dealy entered the Society of Jesuits, and became "the first Fordham student to become a Jesuit, although ironically, he had not had any Jesuits as teachers during his Prep days." He finished his noviceship in 1848 and was sent to St. Mary's College in Montreal. He was the first teacher there who spoke English as their first language. Dealy's Jesuit education encouraged his travels abroad, and he spent time in Austria, France, Rome, Montreal, Belgium, and at St. John's.

== St. John's College/Fordham University ==
From 1852 to 1853 Dealy returned to NYC and taught Latin and Greek at the Grammar Department. He founded the Xavier Union during his time spent teaching at Xavier, which is now the Catholic Union. He was the first Fordham student to become president of the college. In 1853 "the rector (probably Larkin) noted that Dealy's 'ingenium,' or intelligence and proficiency in literature, were only 'mediocre,' and his special talent was for teaching the younger boys. In those days, this was not a ringing endorsement." For the next few decades Dealy taught on again and off again at the college level, and while teaching at Xavier he founded the Xavier Union. The club was later renamed the Catholic Club, but it was wildly popular and have one thousand members. Regardless of the rector's initial opinion in 1853, Dealy did become the rector of St. John's College in 1882.

His time at St. John's marked a new era for the college as he implemented several reforms and continued to architecturally expand the college. One of the initial changes Dealy made was to restore the student's print publications, and in 1882 the Monthly began publication. He also supported the baseball team and introduced football to the college, he improved Rose Hill's appearance by establishing Macadam roads and planting trees, he began refurnishing St. John's Hall, and constructing the foundation of the Science Building, today known as Thébaud Hall. Dealy did not just focus on sports and building projects, but also dedicated time to modernizing the curriculum and established a three-year bachelor of science program. "One last innovation of Dealy's was the establishment of the Fordham Cadet Corps. After an earlier administration had made an unsuccessful attempt to initiate a program of military training on campus, Father Dealy succeeded in October 1885. By 1888, 150 students in three companies, including a company of Second Divisioners, or Prep boys, were engaged in this training, the forerunner of Fordham's ROTC."

Dealy helped distance St. John's from the French Jesuit influence, and integrated the college into New York and American culture.

== Later years ==
In 1885 he resigned from his position, and dedicated the remaining years of his life to working in the parishes. He served at a variety of parishes in Boston and Philadelphia before being appointed at St. Lawrence Church in Manhattan. Dealy died in New York City on December 22, 1891, from pneumonia and diabetes, and was buried in the College Cemetery across from the Prep school. In 1931, he was memorialized with the renaming of First Division Hall to Dealy Hall.
