= Joseph Shea (Jesuit) =

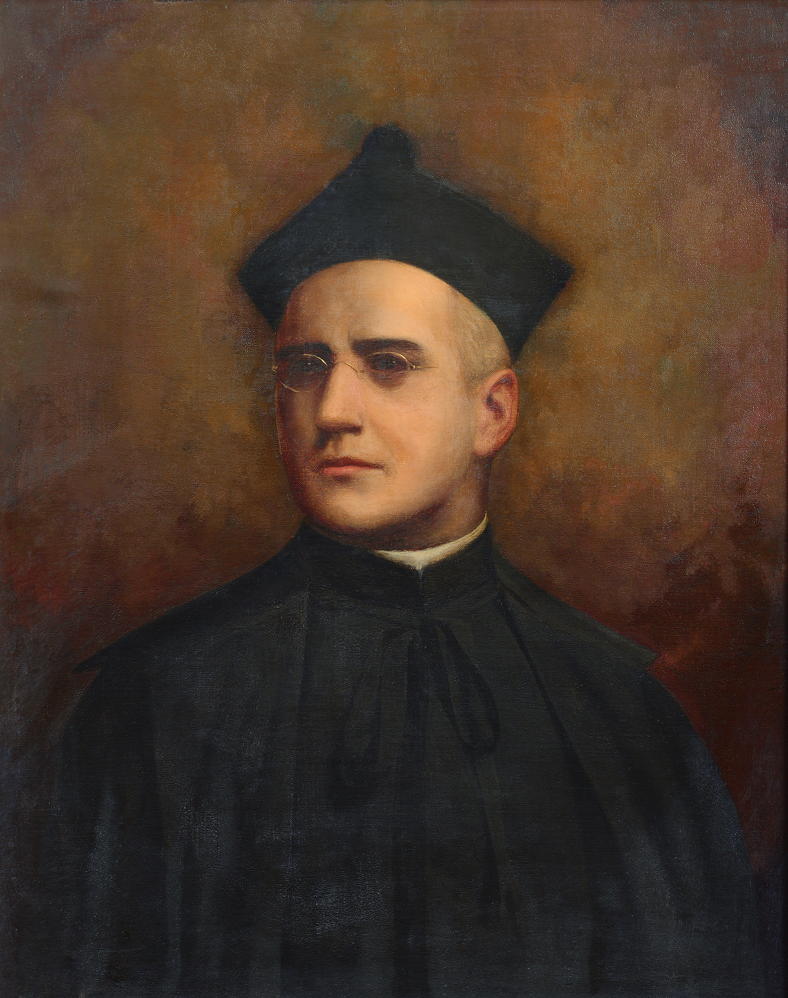
- Born: December 31, 1829; Quebec, Lower Canada
- Died: December 5, 1881 (aged 51); New York, New York

Joseph Shea (1829–1881) was a Jesuit priest and president of St. John's College (now Fordham University) from 1868 to 1874.

== Early years ==
Joseph Shea was born in Quebec, Lower Canada on December 31, 1829. At the age of 21, he entered the Jesuits, and upon completing his course of studies, became an ordained priest.

== St. John's College ==
He became the tenth president of St. John's College (now known as Fordham University) in 1868, and held the office until 1874. Shea's tenure was notable for his introduction in 1869 of reforms to the curriculum, disciplinary practices, and student housing, largely in response to student dissatisfaction. In 1868, students had organized a conspiracy to transfer to the College of St. Francis Xavier during the semester break. Since those students would not return to Rose Hill after Christmas break, they were prepared to destroy the windows of the college buildings. The conspiracy was thwarted and its leaders expelled. Shea tried to ease the tension through numerous concessions, including the introduction of a smoking room, permitting some students to live in private rooms on the upper floors seminaries, and by introducing a six year commercial course of studies as an alternative to the classics-based curriculum. These concessions and reforms were met with opposition from the other Jesuits and failed to end the dissatisfaction of the students.

In 1874, Shea left his position as president and was assigned to the College of St. Francis Xavier. He died in New York on December 5, 1881.

== Legacy ==
While Shea was unable to make all the improvements he wanted, during his presidency the arrival of Father Thomas J.A. Freeman ensured a new focus on sciences at St. John's College. With Shea's support, Freeman was given space in the diocesan seminary building (today's St. John's Hall) to develop a science department and laboratory. Shea's successors continued to support Freeman's scientific curiosities, and Freeman was later instrumental in the introduction of electricity and electrical lighting on the Fordham campus.

Shea's attempt to expand the so-called commercial course (as opposed to the "classics course" based on the traditional Jesuit curriculum known as Ratio studiorum) was short-lived, but the commercial course would prove over the long-term to be lucrative.
