= Edward Doucet =

Edward Doucet, SJ
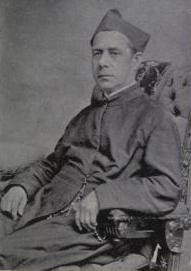
- Born: March 12, 1825; Three Rivers, Canada
- Died: December 9, 1890 (aged 65); New York City, United States of America
- Known for: Seventh President of Fordham University

Edward Doucet (March 12, 1825 – December 9, 1890) was an American Jesuit academic who was the seventh President of Fordham University.

== Early life ==
Edward Doucet was born March 12, 1825, in Trois-Rivières, Canada. He attended St. Mary's College in Montreal and studied classics, and after finishing he entered the Society of Jesus on September 7, 1844. Shortly after entering the society, he was sent to pursue his Jesuit studies at St. John's College (now Fordham University).

== St. John's College ==
On September 8, 1846, he pronounced his Jesuit vows at St. John's, becoming one of the first of many Jesuits to pronounce their vows there. For the next four years he taught the youngest students as a scholastic. Before taking on more responsibilities at St. John's, Doucet briefly taught at Xavier High School from 1851 to 1853. After two years of teaching at Xavier, he returned to St. John's and finished his theological and philosophical studies. In 1859 he became vice president of the college, and was also the prefect of studies, of health, and of discipline. In 1861 he also filled the open Master of Novices position, and also acted as the librarian and moderator of the History club on campus. and two years later became the seventh rector of the college. During his time as president, he helped create the plans for the First Division building; he purchased a quarry and built a stone gatehouse, which has since been relocated to the center of campus and serves as the Honors Program house.

== Later life ==
Doucet's time as rector was short lived due to health issues, and after his first year he went to France to take care of his health. During his time away he was involved in pastoral work in Lille and the Jesuit college at Amiens, where he also acted as a professor of English. Doucet spent the next thirteen years going from place to place; from his alma mater in Montreal to St. Johns, and then from St. Peter's in Jersey City to West Park on the Hudson. In 1883 he settled at St. John's, where he taught philosophy until his death on December 9, 1890.

== Edgar Allan Poe connection ==
In 1846, when Edgar Allan Poe's wife Virginia was ill, he rented a cottage in the Bronx; a cottage down the road from St. John's college. After Virginia died, Poe passed his days by going on long walks around his cottage and the college. During one of his walks he met Doucet, and the two became friends. Poe spent time talking to Doucet in French, and on several occasions listened to Doucet play the organ; Doucet was a respectable musician. Doucet became Poe's confessor because, despite the fact that he was only twenty-three, he had "the same personal qualities that in later years made him well known as a counselor and confessor--discretion, a straightforward manner, and enormous sympathy."

Doucet's "ill health and diminishing eyesight in his final years prevented him from putting finishing touches on his voluminous essay of historical subjects...Doucet's written reminiscences of Edgar Allan Poe would have been specially appreciated. Perhaps Fr. Doucet's personal shyness and dislike of the limelight had something to do with his not publishing."
