= John Scully (Jesuit) =

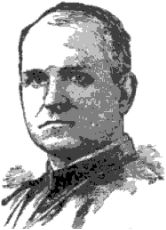
- Born: September 23, 1846; Brooklyn, New York
- Died: December 26, 1917 (aged 71); New York, New York
- Education: Stonyhurst College; Woodstock College
- Occupation(s): Clergyman, educator

John Scully (September 23, 1846 – December 26, 1917) was an American Jesuit priest and president of Fordham University.

== Life ==
John Scully was born in Brooklyn, New York on September 23, 1846. He was educated at Sault-au-Récollet in Canada, Stonyhurst College in England, and Woodstock College. After a period working as a salesman, he joined the Society of Jesus in 1872.

Scully was ordained in 1879 and worked as Treasurer of Woodstock College in Woodstock, Maryland. He was the president of Fordham University from 1888 to 1892. He took positions at a number of colleges, was appointed pastor of St. Joseph's Church in Philadelphia in 1892, and worked there until 1901. On May 13, 1900, Father Scully related to his parishioners the story told by the former Confederate spy Olivia Floyd about how her mother Sarah Semmes Floyd witnessed a boat that was sent from Mt. Vernon to pick up Father Leonard Neale one night in December 1799 so that he could visit George Washington before the former president died. Father Scully worked as an assistant pastor at St. Francis Xavier's Church until he became ill and died on December 26, 1917, at St. Vincent's Hospital.
