= Hamro =

Hamro (lit. 'Our' in Nepali) may refer to:

== Political parties ==
- Hamro Sikkim Party, a regional political party in Sikkim, India
- Indian Gorkha Janshakti Front, a political party in GTA, India
- Hamro Nepali Party, a political party in Nepal formed in 2022

== Media and literature ==
- Hamro Team, a 2011 Nepali television drama series
- Hamro Lok Sanskriti, a 1956 book on Nepali folk culture by Satya Mohan Joshi

== Technology and apps ==
- Hamro Patro, a Nepali calendar app offering news, horoscopes, radio, and more
- Hamro.com, an independent digital portal offering localized tools, online radio and more
- Hamro, a light weight android/iOS app which offers chat, OTP and alerts.

== E-commerce and business ==
- Hamrobazar, an online classified marketplace in Nepal
- Hamro Nirman, a construction materials and services platform in Nepal
- Car Hamro, a platform for buying and selling vehicles in Nepal
- Hamro plc, a UK-based part exchange company serving the construction industry

== Events ==
- Hamro Utsav, a student-led annual festival hosted by King's College, Kathmandu
