= Woolworth Building =

Skyscraper in Manhattan, New York

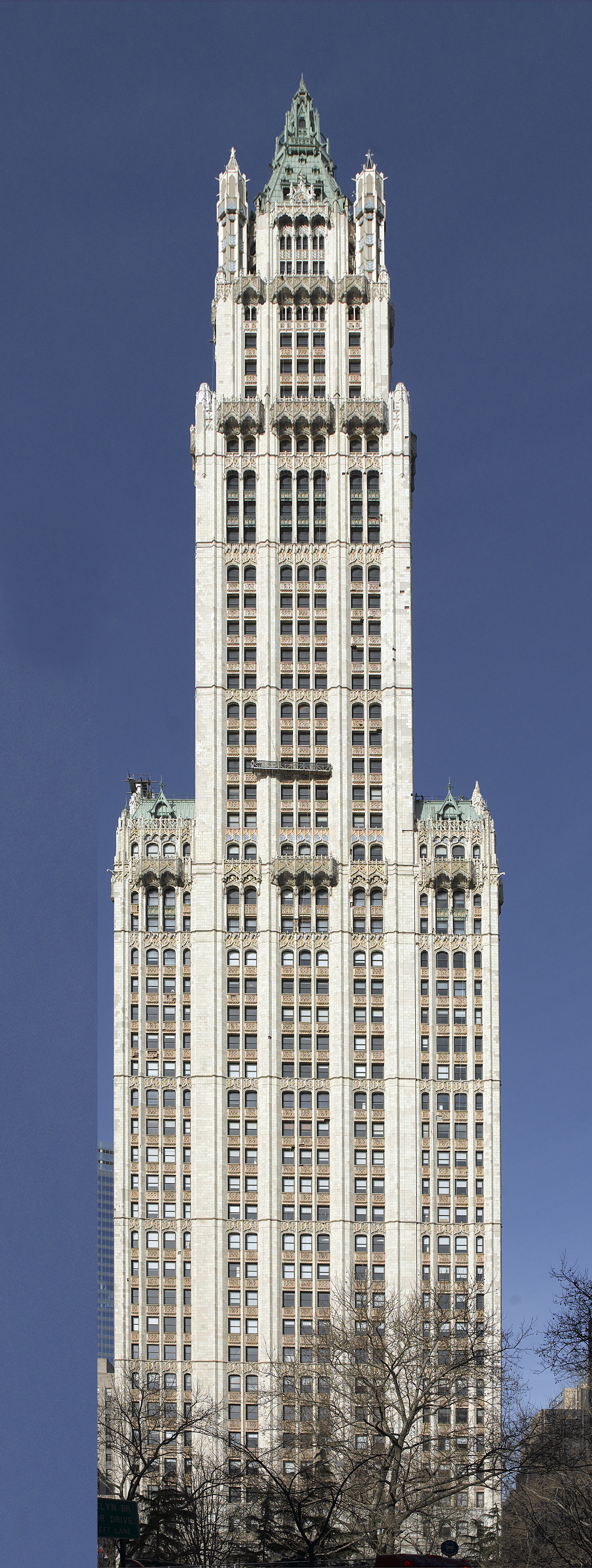
- The Woolworth Building in 2009

Record height
- Tallest in the world from 1913 to 1930^{[I]}
- Preceded by: Metropolitan Life Insurance Company Tower
- Surpassed by: 40 Wall Street

General information
- Architectural style: Neo-Gothic
- Location: 233 Broadway; Manhattan, New York, US
- Construction started: November 4, 1910; 116 years ago
- Topped-out: July 1, 1912; 114 years ago
- Completed: 1912
- Opening: April 24, 1913; 113 years ago
- Renovated: 1977–1981
- Cost: US$13.5 million (equivalent to $440,000,000 in 2025)
- Owner: Witkoff Group, Cammeby's International (bottom 30 floors); KC Properties (top 30 floors)

Height
- Roof: 792 ft (241 m)

Technical details
- Floor count: 55
- Lifts/elevators: 34

Design and construction
- Architect: Cass Gilbert
- Developer: F. W. Woolworth
- Structural engineer: Gunvald Aus and Kort Berle
- Main contractor: Thompson–Starrett Co.

Renovating team
- Renovating firm: Ehrenkrantz Group

Website
- woolworthbuilding.com
- Woolworth Building
- U.S. National Register of Historic Places
- U.S. National Historic Landmark
- New York State Register of Historic Places
- New York City Landmark
- Location within New York City Location within New York Location within the United States
- Coordinates: 40°42′44″N 74°00′29″W
- Area: 0.5 acres (0.2 ha)
- NRHP reference No.: 66000554
- NYSRHP No.: 06101.001790
- NYCL No.: 1121, 1273

Significant dates
- Added to NRHP: November 13, 1966
- Designated NHL: November 13, 1966
- Designated NYSRHP: June 23, 1980
- Designated NYCL: April 12, 1983

The Woolworth Building is a 792-foot-tall (241 m) residential building and early skyscraper at 233 Broadway in the Tribeca neighborhood of Lower Manhattan in New York City, United States. Designed by Cass Gilbert in the Neo-Gothic style, the Woolworth Building was originally an office skyscraper. It was the tallest building in the world from 1913 to 1930, and it remains one of the United States' 100 tallest buildings as of 2024.

The Woolworth Building is bounded by Broadway and City Hall Park to its east, Park Place to its north, and Barclay Street to its south. It consists of a 30-story base topped by a 30-story tower. Its facade is mostly clad with architectural terracotta, though the lower portions are limestone, and it features thousands of windows. The ornate lobby contains various sculptures, mosaics, and architectural touches. The structure was designed with several amenities and attractions, including an observatory on the 57th floor and a private swimming pool in the basement.

Frank W. Woolworth was the founder of F. W. Woolworth Company, a popular five-and-ten-cent store, and he conceived the skyscraper as a headquarters for his company. Woolworth planned it jointly with the Irving Trust, which also agreed to use the structure as its headquarters. The Woolworth Building had been planned as a 12- to 16-story commercial structure, but it underwent several revisions during its planning process. Its final height was not decided upon until January 1911. Construction started in 1910 and was completed two years later. The building officially opened on April 24, 1913.

The Woolworth Building has undergone several changes throughout its history. The facade was cleaned in 1932, and the building received an extensive renovation between 1977 and 1981. The Irving National Exchange Bank moved its headquarters to 1 Wall Street in 1931, but the Woolworth Company (later Venator Group) continued to own the Woolworth Building for most of the 20th century. The structure was sold to the Witkoff Group in 1998. The top 30 floors were sold to a developer in 2012 and converted into residences. Office and commercial tenants use the rest of the building. The Woolworth Building has been a National Historic Landmark since 1966, and a New York City designated landmark since 1983.

== Architecture ==
Cass Gilbert designed the Woolworth Building in the neo-Gothic style. The building resembles European Gothic cathedrals; Reverend S. Parkes Cadman dubbed it "The Cathedral of Commerce" in a booklet published in 1916. F. W. Woolworth, who had devised the idea for the Woolworth Building, had proposed using the Victoria Tower as a model for the building; he reportedly also admired the design of Palace of Westminster. Gilbert, by contrast, disliked the comparison to religious imagery. The architect ultimately used 15th- and 16th-century Gothic ornament on the Woolworth Building, along with a complementary color scheme. Though the building's steel frame was uncommon to neo-Gothic structures, its facade emphasizes vertical design elements, similarly to other neo-Gothic buildings.

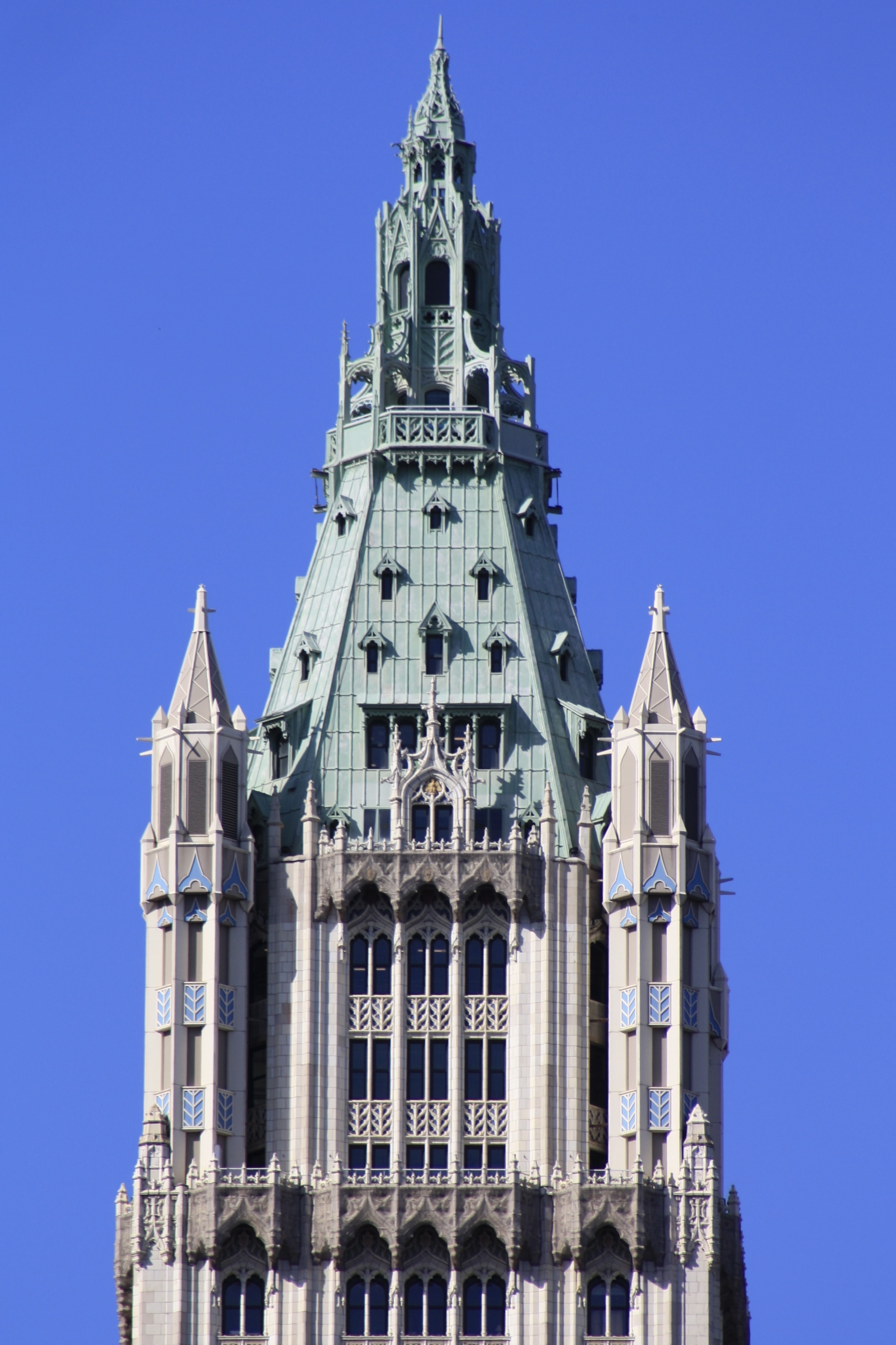
The building's crown

The Woolworth Building was designed to be 420 feet (130 m) high but was eventually raised to 792 feet (241 m). (Note: Different sources gave varying accounts, and even the building's own pamphlets gave different figures. A building permit issued in April 1911 listed the height as 750 feet (230 m) with 51 usable floors, while Engineering Record in 1913 gave the building's height as 782.5 ft (238.5 m) from ground floor to the pinnacle of the building's flagpole, with 55 usable floors. A 1913 brochure for the building gave the height as 784 ft (239 m); a 1916 brochure quoted 792 ft (241 m); and a 1995 brochure gave a height of 792 ft (241 m), with 60 stories "from subbasement to tower".) Several different height measurements have been cited over the years, but the building rises about 793.5 feet (241.9 m) above the lowest point of the site. The Woolworth Building was 60 stories tall when completed in 1913, though this consisted of 53 usable floors topped by several mechanical floors. (Note: The New York City Landmarks Preservation Commission and Skyscraper Museum consider the building to have 53 usable stories. Architectural writers Sarah Landau and Carl Condit quote the building as having 55 usable stories (counting the tower as being 25 stories tall), and two below-ground levels. The count depends on whether the 55th-story former observation deck is included. There are no floors numbered 42, 48, or 52.) The building's ceiling heights, ranging from 11 to 20 feet (3.4 to 6.1 m), make it the equivalent of an 80-story building. It remained the tallest building in the world until 40 Wall Street and the Chrysler Building, both in New York City, were constructed in 1929–1930, and completed in 1930. The building is assigned its own ZIP Code, 10279; it was one of 41 buildings in Manhattan that had their own ZIP Codes as of 2019.

=== Form ===
The building's tower, flush with the main frontage on Broadway, joins an office block base with a narrow interior court for light. The base occupies the entire lot between Park Place to the north, Broadway to the east, and Barclay Street to the south. The site measures 155 feet (47 m) wide on Broadway and 200 feet (61 m) wide on both Park Place and Barclay Street. The base contains two "wings" extending westward, one each on the Park Place and Barclay Street frontages, which form a rough U-shape when combined with the Broadway frontage. This ensured that all offices had outside views. The U-shaped base is approximately 30 stories tall. All four elevations of the base are decorated, since the building has frontage on all sides.

The tower rises an additional 30 stories above the eastern side of the base, abutting Broadway. Above the 30th floor are setbacks on the north and south elevations. There are additional setbacks along the north, south, and west elevations on the 45th and 50th floors. The 30th through 45th floors measure 84 by 86 feet (25.6 by 26.2 m); the 46th through 50th floors, 69 by 71 feet (21 by 22 m); and the 51st through 53rd floors, 69 by 61 feet (21 by 19 m). The tower has a square plan below the 50th-story setback and an octagonal plan above. Though the structure is physically 60 stories tall, the 53rd floor is the top floor that can be occupied. Above the 53rd floor, the tower tapers into a pyramidal roof.

=== Facade ===
The lowest four stories are clad in limestone. (Note: Reynolds 1994, p. 216, and Nash 2005, p. 17, give a conflicting figure of three stories. This is because the second- and third-story windows are placed within the same arches, giving the impression of a single story. By this calculation, if the lowest section is cited as being three stories tall, then the U-shaped base is 29 stories tall.) Above that, the exterior of the Woolworth Building was cast in limestone-colored, glazed architectural terracotta panels. F. W. Woolworth initially wanted to clad the skyscraper in granite, while Gilbert wanted to use limestone. The decision to use terracotta for the facade was based on both aesthetic and functional concerns. Terracotta was not only fireproof but also, in Gilbert's mind, a purely ornamental addition clarifying the Woolworth Building's steel construction. Each panel was of a slightly different color, creating a polychrome effect. The facade appeared to have a uniform tone, but the upper floors were actually darker and more dense. Behind the terracotta panels were brick walls; the terracotta pieces are attached to the brick walls by metal rods and hangers.

The Atlantic Terra Cotta Company provided the original terracotta cladding. The panels were manufactured in shades of blue, green, sienna, and rose. The terracotta panels were partially vitrified, allowing them to bear large loads. Gilbert also asked that John Donnelly and Eliseo V. Ricci create full-size designs based on Atlantic Terra Cotta's models. In 1932, Atlantic Terra Cotta carried out a comprehensive cleaning campaign of the Woolworth's facade to remove blackening caused by the city's soot and pollution. The Ehrenkrantz Group restored the building's facade between 1977 and 1981. During the renovation, much of the terracotta was replaced with concrete and Gothic ornament was removed.

The building has several thousand windows: the exact number is disputed, but various sources state that the Woolworth Building has 2,843, 4,400, or 5,000 windows. Windows were included for lighting and comfort; because the Woolworth Building was built before air conditioning became common, every office is within 10 feet (3.0 m) of a window. Most of the windows are the same size, and each story is the same height. Some of the Woolworth Building's windows are set within arch-shaped openings. Most of the building's spandrels, or triangles between the top corners of the window and the top of the arch, have golden Gothic tracery against a bright blue backdrop. On the 25th, 39th, and 40th stories, the spandrels consist of iconography found in the royal coat of arms of the United Kingdom. Gold-on-blue tracery is also found on the 26th, 27th, and 42nd floors.

==== Base ====
On the part of the base facing Broadway, as well as the tower above it, there are three bays; the left and right bays have two windows per floor, while the center bay has three windows. The elevations facing Park Place and Barclay Street each have six bays with two windows per floor. The base, on its lowest four stories, is divided into three-story-high entrance and exit bays, each of which has a one-story attic above it. There are nine entrances in total.

The main entrance on Broadway is a three-story Tudor arch, surrounded on either side by two bays: one narrower than the main arch, the other wider. The five bays form a triumphal arch overhung by a balcony and stone motifs of Gothic design. The intrados of the arch contains 23 niches. The topmost niche depicts an owl; the lowest niches on both sides depict tree trunks; and the other twenty niches depict animated figures. The spandrel above the left side of the arch depicts Mercury, classical god of commerce, while that above the right side depicts Ceres, classical goddess of agriculture. Above all of this is an ogee arch with more niches, as well as two carvings of owls hovering above a "W" monogram. There are salamanders within niches on either side of the main entrance. Inside the triumphal arch, there is a smaller arch with a revolving door and a Tudor window; it is flanked by standard doors and framed with decorations. There is a pelican above this smaller arch.

Decorated revolving doors are also located at the northern and southern entrances, at Park Place and Barclay Street respectively. The Park Place and Barclay Street entrances are nearly identical, except for the arrangement of the storefronts. Both entrances are located on the eastern sides of their respective elevations, lining up with the tower above them, and contain a wide arch flanked by two narrower arches. The three entrances feed into the arcaded lobby. The building's Park Place entrance contained a stair to the New York City Subway's Park Place station, served by the 2 and 3 trains, inside the westernmost bay of the building entrance.

The facade contains vertical piers, which protrude diagonally. There are six such piers on the Broadway elevation. In addition, horizontal belt courses run above the 4th, 9th, 14th, 19th, and 24th stories. The 25th and 26th stories, above the topmost belt course, are separated by dark-bronze spandrels. The 27th floor contains a canopy of projecting terracotta ogee arches. These decorative features make the tower section "appear to merge with the atmosphere", as architectural writer Donald Reynolds described it. Above the 28th floor, a two-story-tall copper roof with complex tracery in the Gothic style tops the canopies. The 29th and 30th stories of the north and south wings are of similar depth to the six narrow bays on the Park Place and Barclay Street elevations but contain five bays. A small tower with three bays caps these wings.

==== Tower section ====
The 30th through 45th floors contain three bays on each elevation; the side bays contain two windows, while the center bay contains three windows. The 46th through 53rd floors also have three bays on each elevation, but the side bays only contain one window. At the 45th- and 50th-story setbacks, there are turrets at each corner of the tower. The northeast corner turret concealed a smokestack.

There is a pyramidal roof above the 53rd floor, as well as four ornamental tourelles at the four corners of the tower. The roof was originally gilt but is now green. The pyramidal roof, as well as the smaller roofs below, used 40,000 square feet (3,700 m^{2}) of gold leaf. The main roof is interspersed with small dormers, which contain windows into the maintenance levels inside. The pyramidal roof is topped by another pyramid with an octagonal base and tall pointed-arch windows. In turn, the octagonal pyramid is capped by a spire. The three layers of pyramids are about 62 feet (19 m), or five stories tall. An observation deck was located at the 55th floor, about 730 feet (220 m) above ground level. The deck was octagonal in plan, measuring 65 feet (20 m) across, was accessed by a glass-walled elevator. It was patronized by an estimated 300,000 visitors per year but was closed as a security measure in 1941 after the Pearl Harbor attack.

Strongly articulated piers, which carry right to the pyramidal cap without intermediate cornices, give the building its upward thrust. This was influenced by Aus's belief that, "From an engineering point of view, no structure is beautiful where the lines of strength are not apparent." The copper roof is connected to the Woolworth Building's steel superstructure, which serves to ground the roof electrically. The Gothic detailing concentrated at the highly visible crown is over-scaled, and the building's silhouette could be made out from several miles away. Gilbert's choice of the Gothic style was described as "an expression of the verticality of the tower form", and as Gilbert himself later wrote, the style was "light, graceful, delicate and flame-like". Gilbert considered several proposals for exterior lighting, including four powerful searchlights atop nearby buildings and a constantly rotating lamp at the apex of the Woolworth Building's roof. Ultimately, the builders decided to erect nitrogen lamps and reflectors above the 31st floor, and have the intensity of the lighting increase with height.

=== Structural features ===
==== Substructure ====
In contrast to other parts of Manhattan, the bedrock beneath the site is relatively deep, descending to between 110 and 115 feet (34 and 35 m) on average. The site also has a high water table, which is as shallow as 15 feet (4.6 m) beneath ground level. Due to the geology of the area, the building is supported on either 66 or 69 massive caissons that descend to the bedrock. The caissons range in depth from 100 to 120 feet (30 to 37 m).

To give the structure a sturdy foundation, the builders used metal tubes 19 feet (5.8 m) in diameter filled with concrete. These tubes were driven into the ground with a pneumatic caisson process to anchor the foundations to the bedrock. Because the slope of the bedrock was so sharp, steps had to be carved into the rock before the caissons could be sunk into the ground. The caissons were both round and rectangular, with the rectangular caissons located mainly on the southern and western lot lines. The caissons are irregularly distributed across the site, being more densely concentrated at the northeastern corner. This is because the building was originally planned to occupy a smaller site at the corner of Broadway and Park Place; when the site was enlarged, the caissons that had already been installed were left in place. The two basement levels, descending 55 feet (17 m), are constructed of reinforced concrete.

==== Superstructure ====
Whereas many earlier buildings had been constructed with load-bearing walls, which by necessity were extremely thick, the Woolworth Building's steel superstructure was relatively thin, which enabled Gilbert to maximize the building's interior area. Engineers Gunvald Aus and Kort Berle designed the steel frame. Each column carries a load of 24 short tons per square foot (2.3 MPa), supporting the building's overall weight of 233,000 short tons (208,000 long tons). Where the columns of the superstructure did not match up with the caissons, they were cantilevered above on plate girders between two adjoining caissons. These girders are extremely large; one such girder measures 8 feet (2.4 m) deep, 6.75 feet (2 m) wide, and 23 feet (7.0 m) long.

For the wind bracing, the entire Woolworth Building was considered as a vertical cantilever, and correspondingly large girders and columns were used in the construction. Continuous portal bracing was used between the 1st and 28th floors, except in the interior columns, where triangular bracing was used. The portal braces on the building's exterior direct crosswinds downward toward the ground, rather than into the building. Interconnecting trusses were placed at five-floor intervals between the tower and the wings; these, as well as the side and court walls, provided the bracing for the wings. Directly above each of the tower's setbacks, the outer walls are supported by girders, as the columns beneath them are offset. Above the 28th floor, knee braces and column-girder connections were used; hollow-tile floors were installed because it would have taken too long to set the concrete floors, especially during cold weather.

=== Interior ===
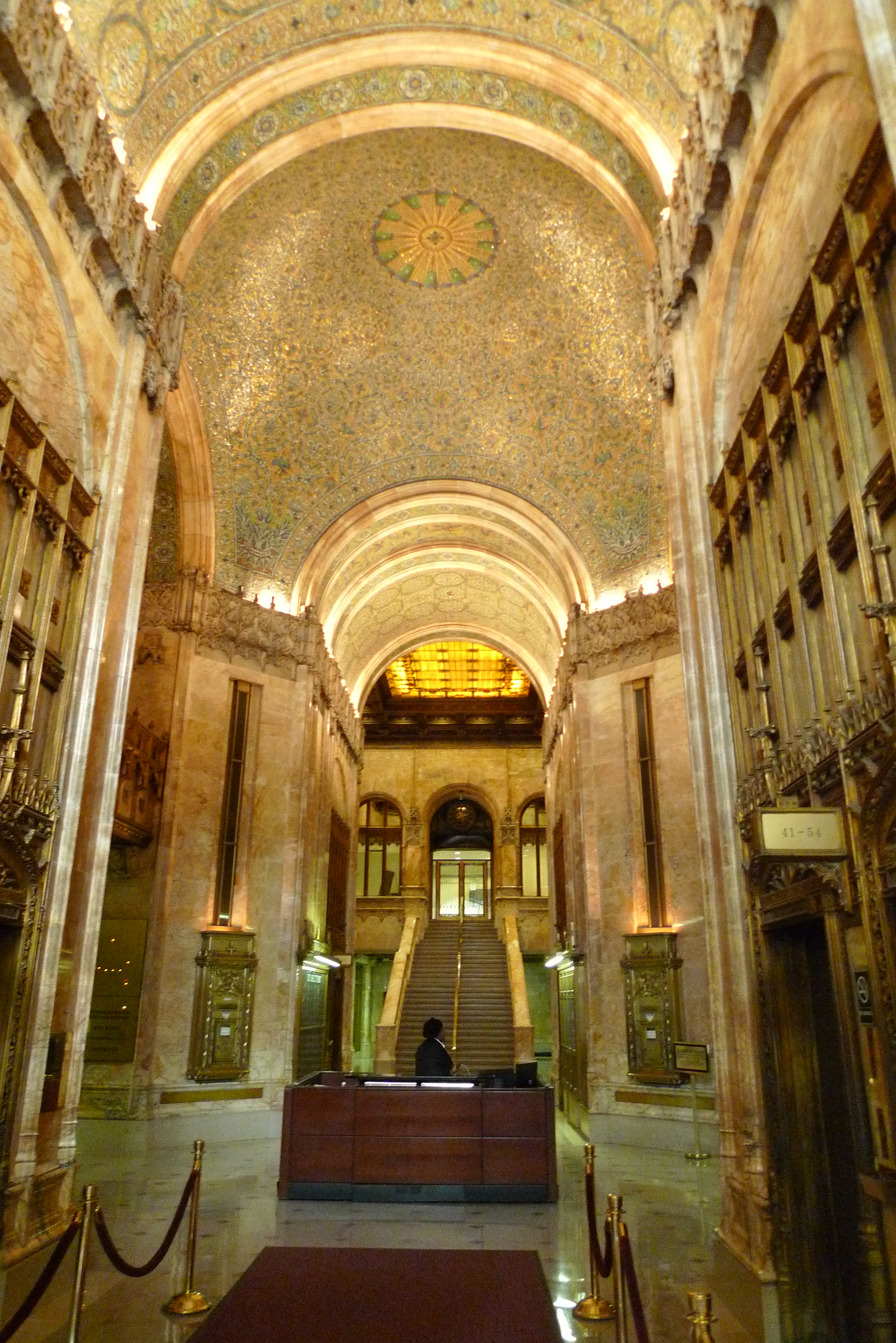
Part of the lobby

Upon completion, the Woolworth Building contained seven water systems—one each for the power plant, the hot-water plant, the fire-protection system, the communal restrooms, the offices with restrooms, the basement swimming pool, and the basement restaurant. There are water tanks on the 14th, 27th, 28th, 50th, and 53rd floors. Although the water is obtained from the New York City water supply system, much of it is filtered and reused. A dedicated water system, separate from the city's, was proposed during construction, but workers abandoned the plan after unsuccessfully digging 1,500 feet (460 m) into Manhattan's bedrock.

The Woolworth Building was the first structure to have its own power plant with four Corliss steam engine generators totaling a capacity of 1,500 kilowatt-hours (5.4×10^{12} mJ); the plant could support 50,000 people. The building also had a dedicated heating plant with six boilers with a capacity of 2,500 horsepower (1,900 kW). The boilers were fed from subterranean coal bunkers capable of holding over 2,000 tons of anthracite coal.

==== Lobby ====
The ornate, cruciform lobby, known as the "arcade", was characterized by the New York City Landmarks Preservation Commission (LPC) as "one of the most spectacular of the early 20th century in New York City". It consists of two perpendicular, double-height passageways with barrel-vaulted ceilings. One passageway runs between the arcade's west wing at the Woolworth Building's "staircase hall" and the east wing at Broadway. The other runs between the north wing at Park Place and the south wing at Barclay Street. A mezzanine crosses the arcade's north and south wings. Where the passageways intersect, there is a domed ceiling. The dome contains pendentives that may have been patterned after those of the Mausoleum of Galla Placidia. The walls of this intersection vault are laid out in an octagonal shape, with mailboxes at the four intercardinal directions.

Detail of grotesque

Veined marble from the island of Skyros in Greece covers the lobby. Edward F. Caldwell & Co. provided the interior lights for the lobby and hallways. Patterned glass mosaics that contain blue, green, and gold tiling with red accents decorate the ceilings. There are other Gothic-style decorations in the lobby, including on the cornice and the bronze fittings. Twelve plaster brackets, which carry grotesques depicting major figures in the building's construction, are placed where the arcade and the mezzanine intersect. These ornaments include Gilbert with a model of the building, Aus taking a girder's measurements, and Woolworth holding nickels and dimes. Two ceiling murals by C. Paul Jennewein, titled Labor and Commerce, are located above the mezzanine where it crosses the south and north wings, respectively.

The staircase hall is a two-story room located to the west of the arcade. It consists of the ground level, which contains former storefronts, as well as a mezzanine level above it. The ground floor originally contained 18 storefronts. A 15-foot-wide (4.6 m) marble staircase leads westward from the arcade to a mezzanine, where the entrance to the Irving National Exchange Bank office was formerly located. The mezzanine contains a stained-glass skylight surrounded by the names of several nations. The skylight contains the dates 1879 and 1913, which respectively signify the years of the Woolworth Company's founding and the building's opening. The skylight is also surrounded by sculpted grotesques, which depict merchandising activities in the five-and-dime industry. Heinigke and Brown manufactured the leaded glass of the mezzanine ceiling, as well as the barrel vault of the lobby.

There is a smaller space west of the staircase hall with a one-story-high ceiling. This room contains a coffered ceiling with a blue-green background. The crossbeams contain Roman portrait heads, while the cornice contains generic sculpted grotesques. The lobby also contains a set of German chimes designed by Harry Yerkes.

==== Basement ====
The basement of the Woolworth Building contains an unused bank vault, restaurant, and barbershop. The bank vault was initially intended to be used for safe-deposit boxes, though it was used by the Irving National Exchange Bank in practice. In 1931, Irving moved some $3 billion of deposits to a vault in its new headquarters at 1 Wall Street, and the Woolworth Building's vault was converted into a storage area for maintenance workers. There is also a basement storage room, known as the "bone yard", which contains replacement terracotta decorations for the facade.

The basement also contains closed entrances to two New York City Subway stations. There was an entrance to the Park Place station directly adjacent to the building's north elevation, served by the 2 and 3 trains. This entrance was closed after the September 11 attacks in 2001. Another entrance led to the City Hall station one block north, now served by the R and W trains, but this was closed in 1982 because of concerns over crime. The area in front of the former entrances was used as a bike-storage area by the 2010s.

A private pool, originally intended for F. W. Woolworth, exists in the basement. Proposed as early as 1910, the pool measured 15 by 55 feet (4.6 by 16.8 m) and had a marble perimeter. The pool was later drained but was restored in the mid-2010s as part of the conversion of the Woolworth Building's upper floors into residential units.

==== Offices ====
At the time of construction, the Woolworth Building had over 2,000 offices. Each office had ceilings ranging from 11 to 20 feet (3.4 to 6.1 m) high. Gilbert had designed the interior to maximize the amount of usable office space, and correspondingly, minimize the amount of space taken up by the elevator shafts. The usable-space consideration affected the placement of the columns in the wings, as the columns in the main tower were positioned around the elevator shafts and facade piers. Each of the lowest 30 stories had 31 offices, of which ten faced the light court, eight faced Park Place, eight faced Barclay Street, and five faced Broadway. Above the 30th-story setback, each story had 14 offices. For reasons that are unknown, floor numbers 42, 48, and 52 are skipped.

Woolworth's private office on the 24th floor, revetted in green marble in the French Empire style, is preserved in its original condition. His office included a mahogany desk with a leather top measuring 7.5 by 3.75 feet (2.29 by 1.14 m). That desk contained a hidden console with four buttons to request various members of his staff. The marble columns in the office are capped by gilded Corinthian capitals. Woolworth's reception room contained objects that were inspired by a visit to the Château de Compiègne shortly after the building opened. These included a bronze bust of Napoleon, a set of French Empire-style lamps with gold figures, and an inkwell with a depiction of Napoleon on horseback. The walls of the office contained portraits of Napoleon, and gold-and-scarlet chairs were arranged around the room. At some point, Woolworth replaced the portrait of Napoleon with a portrait of himself.

==== Elevators ====
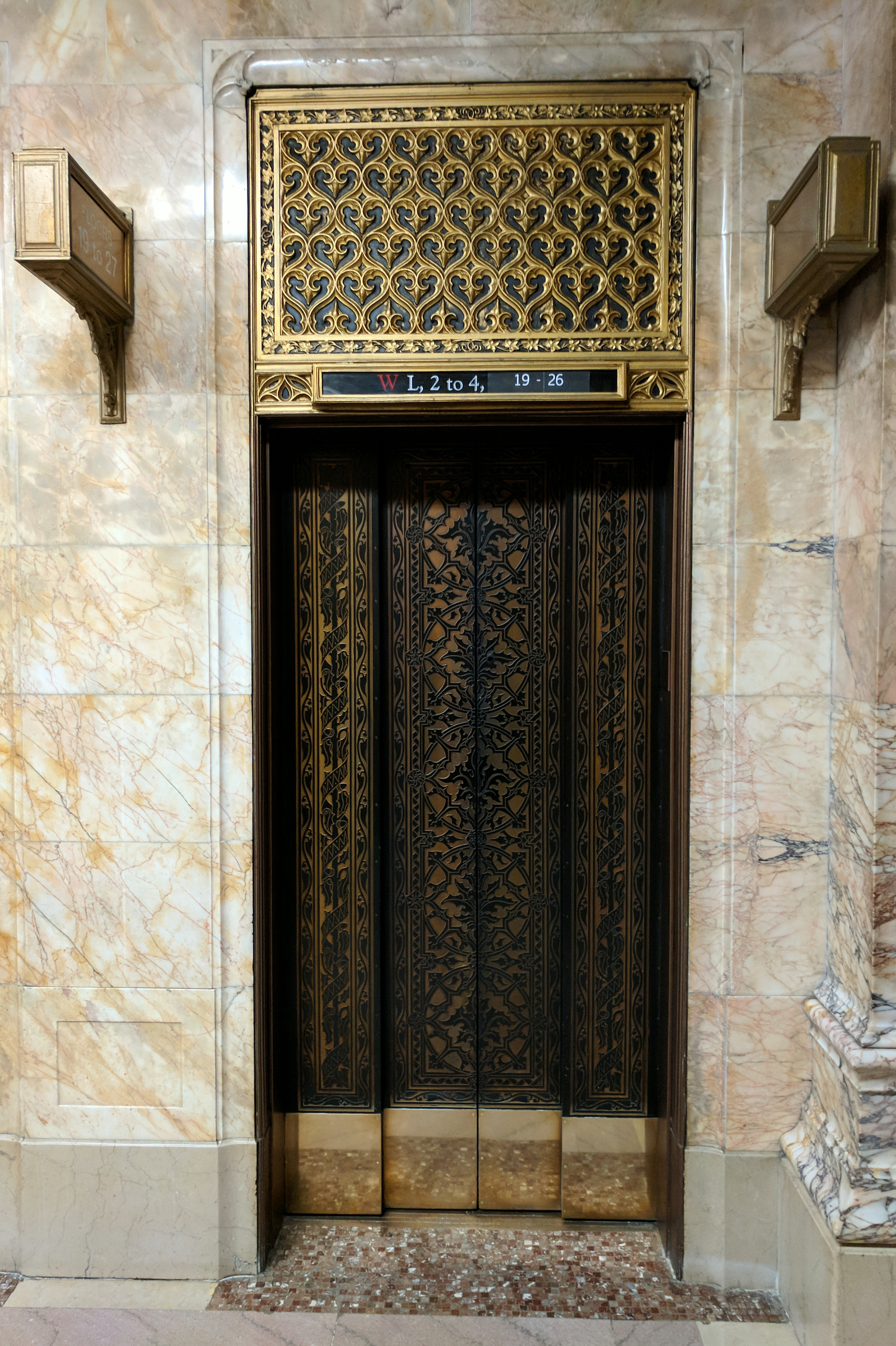
Detail of elevators

The Woolworth Building contains a system of high-speed elevators capable of traveling 650 feet (200 m) or 700 feet (210 m) per minute. The Otis Elevator Company supplied the units, which consisted of express elevators that ran nonstop between selected floors, as well as local elevators that stopped at every floor between a certain range. There were 26 Otis electric elevators with gearless traction, as well as an electric-drum shuttle elevator within the tower once construction was complete. Of these, 24 were passenger elevators, which were arranged around cruciform elevator lobbies on each floor. Two freight elevators and two emergency staircases were placed at the rear of the building.

The elevators are accessed from bays in the eastern and western walls of the arcade. The walls are both divided by two bays with round arches, and there are four elevators on each wall. The elevator doors in the lobby were designed by Tiffany Studios. The patterns on the doors have been described as "arabesque tracery patterns in etched steel set off against a gold-plated background".

== History ==
=== Planning ===
The entrepreneur F. W. Woolworth was born and raised in Jefferson County, New York. He first came to New York City in 1886 and became successful because of his "Five-and-Dime" (5- and 10-cent stores). He began planning a new headquarters for the F. W. Woolworth Company in 1910. Around the same time, Woolworth's friend Lewis Pierson was having difficulty getting shareholder approval for the merger of his Irving National Bank and the rival New York Exchange Bank. Woolworth, who was looking for funding, mentioned his plans for the building at a lunch with Pierson. Woolworth offered to acquire shares in New York Exchange Bank and vote in favor of the merger if Pierson agreed to move the combined banks' headquarters to the F. W. Woolworth Company's new headquarters.

Having received a commitment from the banks, Woolworth acquired a site at the corner of Broadway and Park Place in Lower Manhattan, opposite City Hall. Woolworth briefly considered purchasing a plot at West Broadway and Reade Street several blocks north. He decided against it because of the prestige that a Broadway address provided; despite its name, West Broadway is a separate street from Broadway.

Woolworth and the Irving National Exchange Bank then set up the Broadway–Park Place Company to construct and finance the proposed structure. Initially, the bank was supposed to purchase the company's stock gradually until it owned the entire company, and thus, the Woolworth Building. Irving would be able to manage the 18 floors on a 25-year lease. In addition, Irving would be able to control two of the Broadway–Park Place Company's seats, while Woolworth would control the other three seats and serve as that firm's president. While negotiations to create the Broadway-Park Place Company were ongoing, Woolworth and his real estate agent Edward J. Hogan purchased several parcels from the Trenor Luther Park estate and other owners. The entire footprint of the current building, a rectangular lot, had been acquired by April 15, 1910, at a total cost of $1.65 million (about $41.2 million in 2025).

==== Original designs ====
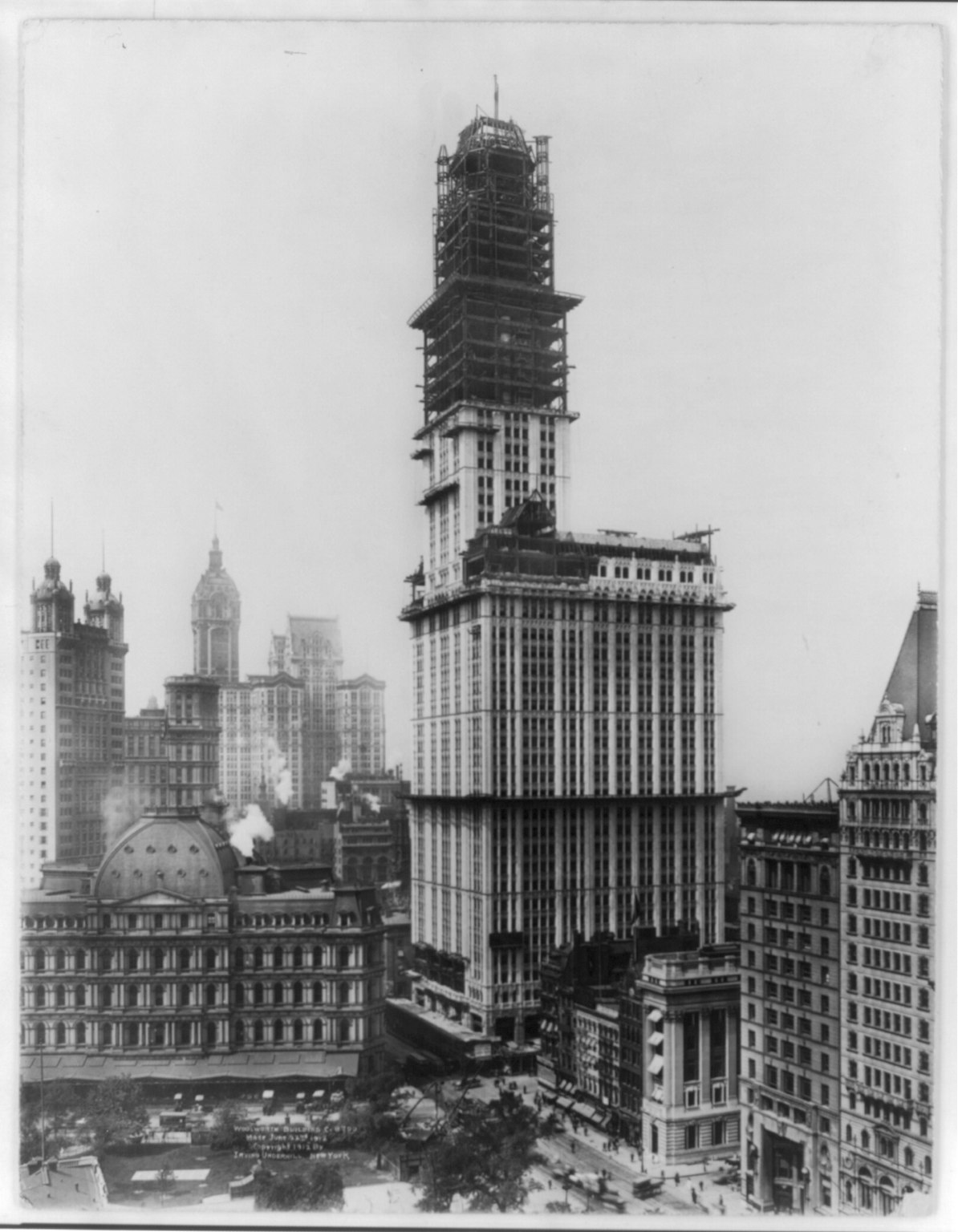
The Woolworth Building under construction on June 22, 1912

Woolworth commissioned Cass Gilbert to design the new building. There are few print documents that indicate early correspondence between Woolworth and Gilbert, and news articles as late as March 1910 mentioned that no architect had been chosen. Gilbert later mentioned that he had received the commission for the Woolworth Building after getting a phone call from Woolworth one day. The architect had recently finished designing the nearby Broadway–Chambers Building and 90 West Street, whose architecture Woolworth admired. Woolworth wanted his new structure to be of similar design to the Palace of Westminster in London, which was designed in the Gothic style. At the time, Gilbert was well known for constructing modern skyscrapers with historicizing design elements.

Gilbert was originally retained to design a standard 12- to 16-story commercial building for Woolworth, who later said he "had no desire to erect a monument that would cause posterity to remember me". By 1910, the plans called for a building with a 20-story base and 10-story upper section. Woolworth then wanted to surpass the nearby New York World Building, which sat on the other side of City Hall Park and stood 20 stories and 350 feet (110 m). A drawing by Thomas R. Johnson, dated April 22, 1910, shows a 30-story building rising from the site. Because of the change in plans, the organization of the Broadway-Park Place Company was rearranged. Woolworth would be the major investor in the Broadway–Park Place Company, contributing $1 million, and the bank would contribute the other $500,000. The Irving Bank would take up a 25-year lease for the ground floor, fourth floor, and basement.

By September 1910, Gilbert had designed an even taller structure, with a 40-story tower on Park Place adjacent to a shorter 25-story annex, yielding a 550-foot-tall (170 m) building. The next month, Gilbert's design had evolved into a 45-story building roughly the height of the nearby Singer Building. This proposal called for a neo-Gothic structure with a 26-story base, topped by a square tower rising another 19 stories. After the latest design, Woolworth wrote to Gilbert in November 1910 and asked for the building's height to be increased to 620 feet (190 m), which was 8 feet (2.4 m) taller than the Singer Building, Lower Manhattan's tallest building. Woolworth was inspired by his travels in Europe, where he would constantly be asked about the Singer Building. He decided that housing his company in an even taller building would provide invaluable advertising for the F. W. Woolworth Company and make it renowned worldwide. This design, unveiled to the public the same month, was a 45-story tower rising 625 feet (191 m), sitting on a lot by 105 by 197 feet (32 by 60 m). Referring to the revised plans, Woolworth said, "I do not want a mere building. I want something that will be an ornament to the city." He later said that he wanted visitors to brag that they had visited the world's tallest building. Louis J. Horowitz, president of the building's main contractor Thompson-Starrett Company, said of Woolworth, "Beyond a doubt his ego was a thing of extraordinary size; whoever tried to find a reason for his tall building and did not take that fact into account would reach a false conclusion."

==== Plans for world's tallest building ====
Even after the revised height was unveiled, Woolworth still yearned to make the building even taller as it was now close to the 700-foot (210 m) height of the Metropolitan Life Insurance Company Tower, then the tallest building in New York City and the world. On December 20, 1910, Woolworth sent a team of surveyors to measure the Metropolitan Life Tower's height and come up with a precise measurement, so he could make his skyscraper 50 feet (15 m) taller. He then ordered Gilbert to revise the building's design to reach 710 or 712 feet (216 or 217 m), despite ongoing worries over whether the additional height would be worth the increased cost. In order to fit the larger base that a taller tower necessitated, Woolworth bought the remainder of the frontage on Broadway between Park Place and Barclay Street. He also purchased two lots to the west, one on Park Place and one on Barclay Street; these lots would not be developed, but would retain their low-rise buildings and preserve the proposed tower's views. Such a tall building would produce the largest income of any building globally.

On January 1, 1911, the New York Times reported Woolworth was planning a 625 feet (191 m) building at a cost of $5 million. That month, Woolworth and Hogan acquired the final site for the project. In total, the site had cost $4.5 million (about $113 million in 2025) and measured 152 feet (46 m) on Broadway, 192.5 feet (58.7 m) on Barclay Street, and 197.83 feet (60 m) on Park Place. In a New York Times article two days later, Woolworth said that his building would rise 750 feet (230 m) to its tip. These plans called for a 30-story base and 25-story square tower above it. The 750-foot height was the absolute minimum that Woolworth would agree to, but Gilbert increased the height to 792-foot (241 m) so the architectural proportions would fit. Renderings by illustrator Hughson Hawley, completed in April 1911, are the first official materials that reflect this final height.

Gilbert had to reconcile both Woolworth's and Pierson's strict requirements for the design of the structure. The architect's notes describe late-night conversations that he had with both men. The current design of the lobby, with its arcade, reflected these conflicting pressures. Sometimes, Gilbert also faced practical conundrums, such as Woolworth's requirement that there be "many windows so divided that all of the offices should be well lighted", and so that tenants could erect partitions to fit their needs. Gilbert wrote this "naturally prevented any broad wall space". Woolworth commented at length on each of the dozens of drawings that Gilbert drew up. Woolworth and Gilbert sometimes clashed during the design process, especially because of the constantly changing designs and the architect's fees. Nevertheless, Gilbert commended Woolworth's devotion to the details and beauty of the building's design, as well as the entrepreneur's enthusiasm for the project. Such was the scale of the building that, for several years, Gilbert's sense of scale was "destroyed [...] because of the unprecedented attuning of detail to, for these days, such an excessive height".

=== Construction ===
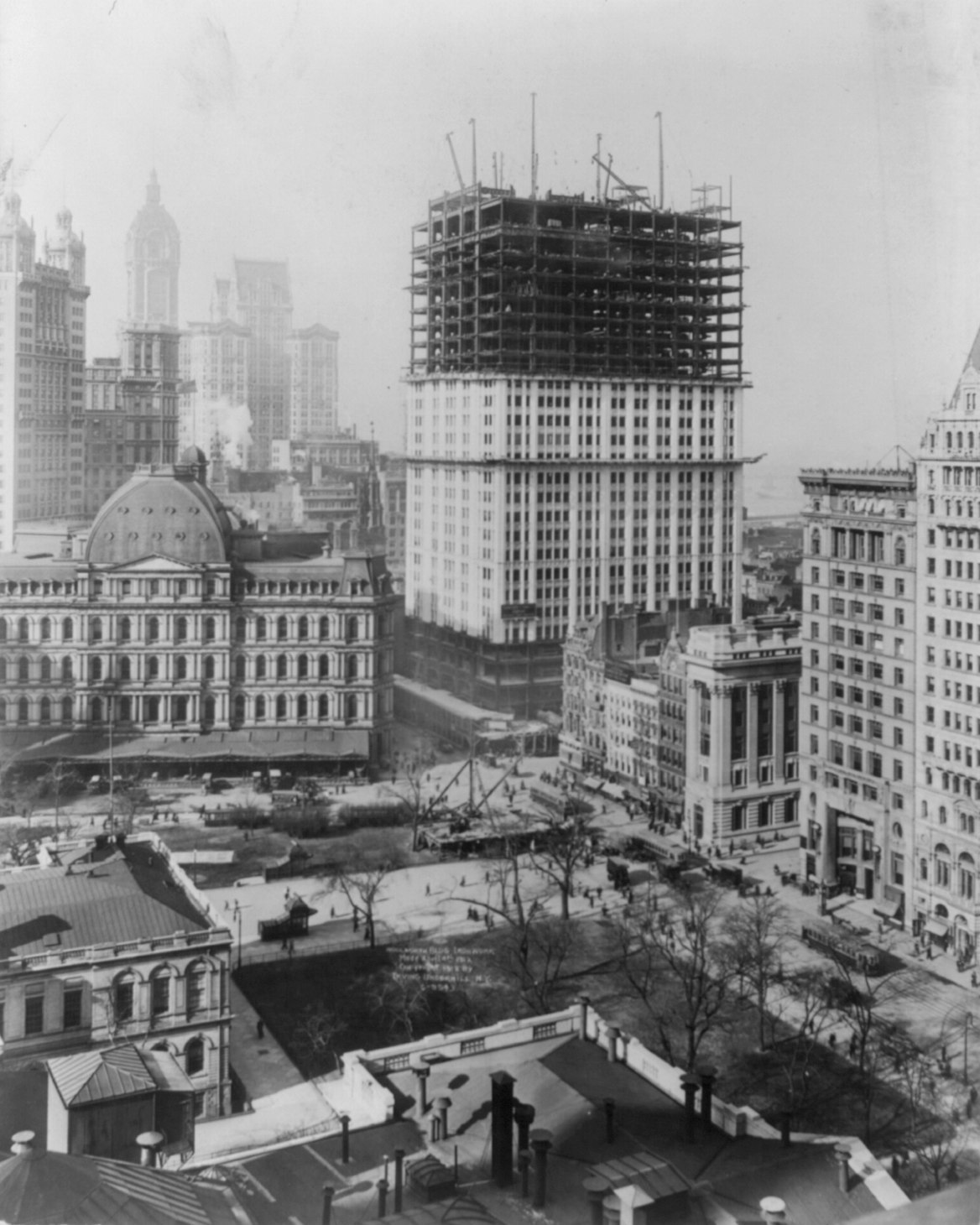
Photograph of the Woolworth Building under construction in April 1912

In September 1910, wrecking crews demolished the five-and-six-story structures which previously occupied the site. Construction officially began on November 4, 1910, with excavation by the Foundation Company, using a contract negotiated personally by Frank Woolworth. The start of construction instantly raised the site's value from $2.25 million to $3.2 million. The contract of over $1 million was described as the largest contract for foundation construction ever awarded in the world. It took months for Woolworth to decide upon the general construction company. George A. Fuller's Fuller Company was well experienced and had practically invented skyscraper construction, but Louis Horowitz's Thompson-Starrett Company was local to New York; despite being newer, Horowitz had worked for Fuller before, and thus had a similar knowledge base. On April 20, 1911, Thompson-Starrett won the contract with a guaranteed construction price of $4,308,500 for the building's frame and structural elements. The company was paid $300,000 for their oversight and management work, despite Woolworth's attempts to get the company to do the job for free due to the prestige of the project.

The first potential tenants began applying for space in the building in May 1911, before work had even started. On June 12, 1911, the Atlantic Terra Cotta Company received a $250,000 contract to manufacture the terracotta. The next month, Donnelly and Ricci received the $11,500 contract for the terracotta work and some of the interior design work. Gilbert requested Atlantic Terra Cotta use an office next to his while they drew several hundred designs. The construction process involved hundreds of workers, and daily wages ranged from $1.50 for laborers (equivalent to $49 in 2025) to $4.50 for skilled workers (equivalent to $147 in 2025). By August 1911, the building's foundations were completed ahead of the target date of September 15; construction of the skyscraper's steel frame began August 15. The steel beams and girders used in the framework weighed so much that, to prevent the streets from caving in, a group of surveyors examined them on the route along which the beams would be transported. The American Bridge Company provided steel for the building from their foundries in Philadelphia and Pittsburgh; manufacturing took over 45 weeks.

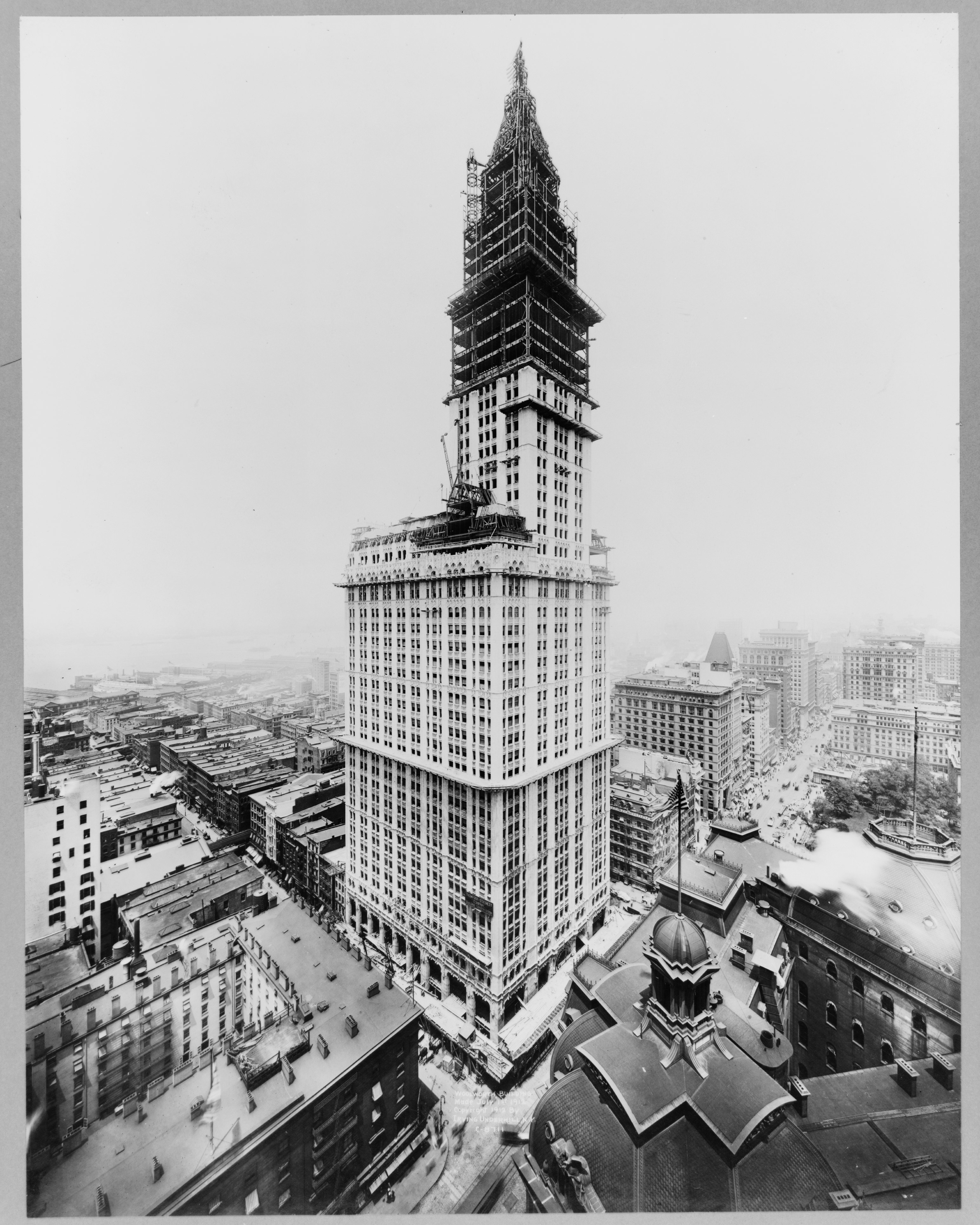
The Woolworth Building topped out on July 1, 1912

The first above-ground steel had been erected by October 1911, and installation of the building's terracotta began on February 1, 1912. The building rose at the rate of 1 1/2 stories a week and the steelworkers set a speed record for assembling 1,153 tons of steel in six consecutive eight-hour days. By February 18, 1912, work on the steel frame had reached the building's 18th floor. By April 6, 1912, the steel frame had reached the top of the base at the 30th floor and work then began on constructing the tower of the Woolworth Building. Steel reached the 47th floor by May 30 and the official topping out ceremony took place two weeks ahead of schedule on July 1, 1912, as the last rivet was driven into the summit of the tower. After the building was topped out, Gilbert initially told Woolworth that he thought the building was about 787 feet (240 m) tall, but Woolworth's own engineers found the true height to be 792 feet (241 m). The skyscraper was substantially completed by the end of 1912. The final estimated construction cost was US$13.5 million (equivalent to $440,000,000 in 2025), up from the initial estimates of US$5 million for the shorter versions of the skyscraper (equivalent to $163,000,000 in 2025). This was divided into $5 million for the land, $1 million for the foundation, and $7 million for the structure. Woolworth provided $5 million, while investors provided the remainder, and financing was completed by August 1911.

=== Woolworth operation ===
==== Opening and 1910s ====
The building opened on April 24, 1913. Woolworth held a grand dinner on the building's 27th floor for over 900 guests, and at exactly 7:30 p.m. EST, President Woodrow Wilson pushed a button in Washington, D.C., to turn on the building's lights. Attendees included: Francis Hopkinson Smith, who served as toastmaster; author William Winter; businessmen Patrick Francis Murphy and Charles M. Schwab; Rhode Island Governor Aram J. Pothier; Judge Thomas C. T. Crain; US Senator from Arkansas Joseph Taylor Robinson; Ecuadorian minister Gonzalo Córdova; New York Supreme Court Justices Charles L. Guy and Edward Everett McCall; Commissioner of Education of the State of New York John Huston Finley; Collector of the Port of New York William Loeb Jr.; naval architect Lewis Nixon; Rear Admiral Charles Dwight Sigsbee; Commissioner of Docks and Ferries of the City of New York R. A. C. Smith; Colonel William Conant Church; United States Representative from New York Herman A. Metz; New York City Police Commissioner Rhinelander Waldo; banker James Speyer; former Lieutenant Governor of New York Timothy L. Woodruff; writer Robert Sterling Yard; Admiral Albert Gleaves; and reportedly between 69 and 80 congressmen who arrived via a special train from Washington, DC. Additional congratulations were sent via letter from former President William Howard Taft, Governor of New Jersey James Fairman Fielder and United States Secretary of the Navy Josephus Daniels.

The building was declared ready for occupancy on May 1, 1913, and Woolworth began renting the offices at a minimum rate of $4 per square foot ($43/m^{2}), equivalent to $130 per square foot ($1,400/m^{2}) in 2025. To attract tenants, Woolworth hired architecture critic Montgomery Schuyler to write a 56-page brochure outlining the building's features. Schuyler later described the Woolworth Building as the "noblest offspring" of buildings erected with steel skeletons. On completion, the Woolworth Building topped the record set by the Metropolitan Life Insurance Company Tower as the world's tallest building, a distinction it held until 40 Wall Street opened in 1930. Woolworth had purchased all of the Broadway-Park Place Company's shares from the Irving National Exchange Bank by May 1914; his company held no ownership stake in the building. The bank, whose only involvement in the building was now as a tenant, agreed to lease the entire second story for $100,000 a year. The building contained offices for as many as 14,000 employees. By the end of 1914, the building was 70% occupied and generating over $1.3 million a year in rents for the F. W. Woolworth Company.

==== 1920s to 1960s ====
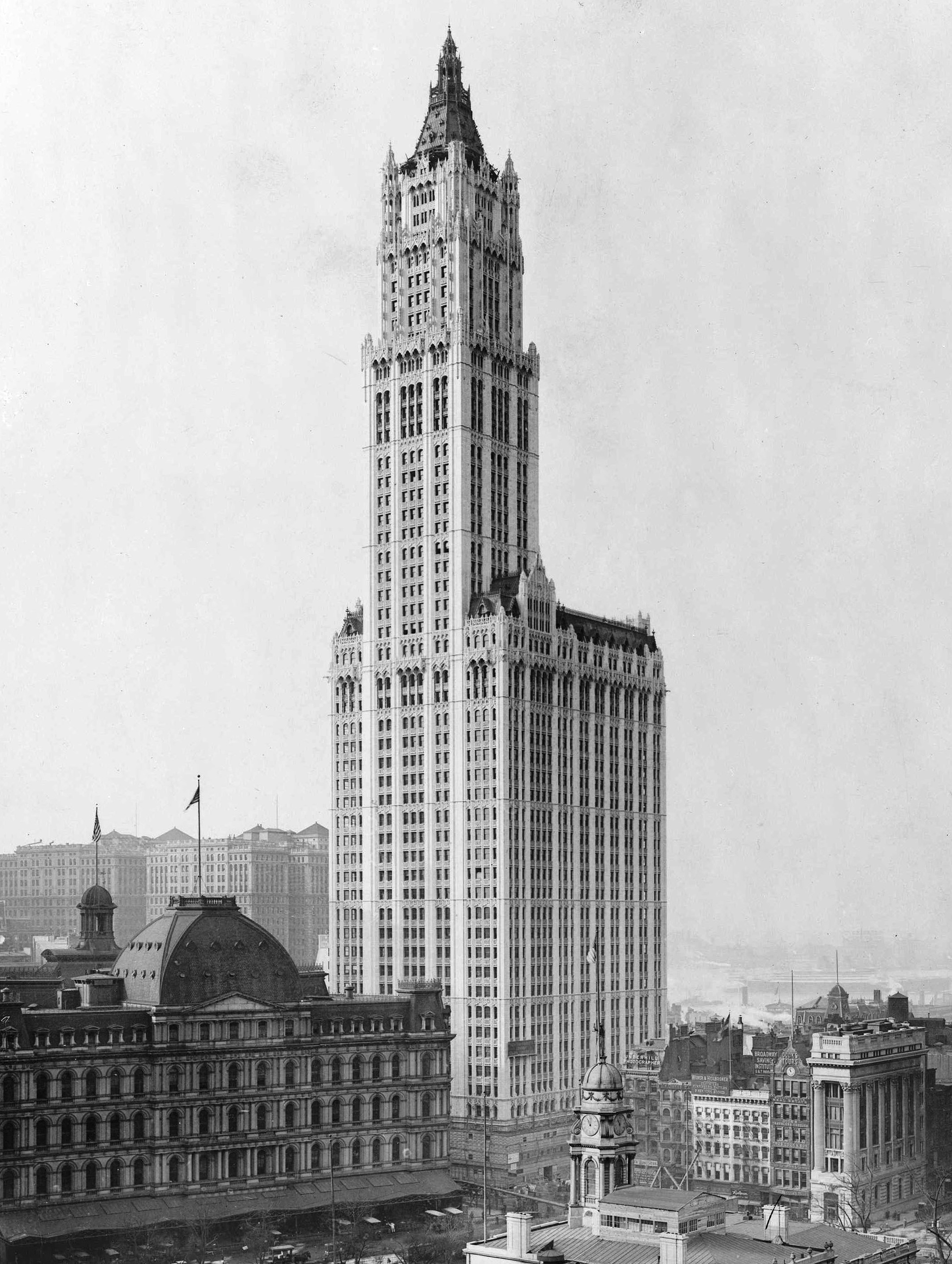
Woolworth Building c.1913

During World War I, only one of the Woolworth Building's then-14 elevators was turned on, and many lighting fixtures in hallways and offices were turned off. This resulted in about a 70% energy reduction compared to peacetime requirements. The building had more than a thousand tenants by the 1920s, who generally occupied suites of one or two rooms. These tenants reportedly collectively employed over 12,000 people in the building. In 1920, after F. W. Woolworth died, his heirs obtained a $3 million mortgage loan on the Woolworth Building from Prudential Life Insurance Company to pay off $8 million in inheritance tax. By this point, the building was worth $10 million and grossed $1.55 million per year in rent income. The Broadway-Park Place Corporation agreed to sell the building to Woolco Realty Co., a subsidiary of the F. W. Woolworth Company, in January 1924 at an assessed valuation of $11.25 million (about $167 million in 2025). The company paid $4 million in cash and obtained a five-year, $11 million mortgage from Prudential Life Insurance Company at an annual interest rate of 5.5%. The sale was finalized in April 1924, after which F. W. Woolworth's heirs no longer had any stake in the building.

In 1927, the building's pinnacle was painted green, and the observation tower was re-gilded for over $25,000 (about $372,344 in 2025). The Atlantic Terra Cotta Company cleaned the Woolworth Building's facade in 1932. Prudential extended its $3.7 million mortgage on the building by ten years in 1939, and the observation deck was closed after the bombing of Pearl Harbor in 1941. Ten of the building's 24 elevators were temporarily disabled in 1944 because of a shortage of coal. The next year, the building's owners replaced the elevators and closed off the building above the 54th story.

By 1953, a new chilled water air conditioning system had been installed, bringing individual room temperature control to a third of the building. The old car-switch-control elevators had been replaced with a new automatic dispatching systems and new elevator cars. The structure was still profitable by then, although it was now only the sixth-tallest building, and tourists no longer frequented the Woolworth Building. The building's terracotta facade deteriorated easily, and, by 1962, repairs to the terracotta tiles were occurring year-round. The Woolworth Company had considered selling the building as early as the 1960s, though the planned sale never happened.

==== Restoration and landmark status ====
The National Park Service designated the Woolworth Building as a National Historic Landmark in 1966. The New York City Landmarks Preservation Commission (LPC) considered giving the Woolworth Building official city-landmark status in 1970. The F. W. Woolworth Company called the landmark law "onerous" since it would restrict the company from making modifications to many aspects of the building. The commission ultimately declined to give the Woolworth Building a designated-landmark status because of the company's opposition to such a measure, as well as the increased costs and scrutiny. The lobby was cleaned in 1974.

The F. W. Woolworth Company commissioned an appraisal of the building's facade in 1975 and found serious deterioration in the building's terracotta. Many of the blocks of terracotta had loosened or cracked from the constant thermal expansion and contraction caused by New York's climate. The cracks in the facade had let rain in, which caused the steel superstructure to rust. By 1976, the Woolworth Company had placed metal netting around the facade to prevent terracotta pieces from dislodging and hitting pedestrians. The issues with the facade were exacerbated by the fact that very few terracotta manufacturers remained in business, making it difficult for the company to procure replacements. The New York City Industrial and Commercial Incentives Board approved a $8.5 million tax abatement in September 1977, which was to fund a proposed renovation of the Woolworth Building. The Woolworth Company still occupied half the building; its vice president for construction said "we think the building merits the investment", in part because F. W. Woolworth had used his own wealth to fund the building's construction. Much of the remaining space was occupied by lawyers who paid $7 to $12 per square foot ($75 to $129/m^{2}).

The F. W. Woolworth Company began a five-year restoration of the building's terracotta and limestone facade, as well as replacement of all the building's windows, in 1977. Initially, the company had considered replacing the entire terracotta facade with concrete; this was canceled due to its high cost and potential backlash from preservationists. The renovation, carried out by Turner Construction to plans by the New York architectural firm Ehrenkrantz Group, involved the replacement of roughly one-fifth of the building's terracotta. Since there were so few remaining terracotta manufacturers, so Woolworth's replaced 26,000 of the tiles with concrete lookalikes; many of those tiles had to be custom-cut. The concrete was coated with a surface that was meant to be replaced every five years, like the glazing on the terracotta blocks. Similarly, the original copper windows were replaced with aluminum frames. The company also removed some decorative flying buttresses near the tower's crown and refaced four tourelles in aluminum because of damage.

The building's renovation was completed without fanfare in 1982. The estimated cost of the project had risen from $8 million to over $22 million. Much of the renovation was financed through the city government's tax break, which had increased to $11.4 million. The LPC again considered the Woolworth Building for landmark designation in early 1982, shortly after the renovation was completed. Upon the request of the building's lawyers, the LPC postponed a public hearing for the proposed landmark designation to April 1982. That year, the building's entrance to the City Hall subway station was closed because of fears over crime. The LPC granted landmark protection to the building's facade and the interior of its lobby in April 1983. The Woolworth Company (later Venator Group) continued to own the building for a decade and a half. After struggling financially for years, and with no need for a trophy office building, Venator Group began discussing a sale of the building in 1996. To raise capital for its other operations, Venator formally placed the Woolworth Building for sale in April 1998.

=== Witkoff Group ownership ===
==== Sale and initial plan ====
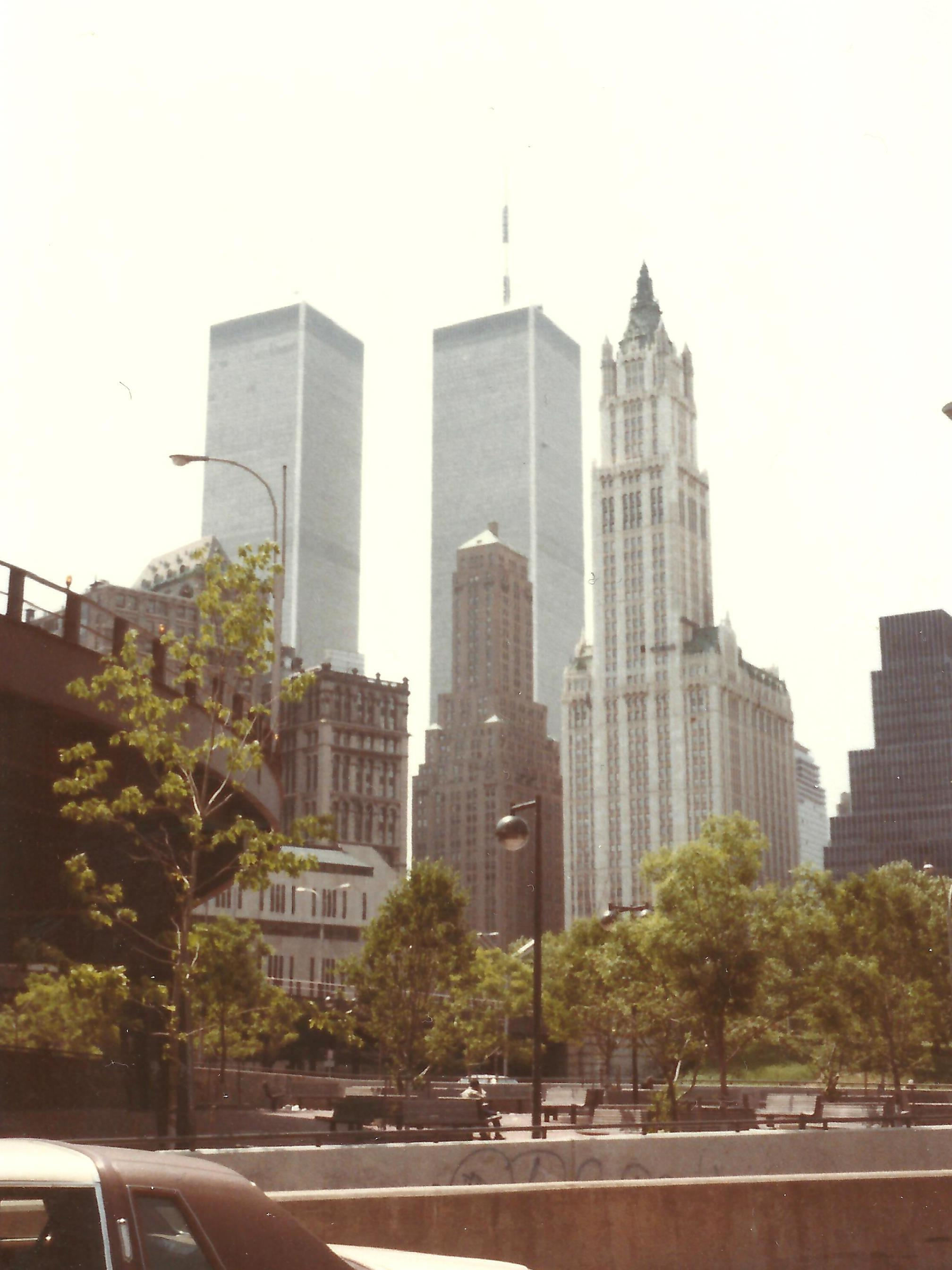
The Woolworth Building in 1985, right, the former World Trade Center in the background

Venator Group agreed to sell the building in June 1998 to Steve Witkoff's Witkoff Group and Lehman Brothers for $155 million (about $285 million in 2025). Before the sale was finalized in December 1998, Witkoff renegotiated the purchase price to $137.5 million (about $253 million in 2025), citing a declining debt market. Venator shrunk its space in the building from eight floors to four; this was a sharp contrast to the 25 floors the company had occupied just before the sale. Witkoff also agreed to license the Woolworth name and invest $30 million in renovating the exterior and interior of the building. After purchasing the building, the Witkoff Group rebranded it in an attempt to attract entertainment and technology companies. In April 2000, the Venator Group officially moved their headquarters to 112 West 34th Street, and Witkoff indicated that he would sell the upper half of the building as residential condominiums. That October, the company proposed a two-story addition to the 29th-floor setbacks on the north and south elevations of the tower, to be designed by Skidmore, Owings & Merrill, who were also leading the renovation of the building. The LPC denied the proposal.

The company unveiled an ambitious plan in November 2000 that would have converted the top 27 floors of the building into 75 condominiums, including a five-story penthouse. The plan would have included a new residential lobby on Park Place, a 100-space garage, a 75-seat underground screening room, and a spa in the basement. The developers planned to spend $60 to $70 million on the conversion and to be ready for occupancy by August 2002. The LPC opposed the plan because it would have required exterior changes to the roof. The commission eventually approved a modified version of the plan. Following the September 11 attacks, and the subsequent collapse of the nearby World Trade Center, the status of the plan was in doubt, and the proposal was later canceled.

==== Security increases and new plan ====
Prior to the September 11 attacks, the World Trade Center was often photographed in such a way that the Woolworth Building could be seen between the complex's twin towers. After the attacks occurred only a few blocks away, the Woolworth Building was without electricity, water and telephone service for a few weeks; its windows were broken, and falling rubble damaged a top turret. Increased post-attack security restricted access to most of the ornate lobby, previously a tourist attraction. New York Times reporter David W. Dunlap wrote in 2006 that a security guard had asked him to leave within twelve seconds of entering the Woolworth Building. However, there was renewed interest in restoring public access to the Woolworth Building during planning for its centennial celebrations. The lobby reopened to public tours in 2014, when Woolworth Tours started accommodating groups for 30- to 90-minute tours. The tours were part of a partnership between Cass Gilbert's great-granddaughter, Helen Post Curry, and Witkoff's vice president for development, Roy A. Suskin.

In June 2003, Credit Suisse First Boston provided $201 million in financing for the property spread across a $125.4 million senior loan, a $49.6 million junior interest and a $26 million mezzanine loan. In April 2005, Bank of America provided a $250 million (about $395 million in 2025) commercial mortgage-backed security interest-only loan on the office portion of the building. At the time, the building was 96% occupied, appraised at $320 million, and generated almost $18 million a year in net operating income.

By 2007, the concrete blocks on the Woolworth Building's facade had deteriorated because of neglect. A lack of regular re-surfacing had led to water and dirt absorption, which stained the concrete blocks. Though terracotta's popularity had increased since the 1970s, Suskin had declined to say whether the facade would be modified, if at all. Around the same time, Witkoff planned to partner with Rubin Schron to create an "office club" on the top 25 floors building to attract high-end tenants like hedge funds and private equity firms. The plan would have restored the 58th floor observatory as a private amenity for "office club" tenants, in addition to amenities like a private dining room, meeting rooms, and a new dedicated lobby. The partners planned to complete the project by the end of 2008, but the 2008 financial crisis derailed the plans, leaving the top floors gutted and vacant.

=== Mixed-use conversion ===
==== Sale and partial residential conversion ====
On July 31, 2012, an investment group led by New York developer Alchemy Properties which included Adam Neumann and Joel Schreiber, bought the top 30 floors of the skyscraper for $68 million (about $94.1 million in 2025) from the Witkoff Group and Cammeby's International. The firm planned to renovate the space into 33 luxury apartments and convert the penthouse into a five-level living space. The lower 28 floors are still owned by the Witkoff Group and Cammeby's International, who planned to maintain them as office space. The project was expected to cost approximately $150 million including the $68 million purchase price. The Landmarks Preservation Commission approved the changes to the building in October 2013.

When the sale was first announced in 2012, the developers expected the building's conversion to be complete by 2015. However, construction took longer than expected. Workers could not attach a construction hoist to the building's landmarked facade without damaging it, and they were prohibited from using the elevators because of the active office tenants on the lower floors and the regular public tours of the landmarked lobby. The renovation included many restorations and changes to the building's interior. Two of the elevator shafts only went to the 29th floor, allowing extra floor space for the residents above. A new private lobby was also built for residents and the coffered ceiling from F.W. Woolworth's personal 40th floor office was relocated to the entryway. Thierry Despont and Eve Robinson designed the building's new interiors with Miele appliances and custom cabinetry. Each unit also received space in a wine cellar, along with access to the restored private pool in the basement. The 29th floor was converted to an amenity floor named the "Gilbert Lounge" after the structure's architect, while the 30th floor hosts a fitness facility.

In August 2014, the New York Attorney General's office approved Alchemy's plan to sell 34 condos at the newly branded Woolworth Tower Residences for a combined total of $443.7 million. After a soft launch in late 2014, units at the building were officially listed for sale in mid-2015. Alchemy initially intended to leverage an in-house sales staff and hired a director from Corcoran Sunshine to lead the effort. However, the new sales director left at the end of 2015 for Extell Development Company amid rumors of slow sales at the project. Following his departure, the company hired Sotheby's International Realty to market the units. The building's penthouse unit, dubbed "The Pinnacle", was listed at $110 million, the highest asking price ever for an apartment in downtown Manhattan. If it had sold at that price, the unit would have surpassed the record $50.9 million penthouse at Ralph Thomas Walker's Walker Tower, and even the $100.5 million record price for a Manhattan penthouse set by Michael Dell at Extell's One57 in 2014; the penthouse ultimately sold for $30 million in 2023.

==== Post-conversion ====
In 2015, The Blackstone Group provided a $320 million loan on the office portion of the building to refinance the maturing Bank of America loan from 2005. United Overseas Bank of Singapore provided a $220 million (about $289 million in 2025) construction loan for the residential conversion in June 2016. Due to delays, the conversion was expected to be completed by February or March 2019, about six and a half years after Alchemy bought the property. By February 2019, only three of the building's 31 condos had been sold, since the developers had refused to discount prices, despite a glut of new luxury apartments in New York City. The still-vacant penthouse's asking price was reduced to $79 million.

By 2021, Alchemy had sold 22 condominiums to tenants such as entrepreneur Rudra Pandey. At the time, 84 companies occupied 92% of the building's office portion, of which four tenants occupied 40% of the building's entire floor area. The office stories were refinanced again in 2025 with a $279 million loan from Blackstone.

== Tenants ==
=== Early tenants ===
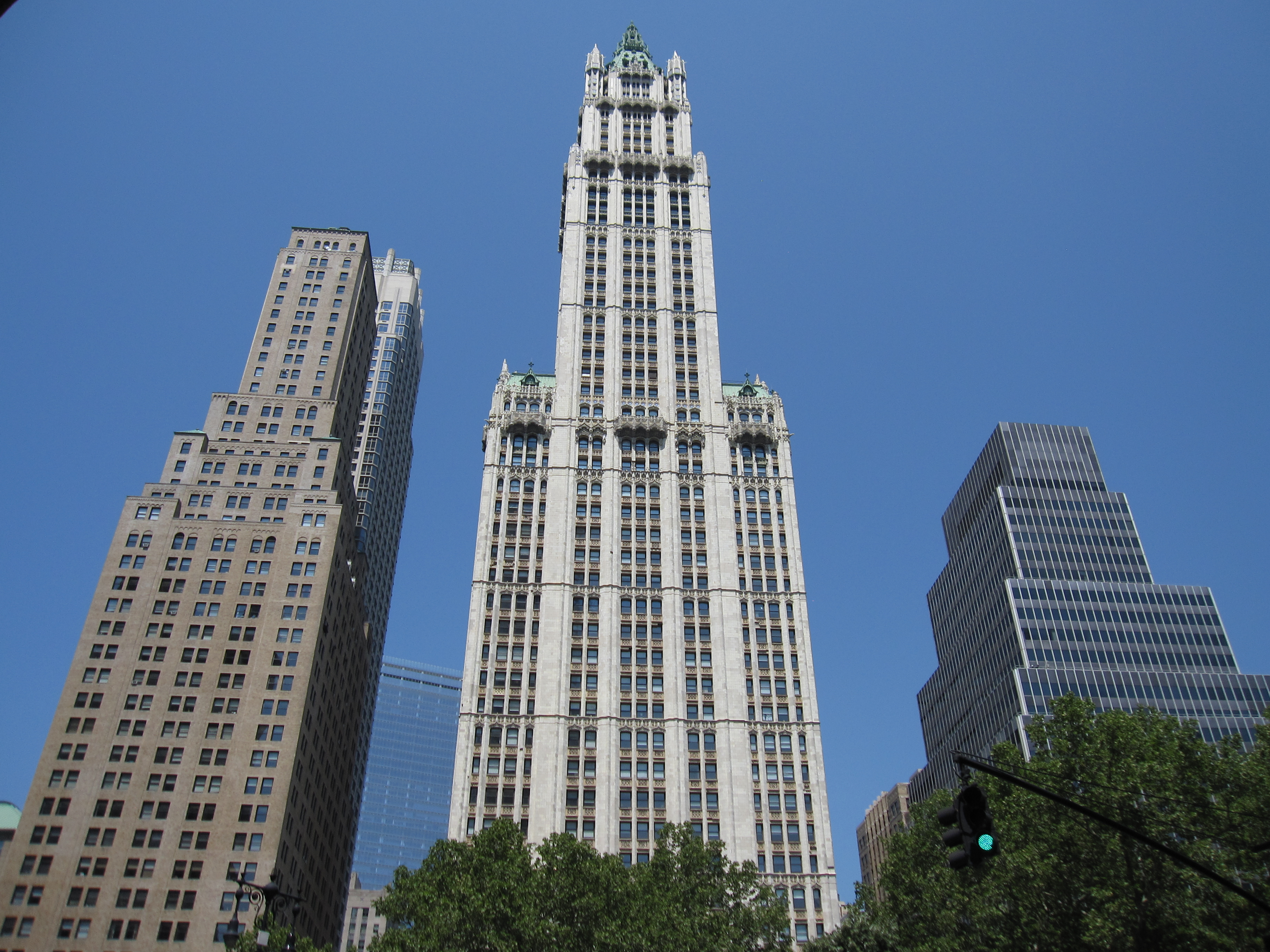
Seen from the east

On the building's completion, the F. W. Woolworth Company occupied only one and a half floors. However, as the owner, the Woolworth Company profited from renting space out to others. The Woolworth Building was almost always fully occupied because of its central location in Lower Manhattan, as well as its direct connections to two subway stations. The Irving Trust Company occupied the first four floors when the building opened. It had a large banking room on the second floor accessible directly from a grand staircase in the lobby, vaults in the basement, offices on the third-floor mezzanine, and a boardroom on the fourth floor. In 1931, the company relocated their general, out-of-town, and foreign offices from the Woolworth Building after building their own headquarters at 1 Wall Street. Columbia Records was one of the Woolworth Building's tenants on opening day and housed a recording studio in the skyscraper. In 1917, Columbia made what are considered the first jazz recordings, by the Original Dixieland Jass Band, in this studio.

Shortly after the building opened, several railroad companies rented space. The Union Pacific Railroad and Delaware, Lackawanna and Western Railroad occupied the ground floor retail space with ticket offices. Other railroad companies that leased office space included the Alton Railroad, on the 13th floor; the Chicago, Milwaukee, St. Paul and Pacific Railroad (Milwaukee Road), on the 14th floor; the Canadian Pacific Railway, Great Northern Railway, and New York Central Railroad on the 15th floor; the Chicago, Rock Island and Pacific Railroad, on the 17th floor; the Chicago and North Western Transportation Company, on the 19th floor; the Canadian Northern Railway; the Los Angeles and Salt Lake Railroad; the Pennsylvania Railroad; the Atlanta, Birmingham and Atlantic Railway; the Kansas City Southern Railway; and the Denver and Rio Grande Western Railroad.

The inventor Nikola Tesla also occupied an office in the Woolworth Building beginning in 1914; he was evicted after a year because he could not pay his rent. Scientific American moved into the building in 1915 before departing for Midtown Manhattan in 1926. The Marconi Wireless Telegraph Company of America was present at the building's opening, occupying the southern half of the 18th floor after signing a lease in January 1913. Other early tenants included the American Hardware Manufacturers Association headquarters, the American Association of Foreign Language Newspapers, Colt's Manufacturing Company, Remington Arms, Simmons-Boardman Publishing headquarters, the Taft-Peirce Manufacturing Company, and the Hudson Motor Car Company.

=== Later 20th century ===
By the 1920s, the building also hosted Newport News Shipbuilding and Nestlé. In the 1930s, prosecutor Thomas E. Dewey maintained his offices in the building while investigating racketeering and organized crime in Manhattan. His office took up the entire fourteenth floor and was heavily guarded. The regional headquarters of the National Labor Relations Board also moved into the building in 1937, shortly after its founding in 1935. During World War II, the Kellex Corporation, part of the Manhattan Project to develop nuclear weapons, was based here.

During the early 1960s, public relations expert Howard J. Rubenstein opened an office in the building. In 1975, the city signed a lease for state judge Jacob D. Fuchsberg's offices in the Woolworth Building.

=== Higher education ===
The structure has a long association with higher education, housing a number of Fordham University schools in the early 20th century. In 1916, Fordham created "Fordham Downtown" at the Woolworth Building by moving the School of Sociology and Social Service and the School of Law to the building. The Fordham University Graduate School was founded on the building's 28th floor in the same year and a new Teachers' College quickly followed on the seventh floor. In September 1920, the Business School was also established on the seventh floor, originally as the School of Accounting. By 1929, the school's combined programs at the Woolworth Building had over 3,000 enrolled students. Between 1916 and 1943 the building was also home at various times to the Fordham College (Manhattan Division), a summer school, and the short-lived School of Irish Studies. In 1943, the Graduate School relocated to Keating Hall at Fordham's Rose Hill campus in Fordham, Bronx, and the rest of the schools moved to nearby 302 Broadway because of reduced attendance because of World War II.

The New York University School of Professional Studies' Center for Global Affairs leased 94,000 square feet (8,700 m^{2}) on the second, third, and fourth floors in 2002 from defunct dot-com startup FrontLine Capital Group. The American Institute of Graphic Arts also moved its headquarters to the Woolworth Building.

=== 21st-century tenants ===
By the early 2000s, the Woolworth Building was home to numerous technology tenants. Digital advertising firm Xceed occupied 65,000 square feet (6,000 m^{2}) across four floors as its headquarters, Organic, Inc. took 112,000 square feet (10,400 m^{2}), and advertising agency Fallon Worldwide used two floors. Xceed terminated its lease in April 2001 during the midst of the Dot-com bubble collapse in order to move to smaller offices in the Starrett–Lehigh Building. One month after the U.S. Securities and Exchange Commission's (SEC) Northeast Regional Office at 7 World Trade Center was destroyed in the September 11 attacks, the commission's 334 employees moved into 140,000 square feet (13,000 m^{2}) across five floors of the Woolworth Building. The SEC left for a larger space in Brookfield Place in early 2005. The General Services Administration took over the commission's space on November 1, 2005 and used it as offices for approximately 200 staff of the Administrative Office of the United States Courts and U.S. Probation and Pretrial Services System. Following the completion of renovations at the historic Thurgood Marshall United States Courthouse in late October 2017, both offices moved into newly vacated space in the nearby Daniel Patrick Moynihan United States Courthouse.

The New York City Police Department pension fund signed a lease for 56,000 square feet (5,200 m^{2}) on the 19th and 25th floors in April 2002. The pension fund renewed their lease for another 20-year term in October 2010. Starbucks opened a 1,500-square-foot (140 m^{2}) location on the ground floor in the spring of 2003. In 2006, Levitz Furniture moved its headquarters to the 23rd floor from Woodbury, Long Island, after declaring bankruptcy a second time. The design firm Control Group Inc. leased an entire floor in 2006.

As of 2010, the Lawrence Group handles leasing at the Woolworth Building. In May 2013, SHoP Architects moved the company's headquarters to the entire 11th floor, occupying 30,500 square feet (2,830 m^{2}) of space. In February 2016, the New York City Law Department leased the entire 32,000 square feet (3,000 m^{2}) fifth floor for the Department's tort office. Joseph Altuzarra's namesake fashion brand, Altuzarra, signed on to occupy the 14th floor in June 2016. In November 2017, Thomas J. Watson's Watson Foundation signed a lease to relocate to the 27th floor. In 2017, the New York Shipping Exchange moved into the 21st floor. In May 2018, architecture and design firm CallisonRTKL signed a lease for the entire 28,100 square feet (2,610 m^{2}) 16th floor. The Vera Institute of Justice left the building's 12th floor a few months later for a larger space in Industry City, Brooklyn. As of 2021, NYU was the building's largest tenant, followed by the government of New York City, the NYPD Pension Fund, and SHoP Architects.

== Impact ==
=== Reception and design influence ===
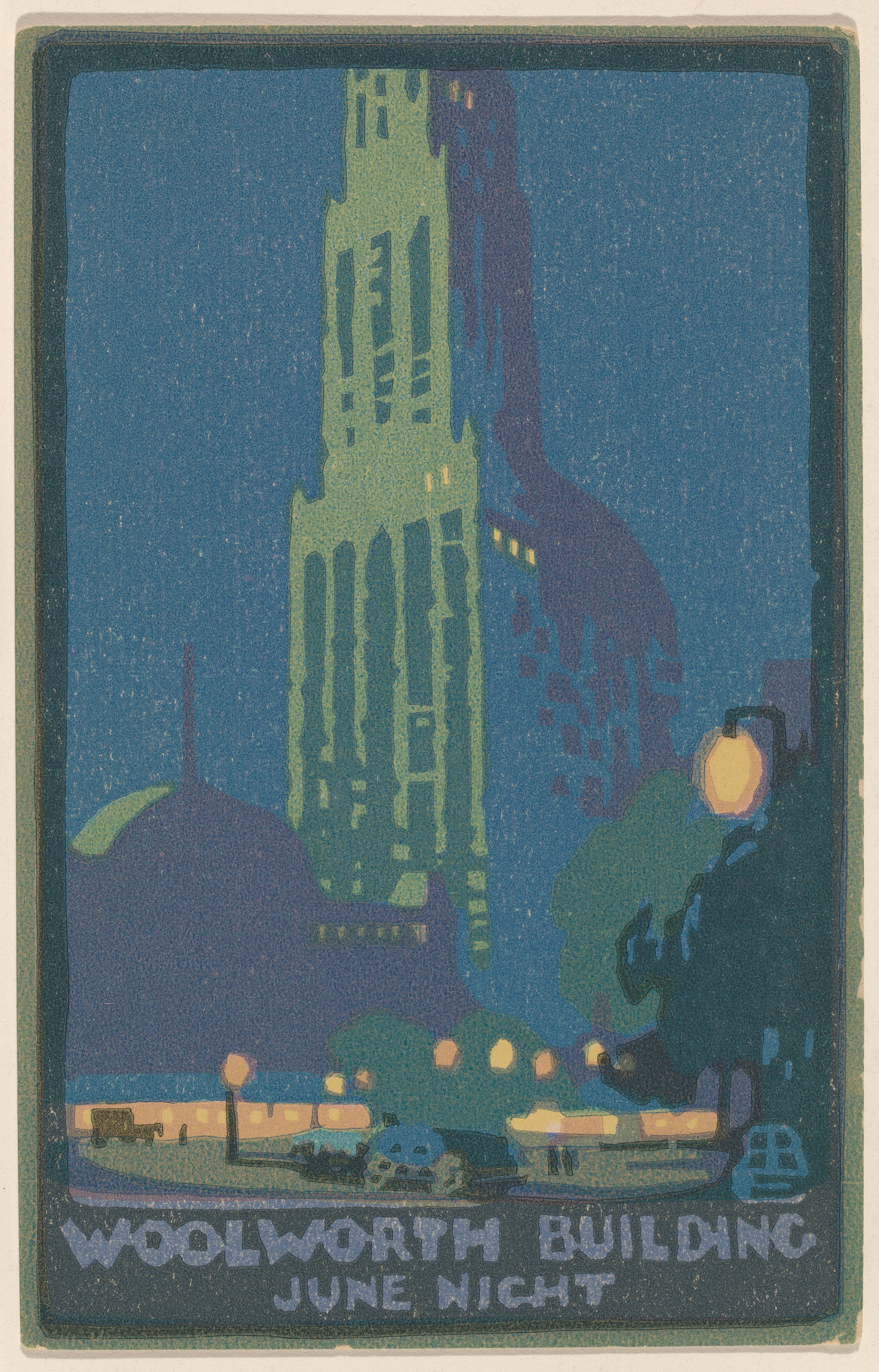
Woolworth Building June Night, 1916 lithograph by Rachael Robinson Elmer, National Gallery of Art

Before construction, Woolworth hired New York photographer Irving Underhill to document the building's construction. These photographs were distributed to Woolworth's stores nationwide to generate enthusiasm for the project. During construction, Underhill, Wurts Brothers, and Tebbs-Hymans each took photographs to document the structure's progression. These photos were often taken from close-up views, or from far away to provide contrast against the surrounding structures. They were part of a media promotion for the Woolworth Building. Both contemporary and modern figures criticized the photos as "'standard solutions' at best and 'architectural eye candy' at worst".

Later critics praised the building. Amei Wallach of Newsday wrote in 1978 that the building resembled "a giant cathedral absurdly stretched in a gigantic fun mirror" and that the lobby "certainly looks like a farmboy's dream of glory". A writer for The Baltimore Sun wrote in 1984 that the lobby's lighting, ceiling mosaic, and gold-leaf decorations "combine for a church-like atmosphere", yet the grotesques provided a "touch of irreverence". Richard Berenholtz wrote in his 1988 book Manhattan Architecture that, at the Woolworth Building, Gilbert "succeeded in uniting the respected traditions of architecture and decoration with modern technology". In a 2001 book about Cass Gilbert, Mary N. Woods wrote that "the rich and varied afterlife of the Woolworth Building ... enhances [Gilbert's] accomplishment". Dirk Stichweh described the building in 2005 as being "the Mozart of skyscrapers". In 2007, the building ranked 44th among 150 buildings in the AIA's List of America's Favorite Architecture.

In recognition of Gilbert's role as the building's architect, the Society of Arts and Sciences gave Gilbert its gold medal in 1930, calling it an "epochal landmark in the history of architecture". On the 40th anniversary of the building's opening in 1953, one news source called the building "a substantial middle-aged lady, with a good income, unconcern over years—and lots of friends". A one-third-scale replica of the Woolworth Building, the Lincoln American Tower in Memphis, Tennessee, was also built in 1924.

=== Media ===
The Woolworth Building has had a large impact in architectural spheres, and has been featured in many works of popular culture, including photographs, prints, films, and literature. One of the earliest films to feature the skyscraper was Manhatta (1921), a short documentary film directed by painter Charles Sheeler and photographer Paul Strand. Since then, the building has made cameo appearances in several films, such as the 1929 film Applause. It was also the setting of several film climaxes, such as in Enchanted (2007), as well as the setting of major organizations, such as in Fantastic Beasts and Where to Find Them (2016). The television show Ugly Betty used the Woolworth Building as the 'Meade Publications' building, a major location in the series, while one of the vacant condominiums was used in filming the TV series Succession in 2021. The building has also appeared in literature, such as Langston Hughes's 1926 poem "Negro" and the 2007 novel Peak.

== See also ==
- Early skyscrapers
- History of the world's tallest buildings
- List of Woolworth buildings
- List of tallest buildings in the United States
- List of National Historic Landmarks in New York City
- List of New York City Designated Landmarks in Manhattan below 14th Street
- National Register of Historic Places listings in Manhattan below 14th Street

Records
Preceded by Metropolitan Life Insurance Company Tower	Tallest building in the world 1913–1929	Succeeded by 40 Wall Street
Preceded by Metropolitan Life Insurance Company Tower	Tallest building in the United States; 1913–1929	Succeeded by 40 Wall Street
