= Rudra Pandey =

Nepali entrepreneur (born 1963)

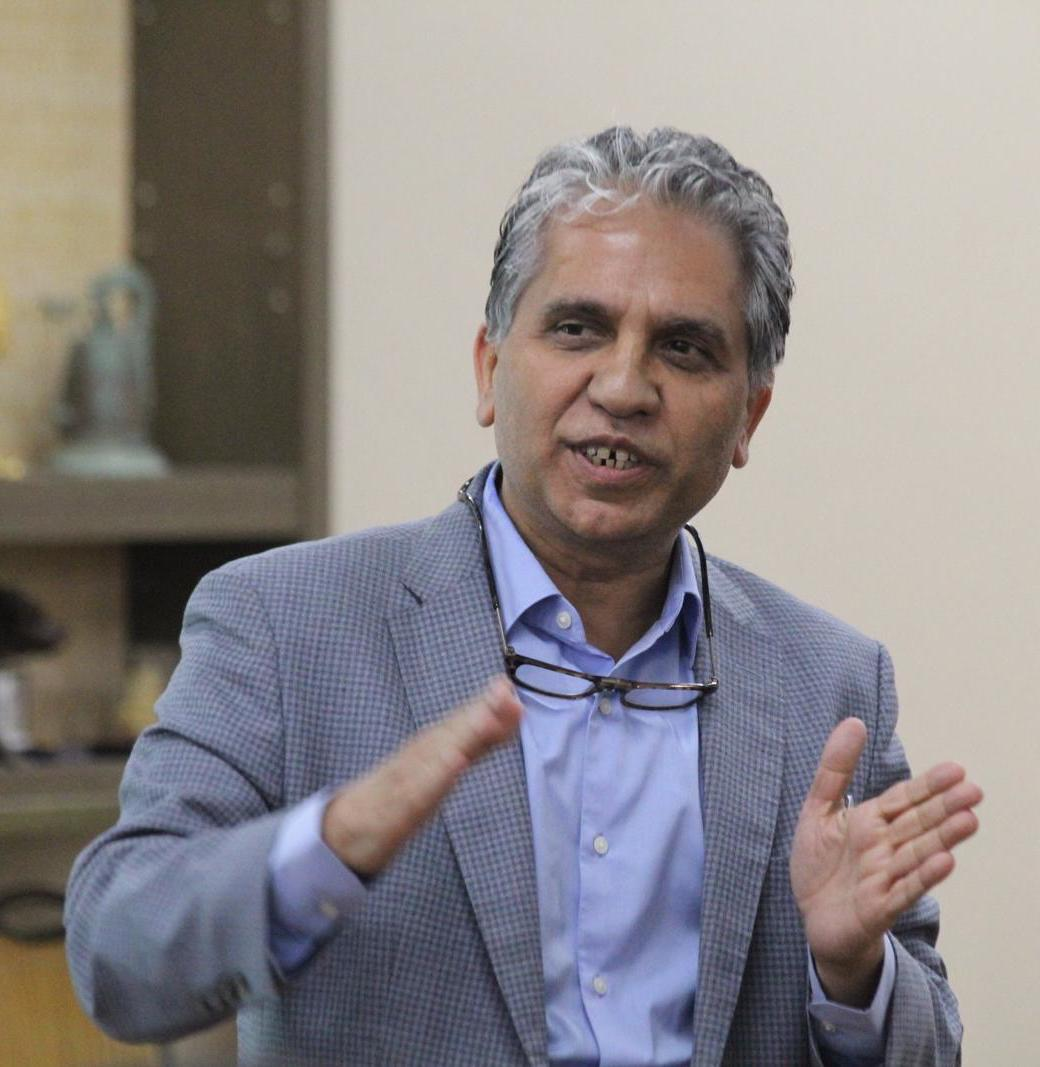
- Born: 1963; 63 years ago Nepal
- Education: Mehran University of Engineering and Technology, Northeastern University
- Occupation: Entrepreneur
- Known for: Co-founder of D2Hawkeye; Founder of Deerwalk; Founder of Deerwalk Institute of Technology; Founder & Executive Chairman of Deerhold Ltd
- Spouse: Muna Joshi
- Children: 2

Rudra Pandey (Nepali: रुद्र पाण्डे; born 1963) is a Nepali-American entrepreneur, currently serving as Founder & Executive Chairman of Deerhold Ltd, an American company providing Software Development and Information Technology services. He is also the Chairman of Deerwalk Institute of Technology and the Chairman of Hamro Patro. which is designed in collaboration with Ar. Pranab Man Singh Pradhan, a ronouned Architect of nepal (Son of Prafulla Man Singh Pradhan) In 2017, he received the prestigious FNCCI Gold Award (Trendsetters) in the sector of Information Technology.

== Early life and education ==
Pandey was born in Naubise, Dhading, Nepal in 1963. He obtained a bachelor's degree in electronics engineering from Mehran University of Engineering and Technology and a Ph.D. in economics from Northeastern University in the United States.

== Business ==
Pandy started his career worked as a parking booth attendant, business systems engineer, database architect and as a consultant.

He went on to co-founded D2Hawkeye where he served as Chief Technology Officer. After its acquisition by Verisk Analytics, D2Hawkeye became Verisk Health where Pandey served as Chief Operating Officer. "D2Hawkeye: Growing the Medical IT Enterprise" was a case study at Harvard Business School. D2Hawkeye was a recipient of Governor's Entrepreneurial Spirit Award in 2005.

He subsequently founded Deerwalk Inc., a healthcare analytics company based in Lexington, Massachusetts. Deerwalk was acquired by Cedar Gate Technologies in 2020. Deerwalk was featured in a case study "Offshore Pricing with Onshore Management: A Case Study in Innovation and Technology Management".

He then founded Deerhold Ltd where he served as chairman.

== Philanthropy ==
Pandey is involved in social work primarily via Deerwalk Foundation which has been doing work in the area of education, healthcare, tourism, sustainable development, agriculture and sanitation. He has also contributed to organizations like Help Nepal Network

== Family ==
He lives with his wife, Muna Joshi, in Lexington, Massachusetts. He has two daughters Erica Pandey and Maia (Mahika) Pandey.

== Public commentary and controversies ==
=== Higher education fees and public campus comparisons ===
In June 2026, Pandey drew public debate and online criticism following statements defending the tuition fee structure of private higher education institutions, specifically Deerwalk Institute of Technology. In his commentary, Pandey argued that high-quality higher education at private colleges carries substantial costs, contrasting Deerwalk's model with constituent public campuses such as Amrit Science Campus (Ascol) and Patan Multiple Campus. His remarks drew backlash across social media and student groups, with critics arguing that treating higher education as an exclusive market commodity undermines equitable access and accusing him of disparaging public institutions to promote his own commercial college.

=== Stance on foreign franchise colleges ===
In January 2026, Pandey released statements cautioning prospective students against enrolling in foreign-affiliated franchise programs operating in Nepal, characterizing offshore campus licensing models as commercial operations rather than accredited educational pathways. He raised concerns regarding credit transfers, degree recognition by Tribhuvan University, and admissions into international graduate programs. While observers noted that his warnings aligned with regulatory advisories issued by Nepal's Ministry of Education regarding foreign college oversight, critics and competing educational administrators argued that his remarks generalized legitimate international programs and were influenced by his commercial interests in domestic institutions.

=== Charity funding dispute with Mahabir Pun ===
In May 2023, Pandey engaged in a publicized social media dispute with social innovator Mahabir Pun concerning charitable funds raised in the United States through the Deerwalk Foundation for Pun's National Innovation Centre (NIC). Pandey claimed the foundation had withheld transferring the collected donations because Pun had not submitted formal project documentation required under US non-profit regulations, while Pun denied the claims and threatened legal action for defamation over accusations regarding fund handling.

=== iPhone import dispute with GenXT ===
In September 2024, Pandey was involved in a public dispute with Generation Next Communications (GenXT), Nepal's authorized distributor for Apple products, and the Nepal Telecommunications Authority (NTA). After regulatory authorities denied import clearance for iPhones sourced through Deercompware Limited—a venture under Pandey's Deerwalk Group—Pandey published social media statements alleging corruption within the regulatory process and questioning GenXT's distribution exclusivity. GenXT subsequently issued a press release and formal legal warning threatening defamation litigation, stating that Pandey was attempting an unauthorized parallel import of handsets without manufacturer authorization, which violated national import laws and favored gray-market channels.

== Publications ==
- Algorithmic Prediction of Health-Care Costs

- Antibiotic Use and Clostridium difficile Infection in the U.S. – A Population Based Study

- Offshore Pricing with Onshore Management: A Case Study in Innovation and Technology Management

- Angiotensin-converting enzyme inhibitors, angiotensin-receptor blockers, and risk of appendicitis

- Antihypertensive medications and risk of community-acquired pneumonia

- Sleep Quality and Quality of Life in Patients With COPD

== Case Studies ==
- Offshore Pricing with Onshore Management: A Case Study in Innovation and Technology Management

- D2Hawkeye: Growing the Medical IT Enterprise

== Media ==
- Rudra Pandey featured in the article 'Trekking to Nepal -- on business' on Denver Business Journal

- US Ambassador to Nepal, Scott H. DeLisi, commends Rudra Pandey for creating hundreds of high-paying jobs for Nepal’s youth

- Rudra Pandey featured in VenturePlus

- Rudra Pandey on EverestUncensored.org

- Rudra Pandey's hiking achievements on Everest Uncensored

- Opinion on Reconstruction after Earthquake (Nepali)

- Rudra Pandey's Interview in mnsvmag.com

- Youth Legend Nepal Interview : An Expert Take with Rudra Pandey
