= Deerwalk Institute of Technology =

Private college in Nepal

- Type: Private
- Established: 2010
- Affiliations: Tribhuvan University
- Chairman: Rudra Pandey
- Director: Hitesh Karki
- Location: Kathmandu, Nepal
- Website: deerwalk.edu.np/DWIT/

The Deerwalk Institute of Technology is a Tribhuvan University affiliated college. Deerwalk Institute of Technology provides extensive undergraduate programs, namely the Bachelor of Science in Computer Application and Information Technology (B.Sc.CSIT) and the Bachelor of Computer Applications (BCA).

== History ==
Deerwalk Institute of Technology was founded by Rudra Raj Pandey in 2010. It was first established collaboration between Nepalese entrepreneurs and the US-based software company, Deerwalk Inc. The first batch had a total of eight students.

== Buildings and infrastructure ==
The DWIT campus is situated in Sifal, Kathmandu. With lavish gardens, large and extended campus area, and canteen in its front yard, DWIT is spread over 11 ropanis campus. The top-floor of the main building is occupied by Sagarmatha Hall where all the major sessions are held. It is a spacious establishment with a capacity of over 250 people.

=== Library ===
DWIT Library consists of a significant number of books related to Computer Science. It is solely handled by Students interns at DWIT. All of the library transactions are done using Gyansangalo, DWIT's Library Management System.

=== Cafeteria ===
The DWIT cafeteria is situated at the front yard of the DWIT building. An online portal, Canteen Management System is used to carry out the canteen transactions. All members associated with DWIT can login into the system using their respective DWIT emails and order the food from a range of food options.

=== Classrooms ===
All the classrooms in DWIT have access to artificial lighting, floors, internet, TV, well maintained tables and chairs.

== Academics ==
DWIT offers Bachelors of Science in Computer Science and Information Technology (B. Sc. CSIT) and Bachelor in Computer Application (BCA) run under the curriculum of Tribhuvan University. These are among the comprehensive computer science courses offered by Tribhuvan University. The four-year course is categorized into two domains – Computer Science and Mathematics. In the first three-semester the course mainly consists of mathematics and basic programming concepts. In the latter semesters, the course progresses towards computational theory and artificial intelligence.

== Student life ==
The students in DWIT come from various cities and towns around Nepal.

=== Clubs and activities ===
There are twelve student-run clubs in DWIT, considered and established by students solely. Each club has a club president, a club vice-president, and five members at its core. Major activities and fundraising events are organized by the clubs.

=== Internship ===
Deerwalk Services

Deerwalk is a privately held company based in Lexington, Massachusetts, with over 300 employees worldwide, including a technology campus, DWIT. DWIT and Deerwalk Services occupy the same territory.

Deerwalk Compare Nepal

Deerwalk Compware is a subsidiary of Deerwalk Group and was founded in July 2017. It is the provider of IT consulting services, custom software development and IT products-distributor in Nepal.

Deerwalk Teaching Fellowship Program

In between 6th and 7th Semester, students of DWIT participate in a Deerwalk Teaching Fellowship Program. Deerwalk Institute of Technology has partnered with institutions like Edu Tech Nepal for this purpose.

Deerwalk Incubation Center

Deerwalk Incubation Center provides transitory and facilitative assistance to students who want to venture out with their own startups. Students are provided with basic office infrastructure and both legal and business counselling services.

== Research ==
=== DWIT Research and Development Unit (R&D Unit) ===
The DWIT Research and Development (R&D) team is the innovative unit of DWIT. The goal of the team is typically to research new products and services and add to the DWIT facilities and the society. The students of DWIT work in this department as interns. The major task of the team is the production of digital video classes. The video lectures are distributed for free by Deerwalk Learning Center. The videos are interactive learning resources for Grades 4-12, designed as per the curriculum prescribed by Curriculum Development Center. The videos have an estimated reach of more than 30 Lakhs in Nepal.

=== DWIT Incubation-center ===
DWIT provides a workplace for budding and neo-startups, known as the Incubation Center. It is a space given to student entrepreneurs to develop their businesses in the initial and transitional phases. The facility is provided until the start-ups are moderately stable.

== Major events ==
DWIT hosts major recurring events:

- DWIT Job Fair: An annual event run by DWIT to connect IT academia with industry recruiters. In its inaugural 2017 edition, more than 20 software companies participated with over 1,200 attendees, expanding in subsequent editions to over 25 companies and 1,500 registered attendees.
- DeerHack: An annual 48-hour hackathon organized by The Software Club of DWIT in association with the college. Its first edition took place from May 5 to May 7, 2023, at the Deerwalk Complex in Sifal.

== Public reception and debates ==
=== Tuition fee structure and commercialization ===
Deerwalk Institute of Technology has been the subject of public debate regarding its tuition fee structure, which is significantly higher than that of constituent campuses affiliated with Tribhuvan University. Critics, student organizations, and educational commentators have argued that high tuition rates in private IT colleges commercialize technical education and create economic barriers for students from lower-income backgrounds. In response, college leadership and supporting commentators have maintained that premium tuition models reflect substantial investments in campus infrastructure, private industry partnerships, and integrated placement tracks that differ from subsidized government campuses.

=== Media coverage and ranking disputes ===
The institution's public positioning and promotional rankings have drawn scrutiny from domestic media broadcasters, who raised questions regarding the metrics used in private IT college evaluations in Nepal. The college and its student body contested the reports, arguing that student outcomes, high-bandwidth lab infrastructure, and industry-oriented internships distinguish the institution from conventional programs.

== History ==
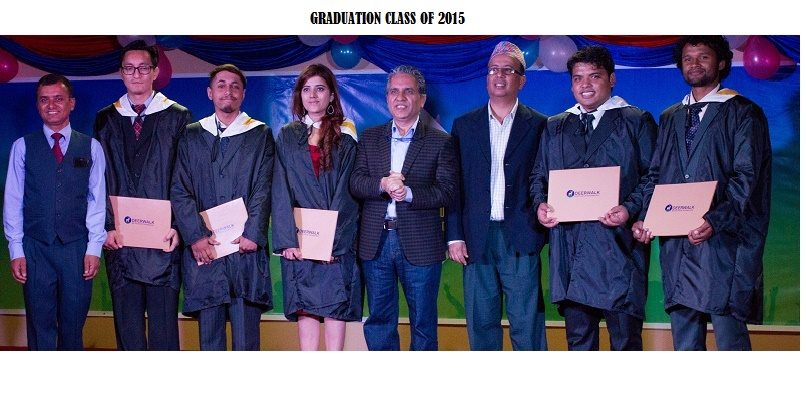
Graduation Image of the first batch of DWIT

Deerwalk Institute of Technology was founded by Rudra Raj Pandey in 2010. It was first established collaboration between Nepalese entrepreneurs and the US-based software company, Deerwalk Inc. The first batch had a total of eight students.

== Buildings and infrastructure ==
The DWIT campus is situated in Sifal, Kathmandu. With lavish gardens, large and extended campus area, and canteen in its front yard, DWIT is spread over 11 ropanis campus. The top-floor of the main building is occupied by Sagarmatha Hall where all the major sessions are held. It is a spacious establishment with a capacity of over 250 people.

=== Library ===
DWIT Library consists of a significant number of books related to Computer Science. It is solely handled by Students interns at DWIT.

All of the library transactions are done using Gyansangalo, DWIT's Library Management System.

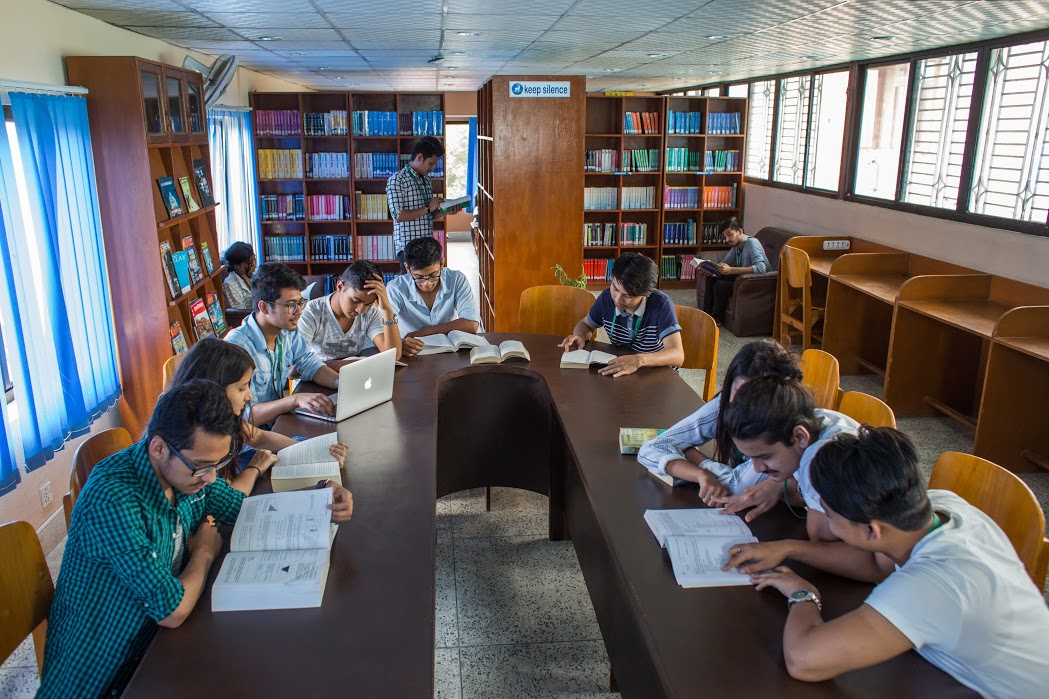
DWIT library

=== Cafeteria ===
The DWIT cafeteria is situated at the front yard of the DWIT building. An online portal, Canteen Management System is used to carry out the canteen transactions.

All members associated with DWIT can login into the system using their respective DWIT emails and order the food from a range of food options.

Well Equipped Classrooms

All the classrooms in DWIT have access to artificial lighting, floors, internet, TV, well maintained tables and chairs.

== Academics ==
DWIT offers Bachelors of Science in Computer Science and Information Technology (B. Sc. CSIT) and Bachelor in Computer Application (BCA) run under the curriculum of Tribhuvan University. These are among the comprehensive computer science courses offered by Tribhuvan University. The four-year course is categorized into two domains – Computer Science and Mathematics. In the first three-semester the course mainly consists of mathematics and basic programming concepts. In the latter semesters, the course progresses towards computational theory and artificial intelligence.

== Student life ==
The students in DWIT come from only various cities and towns around Nepal.

=== Clubs and activities ===
There are twelve student-run clubs in DWIT, considered and established by students solely. Each club has a club president, a club vice-president, and five members at its core. Major activities and fundraising events are organized by the clubs.

=== Internship ===
==== Deerwalk Services ====
Deerwalk is a privately held company based in Lexington, Massachusetts, with over 300 employees worldwide, including a technology campus, DWIT. DWIT and Deerwalk Services occupy the same territory.

==== Deerwalk Compare Nepal ====
Deerwalk Compware is a subsidiary of Deerwalk Group and was founded in July 2017. It is the provider of IT consulting services, custom software development and IT products-distributor in Nepal.

Deerwalk Teaching Fellowship Program

In between 6th and 7th Semester, students of DWIT participate in a Deerwalk Teaching Fellowship Program. Deerwalk Institute of Technology has partnered with institutions like Edu Tech Nepal for this purpose.

Deerwalk Incubation Center

Deerwalk Incubation Center provides transitory and facilitative assistance to students who want to venture out with their own startups. Students are provided with basic office infrastructure and both legal and business counselling services.

== Research ==
=== DWIT Research and Development Unit (R&D Unit) ===
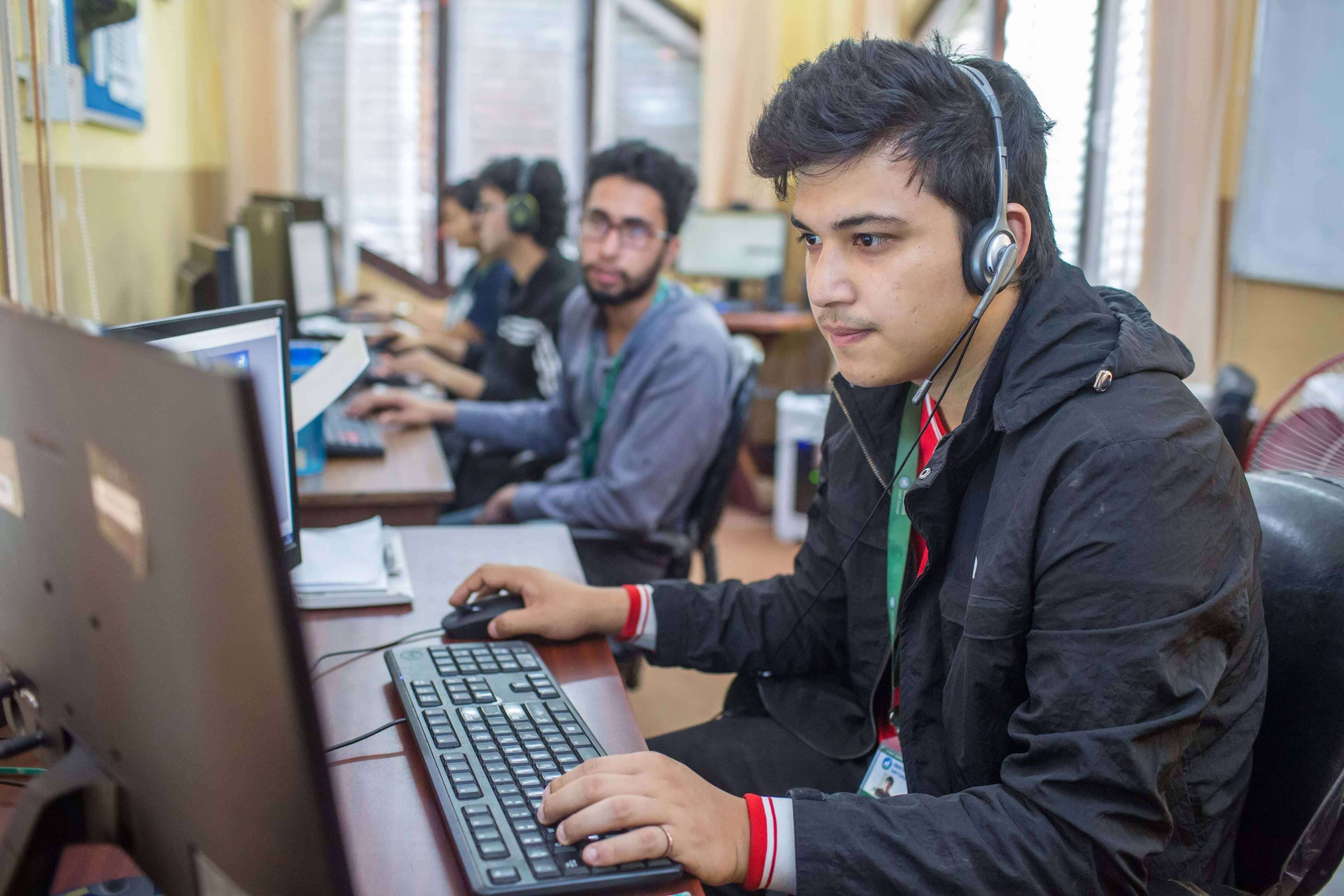
DWIT R&D Unit

The DWIT Research and Development (R&D) team is the innovative unit of DWIT. The goal of the team is typically to research new products and services and add to the DWIT facilities and the society. The students of DWIT work in this department as interns.

The major task of the team is the production of digital video classes. The video lectures are distributed for free by Deerwalk Learning Center. The videos are interactive learning resources for Grades 4-12, designed as per the curriculum prescribed by Curriculum Development Center. The videos have an estimated reach of more than 30 Lakhs in Nepal.

=== DWIT Incubation-center ===
DWIT provides a workplace for budding and neo-startups, known as the Incubation Center. It is a space given to student entrepreneurs to develop their businesses in the initial and transitional phases. The facility is provided until the start-ups are moderately stable.

== Major events ==
DWIT boasts of major events.

1. DWIT Job Fair - DWIT JOB FAIR is an annual event run by DWIT. The idea behind the fair is to bring together the IT Academia and IT industry in one common place providing a platform to directly interact with each other. In its first edition, DWIT JOB FAIR 2017, more than 20 different software companies participated in the event with over 1200 participants. This year we have 25+ companies participating in the event. More than 1500 students and graduates have already registered for the event.
2. DeerHack - DeerHack is an annual hackathon event organized by The Software Club of DWIT in association with the college. This is a 48 hours contest where teams from Nepal participate. The first edition of the event was held on May 5th - May 7th 2023 at Deerwalk Complex, Sifal.
