= Hamro Patro =

Nepalese Calendar App

- Original author: Shankar Uprety
- Initial release: 2010
- Platform: Android; IOS
- Available in: Nepali; English
- Type: Productivity
- Website: hamropatro.com
- As of: January 2024

Hamro Patro is a freemium Nepali calendar app for smartphones. As of 2024, it had been downloaded more than ten million times. It provides additional features including news, horoscope, foreign exchange rates, podcasts and Nepali FM radio stations.

The app is ad-supported so that it remains free, but an in-app subscription is available which removes the advertising.

== History ==
In 2010, founder Shankar Raj Upreti registered the calendar on the Apple App Store for Apple iOS, making it the first Nepali app to be registered on the platform. This team released 'Our Nepali English Dictionary' in 2016.
