= Campuses of Fordham University =

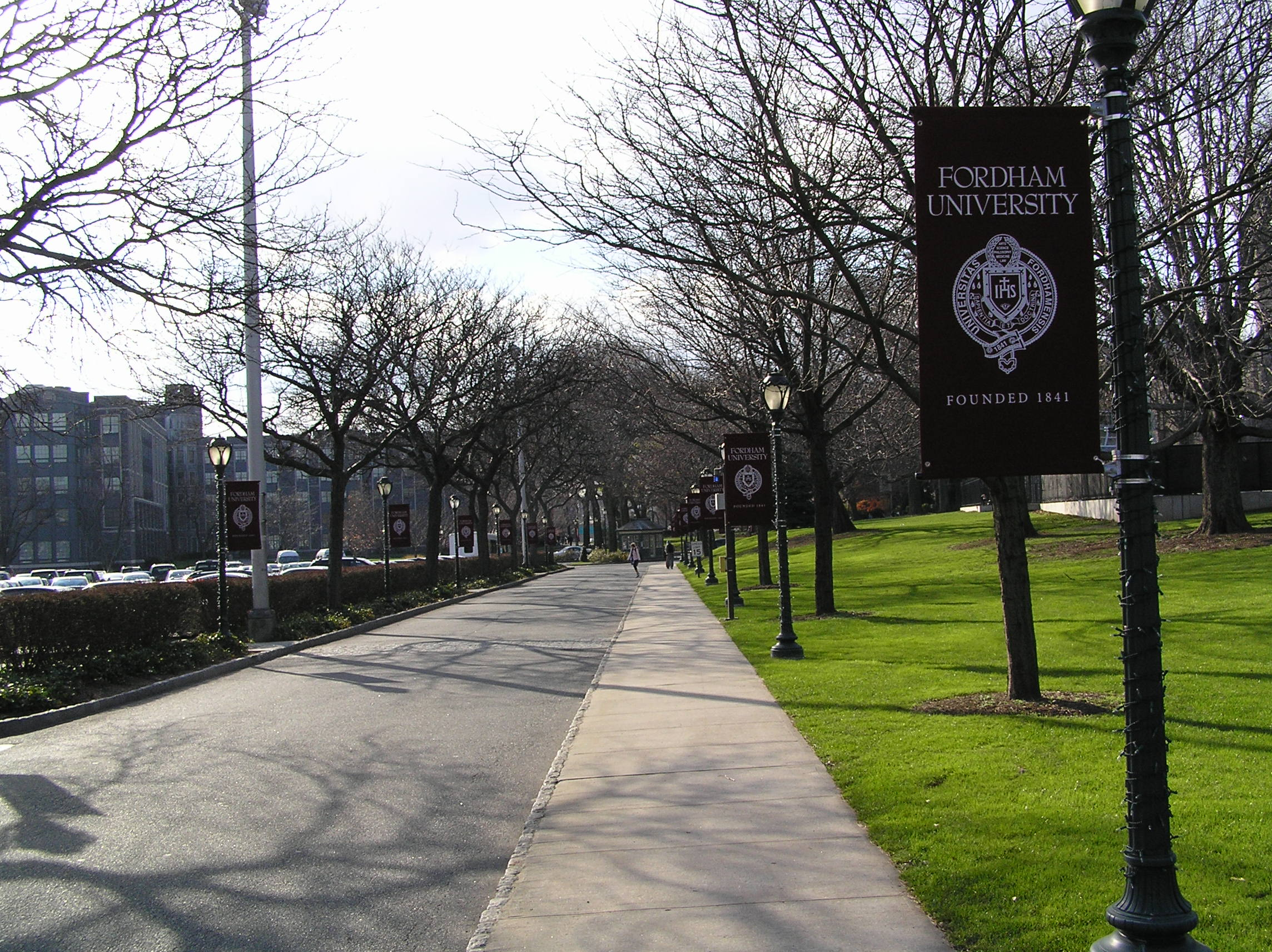
Main entrance to Fordham University, Rose Hill campus.

The Campuses of Fordham University are located within New York City and the New York City metropolitan area. The university's original Rose Hill campus is located in The Bronx on Fordham Road, while the Lincoln Center campus is located in Manhattan, one block west of Columbus Circle. The Westchester campus is located in Harrison, New York in Westchester County. Fordham University also maintains a campus in the Clerkenwell district of London and field offices in Spain and South Africa.

== Rose Hill Campus ==
The Rose Hill campus is Fordham's original campus, established in 1841 by bishop John Hughes. It is home to Fordham College at Rose Hill, the Gabelli School of Business, and a division of the School of Professional and Continuing Studies, as well as the Graduate Schools of Arts and Sciences and Religion and Religious Education. It is the largest of Fordham's three campuses, comprising 85 acres (34.4 ha) in the central Bronx; it is also among the largest privately owned green spaces in New York City, situated just north of the Belmont neighborhood on Fordham Road. The original land comprised 100 acres (40.5 ha), but the university sold 30 acres east of Southern Boulevard to the New York City government to become part of the New York Botanical Garden.

=== Buildings ===
==== Academic and administrative ====
| Building | Constructed | Image | Notes | Ref. |
|---|---|---|---|---|
| Collins Auditorium | 1904 | | Home of the university's auditorium, the theatre department, and the philosophy department at Rose Hill, named after President John J. Collins, S.J. | |
| Cunniffe House | 1836 | | Greek Revival-style administration building, and one of the oldest buildings on the Fordham campus; originally named Rose Hill Manor. Was officially renamed the Cunniffe House in 2013. | |
| Dealy Hall | 1867 | | Home to the university's psychology and humanities departments; original wing of building constructed in 1867, later expanded in 1891. Named after president Patrick F. Dealy, S.J. in 1935. | |
| Duane Library | 1926 | | Library named after William J. Duane, S.J., university president 1851–1854. As of 1998, the building no longer operates as a library, but as a multi-use facility for admissions and the university theology department. | |
| Faber Hall | 1963 | | Seven-story addition to Loyola Hall, originally a residential hall for Jesuits. Headquarters for the modern language department, as well as dorms for first year students. | |
| Freeman Hall | 1930 | | Building constructed for the physics department, named after science and physics professor Thomas J. A. Freeman, S.J. | |
| Hughes Hall | 1891 | | Originally constructed in 1891, the building housed the Fordham Preparatory School, and now houses the Gabelli School of Business. Named after university founder Archbishop John Hughes in 1935. | |
| Keating Hall | 1936 | | Four-floor Collegiate Gothic building constructed as the headquarters for the Graduate School of Arts and Sciences. Also houses three auditoriums, the Blue Chapel, and a bell tower. | |
| Larkin Hall | 1927 | | Building constructed as headquarters of the biology department, named after president John Larkin, S.J. | |
| Mulcahy Hall | 1969 | | University's chemistry building, erected as a gift to the university. | |
| Thebaud Hall | 1886 | | Built in 1886, this building was originally known only as the "science" building. It was later officially designated Thebaud Hall in 1935, named after French Jesuit Augustus Thébaud. Now the headquarters of the financial aid office. | |
| William D. Walsh Family Library | 1997 | | 1,000,000-volume library constructed in 1998. Houses Fordham's Museum of Greek, Etruscan and Roman Art. | |

==== Athletic and outdoor sports facilities ====
| Building | Constructed | Image | Notes | Ref. |
|---|---|---|---|---|
| Coffey Field | 1930 | | Football field, named after graduate athletics manager Jack Coffey; refurbished with 7,000 seat grandstand in the 1990s. | |
| Vince Lombardi Memorial Center | 1976 | | University athletic center and gym, dedicated to Vince Lombardi, alumnus and trustee. | |
| Rose Hill Gymnasium | 1924 | | 3,200-seat multi-purpose arena; officially opened on January 16, 1925. | |

==== Residential halls ====
| Name | Constructed | Image | Notes | Ref. |
|---|---|---|---|---|
| Campbell, Salice, and Conley Halls | 2009 | | Three residential halls for upperclassmen. | |
| Faber Hall | 1963 | | Seven-story addition to Loyola Hall; was originally a residential hall for Jesuits. Renovated in 2016 into a residential dorm for freshmen and transfers, as well as the headquarters for the modern language department. | |
| Finlay Hall | 1913 | | Originally constructed as the university medical school; after the medical school's closure in 1919, it became a science building. It is now a residence hall primarily for sophomores. | |
| Kohlmann Hall | 1920 | | Residence for retired Jesuits and Jesuit graduate students. | |
| Loschert Hall | 1987 | | Student residence hall named after William J. Loschert, businessman and alumnus. | |
| Loyola Hall | 1936 | | Built as a residential building for Jesuit faculty members, named after Ignatius Loyola. Now the home of the Manresa program, a freshman honors living community. | |
| Martyrs' Court | 1950 | | Undergraduate residential hall; named after three Jesuit missionaries martyred in New York in the 17th century: Saint Isaac Jogues, René Goupil, and Jean de Lalande. Jogues houses the first year science living community. | |
| Murray-Weigel Hall | 1922 | | Originally built as home of the Sacred Heart Messenger publication and later used to house Jesuit scholastics, the building is currently an infirmary housing retired Jesuits. | |
| O'Hare Hall | 2000 | | Three-winged student residential hall housing up to 560 students. Houses upperclassmen living communities. Named after former university president Joseph A. O'Hare, S.J. | |
| Queen's Court | 1940 | | Residential building for students, consolidated from three separate residences (Bishops' Hall, St John's Hall, and St. Robert's Hall) in 1940. This dorm contains the first year wellness community. | |
| Spellman Hall | 1946 | | Three-story residence for Jesuits who serve Fordham University and Fordham Prep, named after Cardinal Francis Spellman. | |
| Tierney Hall | 1986 | | Three-story student residential hall; originally named Sesquicentennial Hall. Renamed Tierney Hall after the death of William Tierney, class of 1998. | |
| Walsh Hall | 1972 | | Thirteen-story residential hall for upperclassmen, named after Fordham President Father Michael P. Walsh, S.J. Located along 191st Street. Known as the "555" upon opening. | |

==== Church facilities ====
===== Churches =====
| Church or chapel | Constructed | Image | Notes | Ref. |
|---|---|---|---|---|
| University Church | 1845 | | Originally built as a seminary chapel and parish church for the surrounding community. It contains the altar from the Old St. Patrick's Cathedral, as well as stained glass windows given to the university by King Louis Philippe I of France. | |

===== Chapels =====
| Name | Location | Image | Notes | Ref. |
|---|---|---|---|---|
| Blue Chapel | Keating Hall | | Memorial chapel located on third floor of Keating Hall, constructed in 1937. Designed with faux stone walls, a faux brick ceiling and dark wood details. Features a blue stained glass window of saints and a Swedish steel altarpiece draped in blue damask fabric. | |
| Our Lady's Chapel | University Church | —N/a | Located in the basement of the University Church. | |
| Sacred Heart Chapel | Dealy Hall | —N/a | Chapel located on the ground floor of Dealy Hall. | |
| St. Robert Bellarmine Chapel | Spellman Hall | —N/a | Used by the Jesuit community who reside at Spellman Hall. | |

==== Other facilities ====
| Building | Constructed | Image | Notes | Ref. |
|---|---|---|---|---|
| Alpha House | c. 1864 | | Cottage housing a seminar room and a lounge for students enrolled in the Fordham College Honors Program. Formerly the university gatehouse. | |
| Alumni House | 1840 | | Second-oldest building on Fordham campus after Cunniffe House; built by William Rodrigue, brother-in-law of John Hughes. Now operates as coffeehouse. | |
| Joseph M. McShane Campus Center | 2022 | | Community center connecting the Rose Hill Gymnasium and Vince Lombardi Center, housing cafeteria, gym, student lounge, and other multi-use spaces. Named after President Joseph M. McShane. | |
| University Cemetery | 1938 | | 138-plot cemetery where Jesuits, workers, and other clergy are interred. | |
| William Spain Seismic Observatory | 1931 | | Seismic observatory named after William Spain, a student of the university who died unexpectedly. Was formerly located in Loyola Hall and Keating Hall before being moved to the building adjacent to Freeman and Keating Halls. | |

== Lincoln Center Campus ==
In 1954, Robert Moses proposed that Fordham might "be interested in an alternative [to renting space in the New York Coliseum]" involving a new building in a part of the area to the north of Columbus Circle to be redeveloped. In March 1958, Mayor Robert Wagner signed the deeds transferring the Lincoln Center campus to Fordham University.

The Lincoln Center campus is home to Fordham College at Lincoln Center and a division of the School of Professional and Continuing Studies, as well as the School of Law, the Graduate Schools of Education and Social Service, and the Fordham School of Business. The 8-acre (32,000 m^{2}) campus occupies the area from West 60th Street to West 62nd Street between Columbus and Amsterdam Avenues, placing it in the cultural heart of Manhattan. Lincoln Center has two grassy plazas, built one level up from the street. The larger expanse was once a barren cement landscape known as "Robert Moses Plaza;" the smaller is known as "St. Peter's Garden" and contains a memorial to the Fordham students and alumni who perished in the September 11, 2001 attacks.

=== Buildings ===
==== Academic and administrative ====
| Building | Constructed | Image | Notes | Ref. |
|---|---|---|---|---|
| Leon Lowenstein Building | 1969 | | Fourteen-story classroom building; also features cafeteria, bookstore, theater, and a lounge on the 12th floor for public speaking and other events. | |
| Law Building | 2014 | | Home of Fordham's law school. Formerly located in New York's Financial District. An entirely new law school building was finished in 2014, and also houses a residence hall. | |
| Gabelli Building | 2018 | | Newly expanded/renovated building for the Gabelli School of Business and Student Extracurricular Affairs. | |

==== Residence halls ====
| Building | Constructed | Image | Notes | Ref. |
|---|---|---|---|---|
| McMahon Hall | 1993 | —N/a | Twenty-story residential hall for Lincoln Center students (graduate and undergraduate), named after Father George McMahon, S.J. | |
| McKeon Hall | 2014 | —N/a | Twelve-story residential hall for undergraduate freshmen | |

==== Church facilities ====
| Name | Location | Image | Notes | Ref. |
|---|---|---|---|---|
| Bl. Rupert Meyer Chapel | Leon Lowenstein Building | —N/a | Located on second floor of Lowenstein Building. | |

== Westchester Campus ==
The Westchester campus is a single, 62,500-square-foot building located in west Harrison, New York. It serves as a branch campus for multiple programs offered at both Rose Hill and Lincoln Center.

== London Centre Campus ==
In October 2018, Fordham expanded its study abroad program in London to its own space, the London Centre. The campus is 17,000 square feet of property housed in the Clerkenwell district in the borough of Camden. It features a student centre, a rooftop terrace, a learning resource centre, and a performance floor dedicated to the Drama program. The London Centre offers programs in business, theater, and the liberal arts to students from Fordham and other colleges and universities.

== See also ==
- Louis Calder Center
- Fordham Preparatory School
