= Sarah E. Winter =

American Scholar of Literature

Sarah E. Winter is an American Scholar of Literature, currently Professor of English at the University of Connecticut. She is also Director of the Research Program on Humanitarianism at the Human Rights Institute at the University of Connecticut.

Winter grew up in Santa Barbara, California where she was involved in honors society and dance in high school. She then earned her B.A. in Comparative Literature from the University of California, Berkeley, and her Ph.D. in Comparative Literature from Yale University. After teaching as Assistant Professor and then Associate Professor at Yale University, she accepted a call to the University of Connecticut as Associate Professor in 2002 and was promoted to Professor in 2012.

Her research focuses on nineteenth-century British literature and history, Sigmund Freud, Charles Darwin, and the History of Education. Her article Darwin’s Saussure: Biosemiotics and Race in Expression won the Donald Gray Prize of the North American Victorian Studies Association in 2009 for the best essay in the field of Victorian Studies.

== Selected publications ==
- Sarah Winter, "Domestic Fictions: Feminine Deference and Maternal Shadow Labor in Dickens' Little Dorrit." Dickens Studies Annual 18 (1990): pp. 243–54.
- Sarah Winter, "Mental Culture: Liberal Pedagogy and the Emergence of Ethnographic Knowledge." Victorian Studies 41 (Spring 1998, published in 1999): pp. 427–54
- Sarah Winter, Freud and the Institution of Psychoanalytic Knowledge (Stanford: Stanford University Press, 1999).
- Sarah Winter, "Cultural Politics and the Sociology of the University." The Yale Journal of Criticism 18 (Fall 2005): pp. 473–78.
- Sarah Winter, "Darwin’s Saussure: Biosemiotics and Race in Expression." Representations 107 (Summer 2009): pp. 128–61.
- Sarah Winter, The Pleasures of Memory: Learning to Read with Charles Dickens (Fordham University Press, 2011).
- Sarah Winter, et al. (co-editor), From Political Economy to Economics through Nineteenth-Century Literature: Reclaiming the Social (Palgrave Macmillan, 2019, forthcoming).
