= Keating Hall =

Gothic university building in the Bronx, New York, US

Coordinates: 40.86073273°N 73.88953489°W

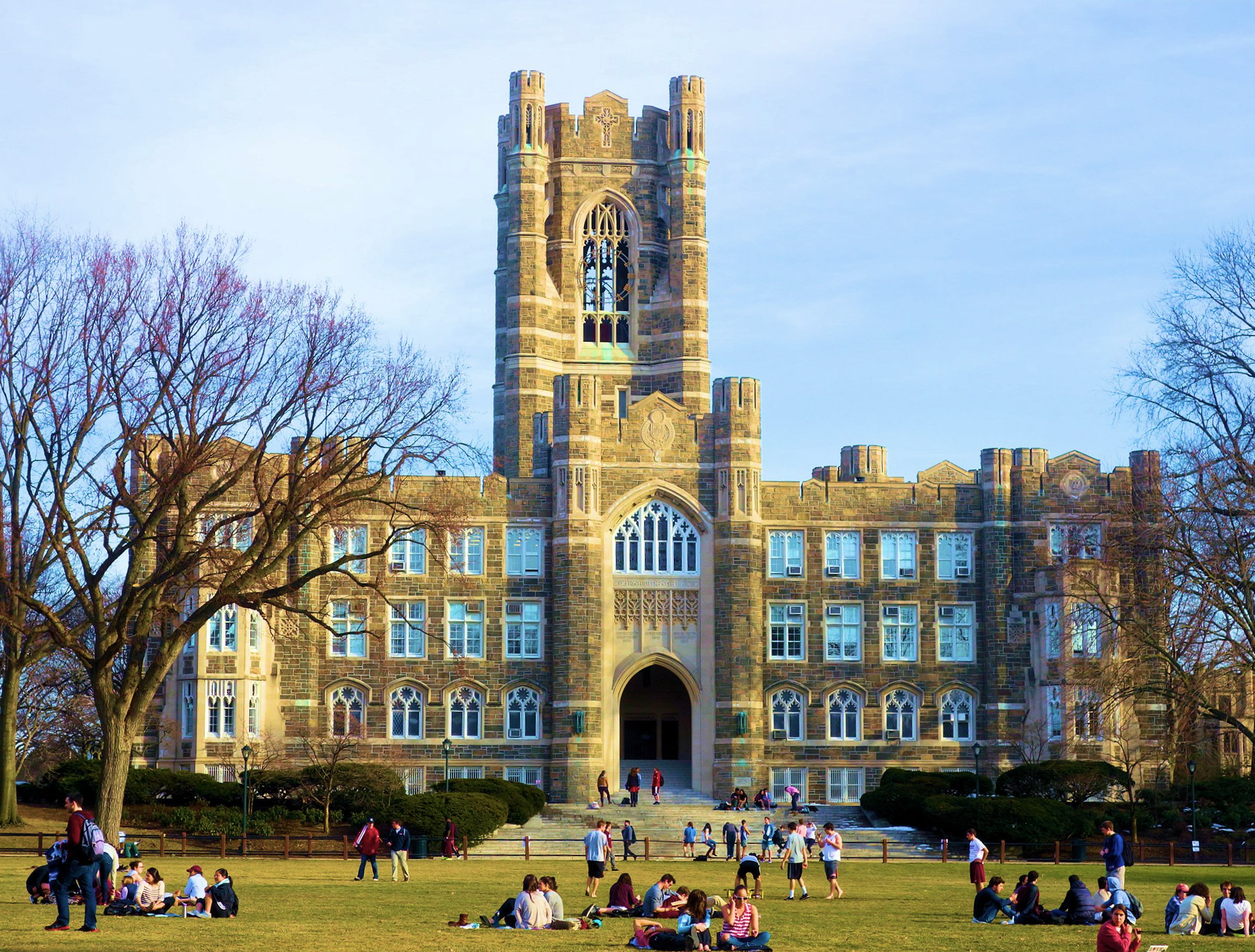
- Interactive map of the Keating Hall area

General information
- Architectural style: Collegiate Gothic; Tudor Gothic
- Location: Fordham University (Rose Hill campus), The Bronx, New York City, New York, United States
- Completed: 1936

Technical details
- Floor count: 4

Keating Hall is a building located at Fordham University in the Bronx, New York City. Constructed in 1936, it is considered the "centerpiece" of the university's main Rose Hill campus and is the home to the university's Graduate School of Arts and Sciences.

== History ==
After the establishment of Fordham University in 1841, the construction of Keating began in the 1930s on a proposed budget of $65,500 and was named after Joseph Keating, S.J., the university treasurer from 1910 to 1948. The architecture, characterized as Collegiate Gothic, was influenced by Gasson Hall at Boston College. The tower of Keating Hall was a feature insisted upon by Father Hogan, the university's president, at an additional proposed cost of $25,000 (the tower ultimately cost $343,000 to erect). The construction ultimately cost $1.3 million, two to three times the original estimated cost. The building's original intention when constructed under the supervision of Father Hogan, was to be the home for the Graduate School of Arts and Sciences, which it still serves today. Upon its completion, the university hosted its first commencement ceremony on Edwards Parade, the grassy field in front of Keating Hall, on June 10, 1936. The university's commencement ceremonies have taken place on the front steps of Keating ever since.

In addition to housing the Graduate School of Arts and Sciences offices, the building also houses three auditoriums, as well as the Blue Chapel on the third floor.

During World War II, the Keating Hall was designated by the city of New York as an air raid shelter, and its tower was used as the official lookout post for the northeast Bronx. Until 1960 upon the completion of the McGinley Center, Keating Hall's basement was home to the university cafeteria. In the 1990s during the construction of the William D. Walsh Family Library, the basement space of Keating Hall was used to store 300,000 books.

On April 14, 2019, Fordham University senior Sydney Monfries fell to her death from the Keating Hall clocktower.

== Architectural features ==
The front steps leading up to the façade of Keating Hall are engraved with the names of the presidents of nations that have received degrees from Fordham, called the "Terrace of the Presidents."

== In popular culture ==
Keating Hall has appeared in several films: The basement of Keating was also used as a filming location for William Friedkin's The Exorcist (1973) and Ron Howard's A Beautiful Mind (2001). The spacious auditoriums in Keating have also been used in several films: The first-floor auditorium was used as a filming location for a scene in Wall Street 2: Money Never Sleeps (2010) and Fair Game (2010), while the building's third-floor auditorium appeared in a scene from Quiz Show (1994).

Additionally, a scene from The Adjustment Bureau (2011) was shot on the exterior steps of Keating Hall, and the exterior of the building can be seen in Love Story (1970).

In 2009, the band U2 performed on the front steps of Keating which aired live on Good Morning America in support of their album No Line on the Horizon.

== Gallery ==
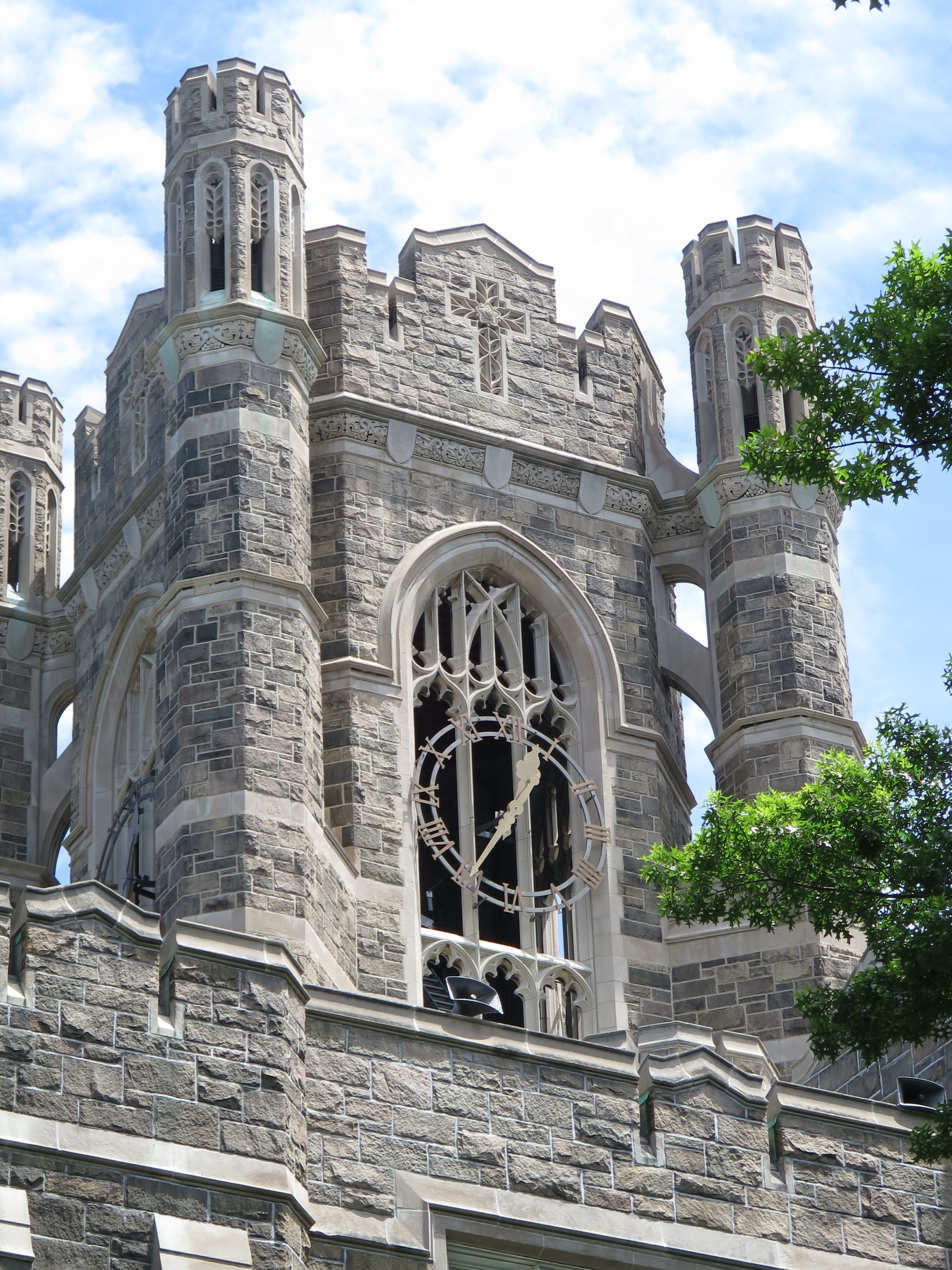
Tower of Keating Hall.

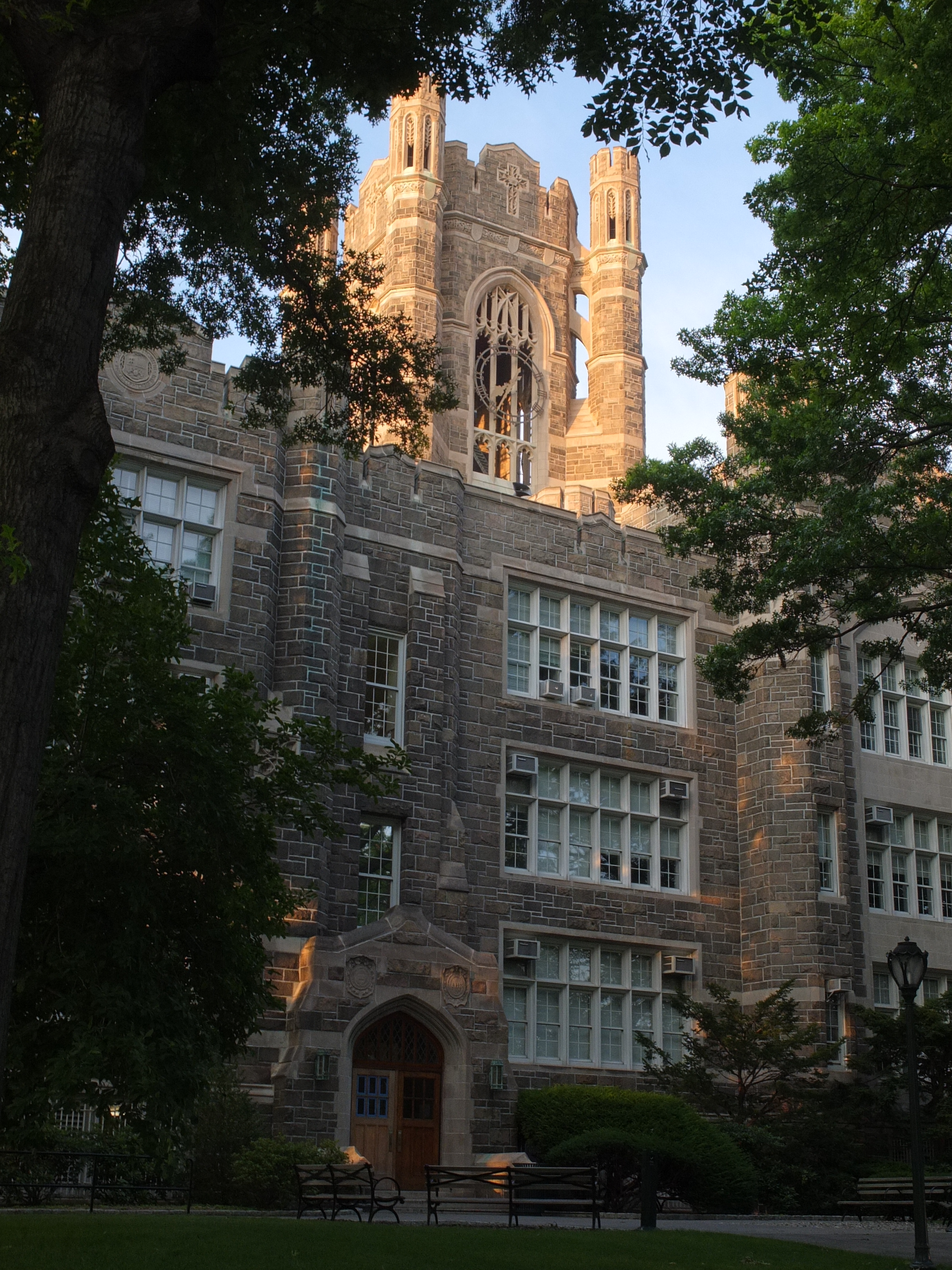
Keating Hall, viewed from south.

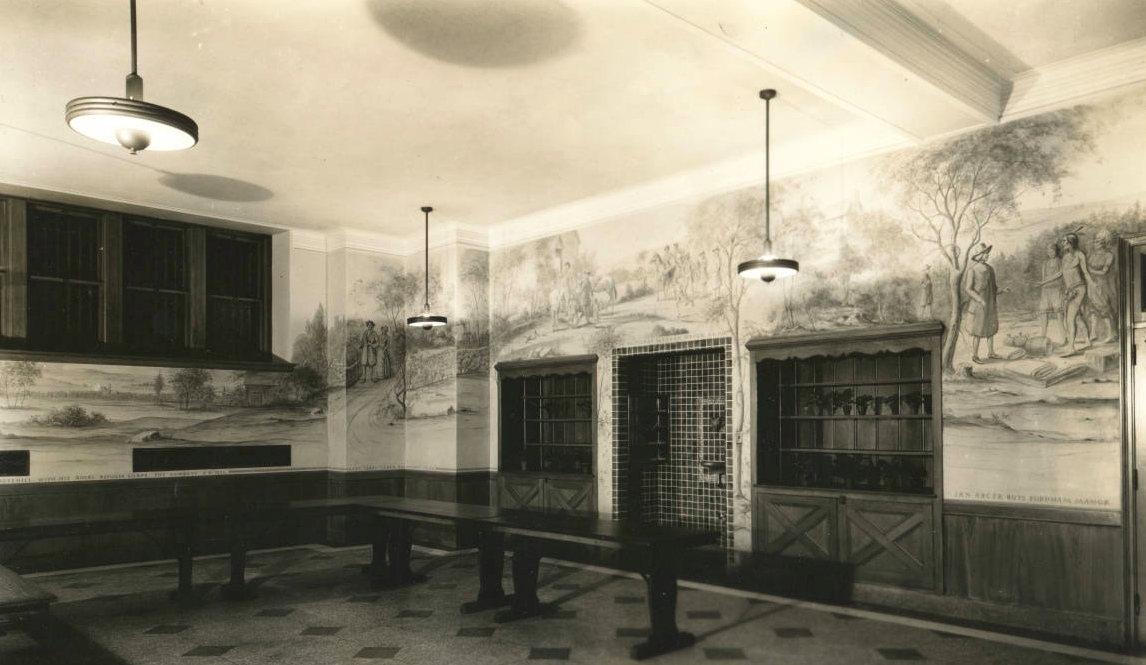
Original dining room in Keating Hall, ca. 1936.

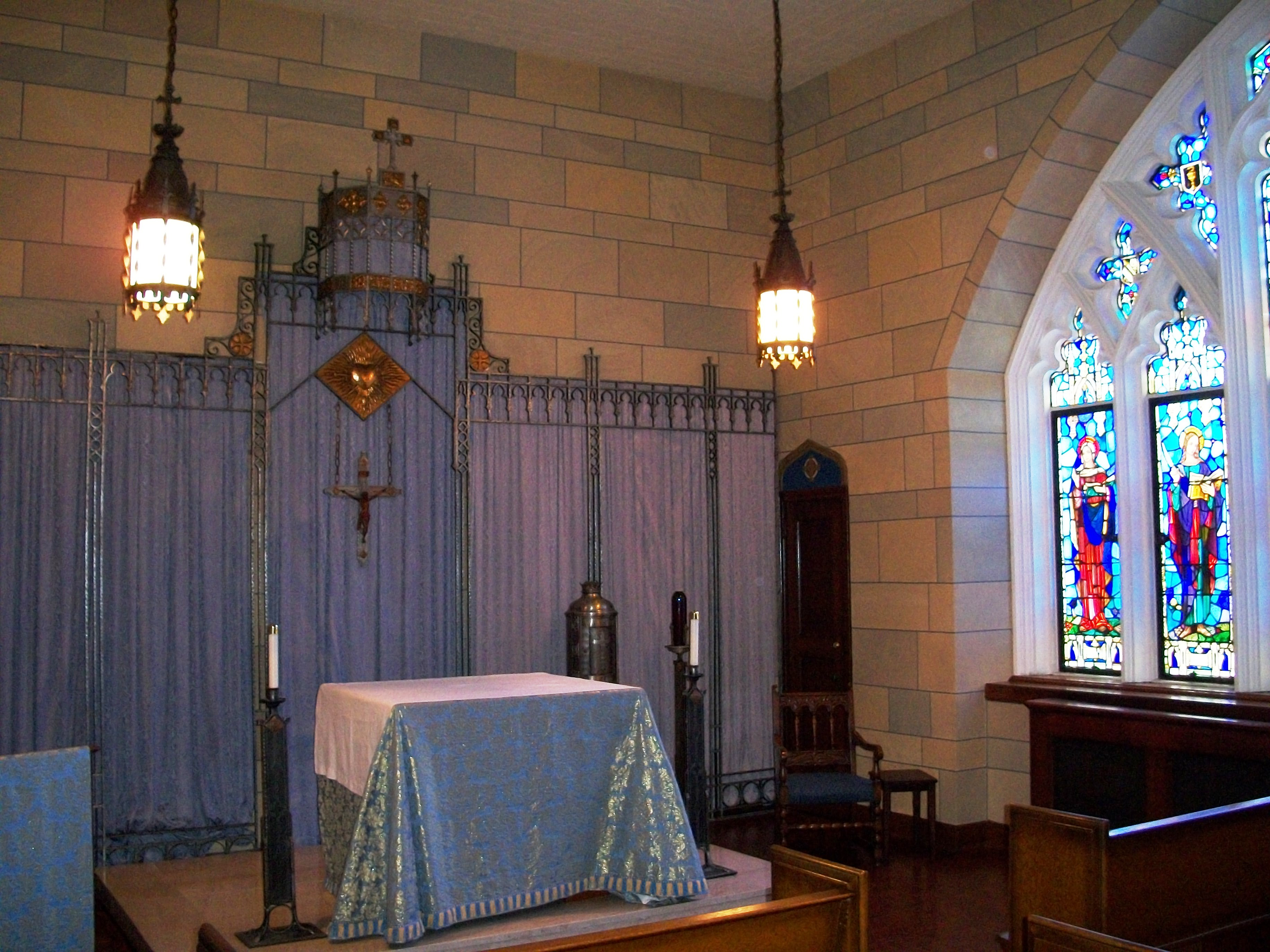
Blue Chapel on third floor of Keating Hall.

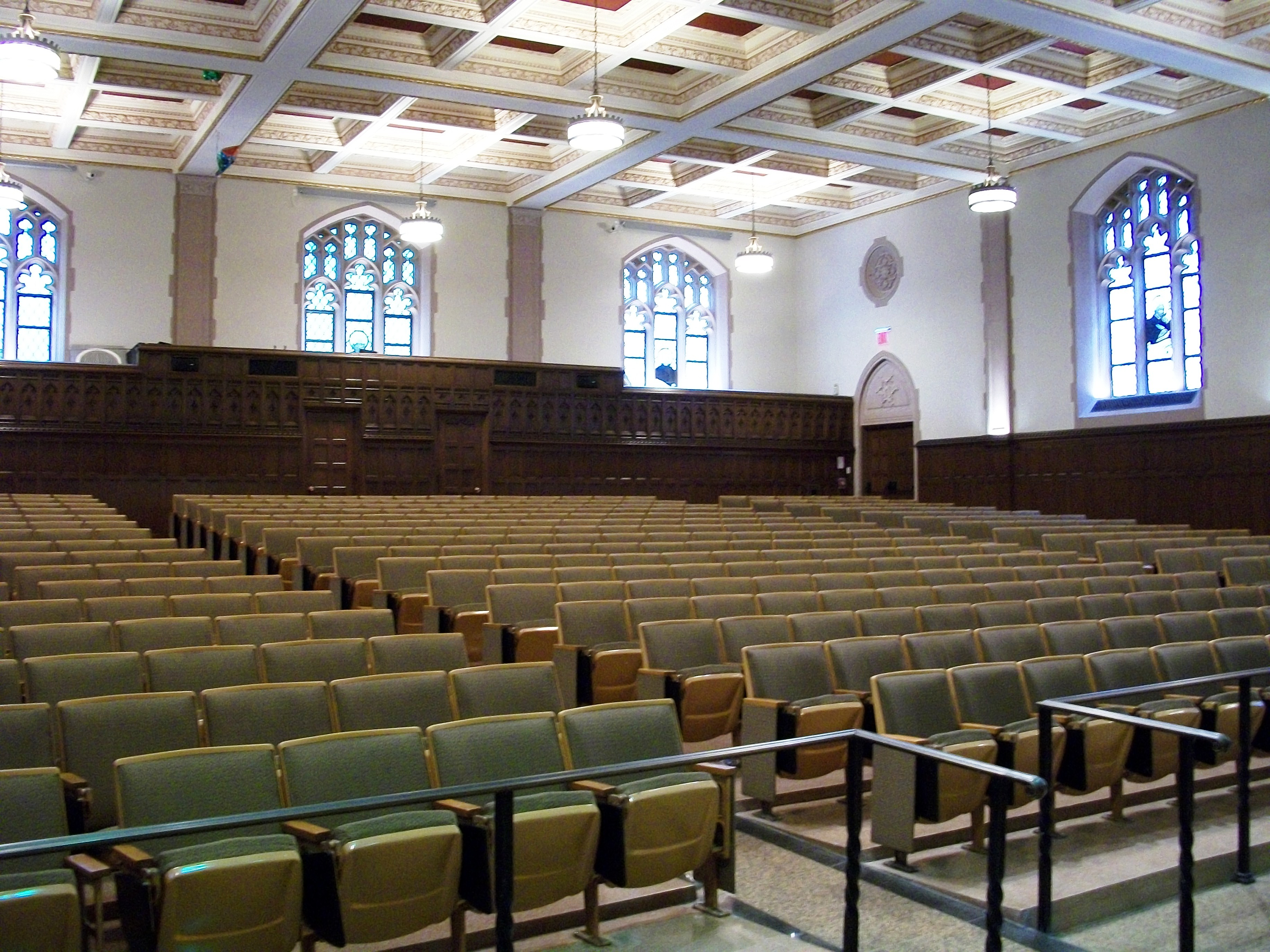
First-floor auditorium of Keating Hall.

== Works cited ==
- Schroth, Raymond A. (2008). Fordham: A History and Memoir (Revised ed.). New York: Fordham University Press. ISBN 978-0-823-22977-2.
- Shelley, Thomas J. (2016). Fordham, A History of the Jesuit University of New York: 1841-2003. New York: Fordham University Press.
