= Fordham University Press =

American publishing company

- Parent company: Fordham University
- Founded: 1907
- Country of origin: United States
- Headquarters location: New York City, New York
- Distribution: Ingram Publisher Services (US); Combined Academic Publishers (UK); CoInfo (Australia); Canadian Manda Group (Canada)
- Publication types: Book, journals, DVDs
- Nonfiction topics: Anthropology; philosophy; theology; history; classics; communications; economics; literature; sociology; business; political science; law; fine arts
- Imprints: Empire State Editions
- Official website: www.fordhampress.com

The Fordham University Press is a publishing house, a division of Fordham University, that publishes primarily in the humanities and the social sciences. Fordham University Press was established in 1907 and is headquartered at the university's Lincoln Center campus. It is the oldest Catholic university press in the United States, and the seventh-oldest in the nation.

It has been a member of the Association of University Presses since 1938, and it was a founding charter member of the Association of Jesuit University Presses (AJUP). The press was established "not only to represent and uphold the values and traditions of the University itself, but also to further those values and traditions through the dissemination of scholarly research and ideas".

== History ==
Fordham University Press was established in 1907. After the close of the university's medical school in 1922, the press operated under the Graduate School of Arts and Sciences and began publishing textbooks in education, English, law, philosophy, and psychology.

The press was headquartered in the Canisius Hall building in the Rose Hill campus for over 100 years. In March 2017, the press relocated from its original headquarters at the university's Rose Hill campus in the Bronx to the Lincoln Center campus in Manhattan.

Fordham University Press joined The Association of American Publishers trade organization in the Hachette v. Internet Archive lawsuit which resulted in the removal of access to over 500,000 books from global readers.

== Series ==
- American Philosophy
- Forms of Living
- The Future of the Religious Past
- International Humanitarian Affairs
- Just Ideas
- The McGannon Center Everett C. Parker Book Series
- Medieval Philosophy: Texts and Studies
- Moral Philosophy and Moral Theology
- The North's Civil War
- Orthodox Christianity and Contemporary Thought
- Perspectives in Continental Philosophy
- Poets Out Loud
- Reconstructing America
- World War II: The Global, Human, and Ethical Dimension

== Initiatives ==
- The American Literatures Initiative
- The Modern Language Initiative

== Bestselling publications ==
- Greek: An Intensive Course by Hardy Hansen and Gerald Quinn
- Autobiography of St. Ignatius Loyola by John C. Olin
- Deconstruction in a Nutshell by John D. Caputo
- Giving an Account of Oneself by Judith Butler
- Love of Learning and Desire for God by Jean Leclercq, O.S.B.
- Red Tail Captured, Red Tail Free by Alexander Jefferson
- Under the Sidewalks of New York by Brian Cudahy
- Byzantine Theology by John Meyendorff
- Irish Brigade and Its Campaign by David P. Conyngham
- An Aquinas Reader Edited by Mary T. Clark
- The Street Book by Henry Moscow
- The Search for Major Plagge by Michael Good

== See also ==
- List of English-language book publishing companies
- List of university presses
