= Duane Library =

Coordinates: 40.86073273°N 73.88953489°W

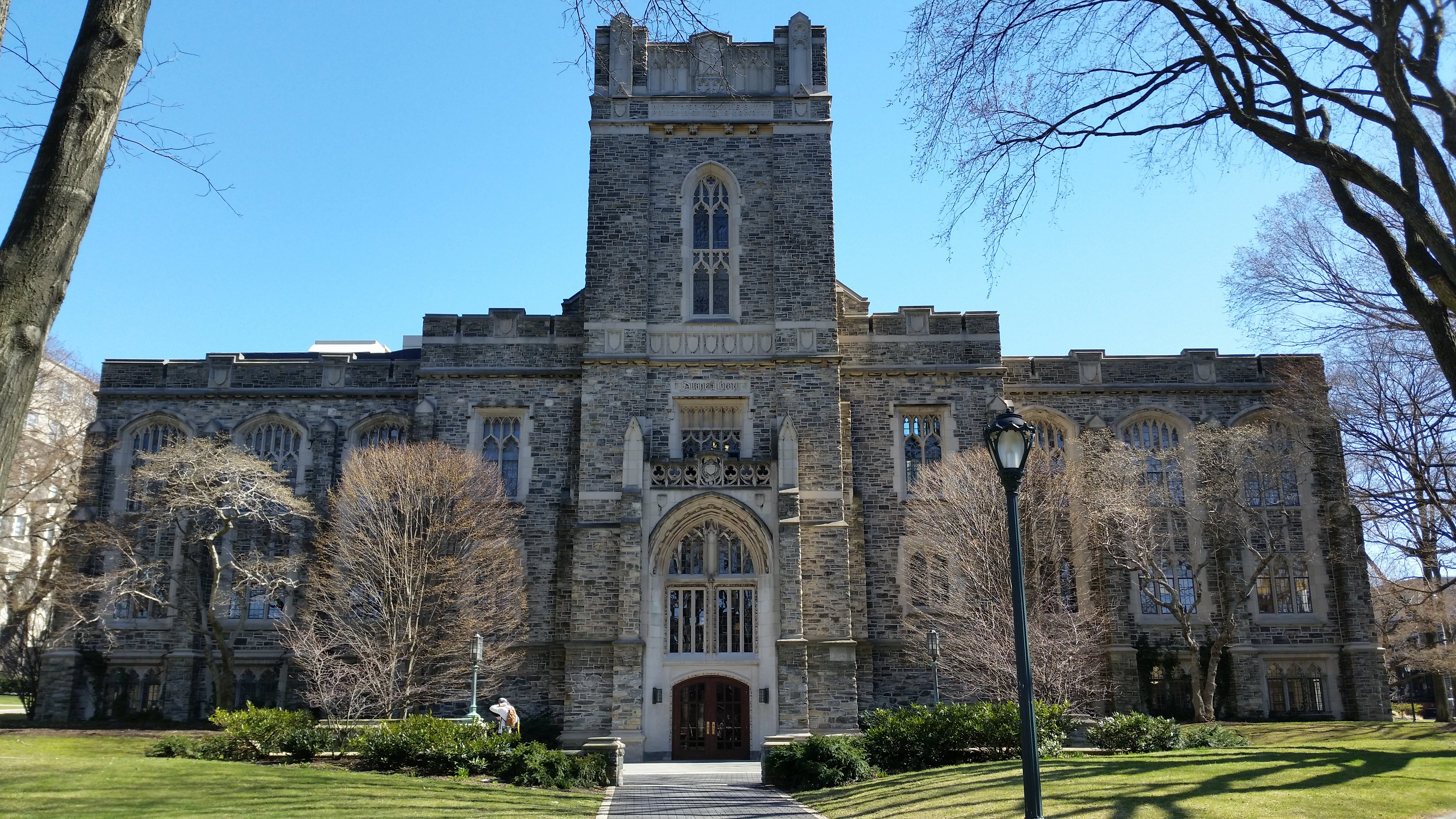
- Interactive map of the Duane Library area

General information
- Architectural style: Gothic Revival
- Location: Fordham University, The Bronx, New York City, New York, United States
- Completed: 1928

Technical details
- Floor area: 60,000 square feet (5,600 m^{2})

Duane Library is a former library located at Fordham University's Rose Hill campus, originally constructed in 1926. After the construction of the William D. Walsh Family Library in 1997, Duane Library officially closed. Renovated in 2004, it now houses the university's admissions office and theology department.

== History ==
=== Construction ===
Excavation for Duane Library began shortly after the university's completion of the Rose Hill Gymnasium in January 1925, and construction formally began in 1926. The library was completed in 1928. It was named after Father William J. Duane, S.J. the university's president from 1924 to 1930. Its interior features a spiral staircase and oak paneling, and capacity to store 150,000 volumes.

=== Renovation and repurposing ===
In the 1990s during the construction of the William D. Walsh Family Library, the basement space of Keating Hall was used to store 300,000 books that had been held in the Duane Library collection. After the completion of the Walsh Family Library, the Duane Library was officially closed to students and faculty and sat empty.

In 2004, a $12 million restoration project of the library was undertaken. A new staircase was added to the building, which used marble slabs from the library's original stacks. Additionally, the original granite porch of the library's second-floor entrance was removed, relocating the main entrance to grade. The interior restoration required the creation of corridors in order to make the building multi-use, as the original interior had been a single open space.

After the completion of the restoration, Duane Library became the official home of the university's admissions and theology department, as well as providing lecture and study spaces.

=== Recent history ===
In 2018, the university was gifted a quarter-scale reproduction of Michelangelo's Sistine Chapel ceiling fresco by the Metropolitan Museum of Art. The digital reproduction was made for the Met's exhibit, Michelangelo: Divine Draftsman and Designer, which ran from November 2017 to February 2018. It is on display in Duane Library's Butler Commons.

== Gallery ==
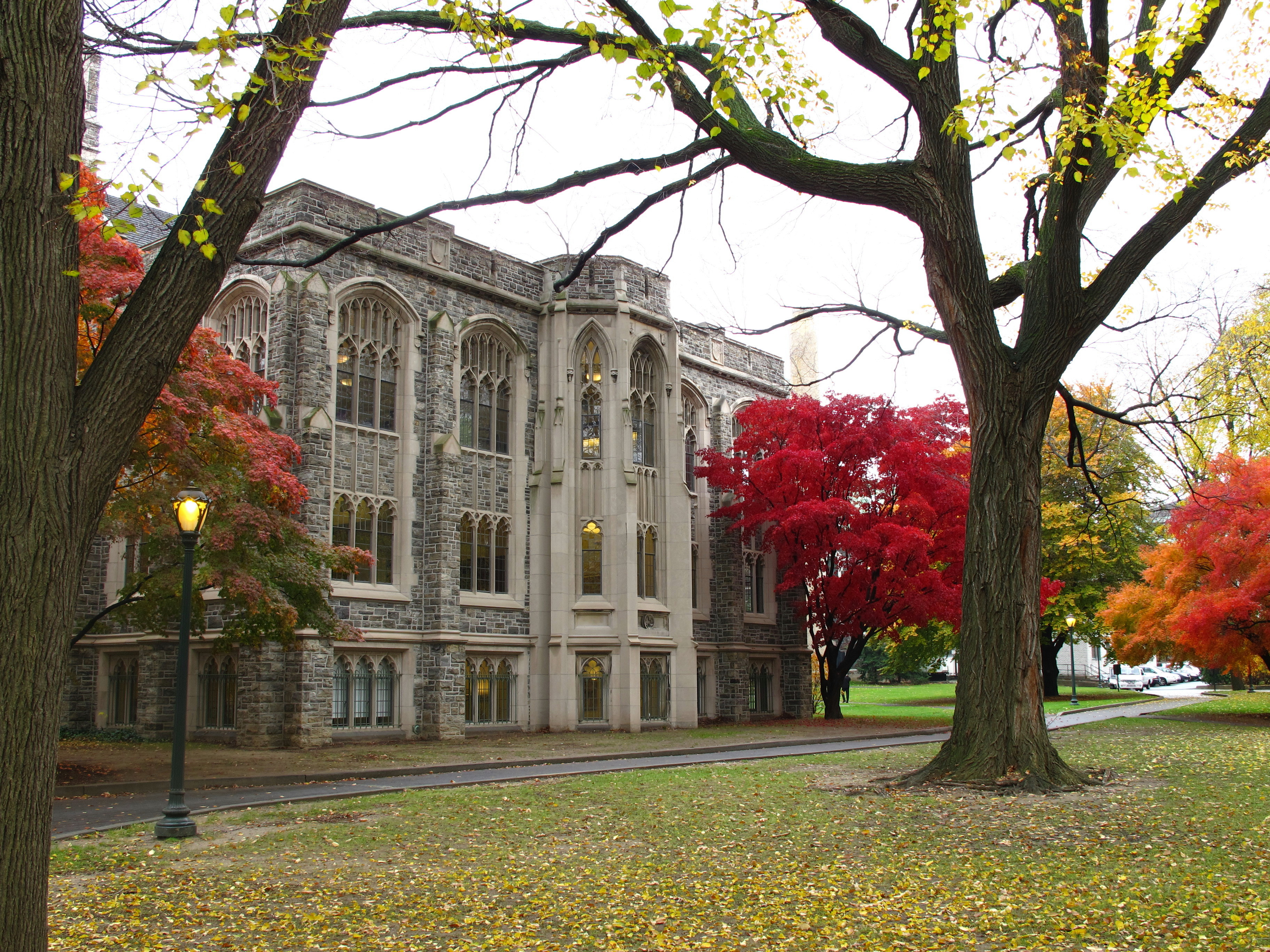
Duane Library, viewed from the south

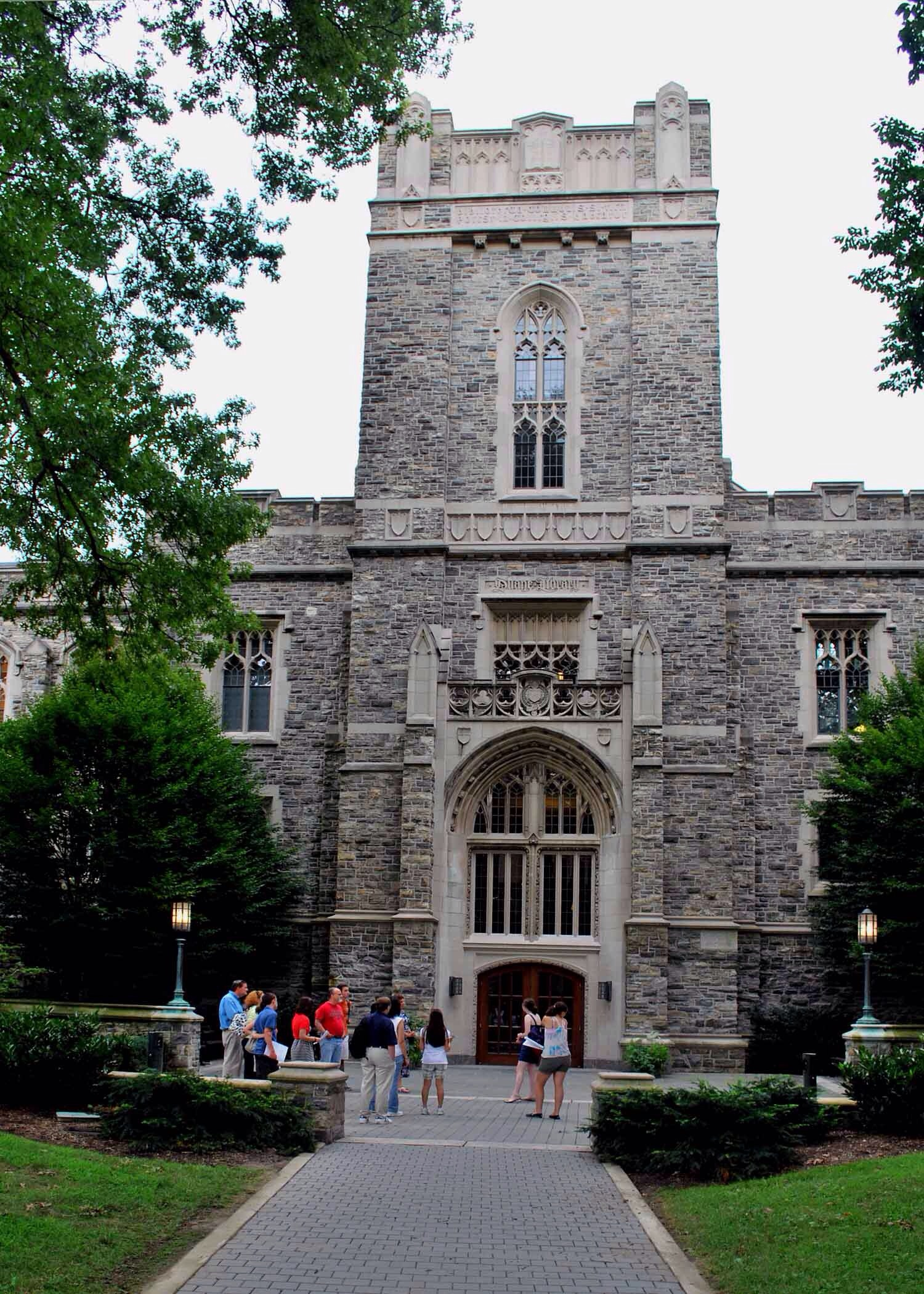
Entrance to Duane Library

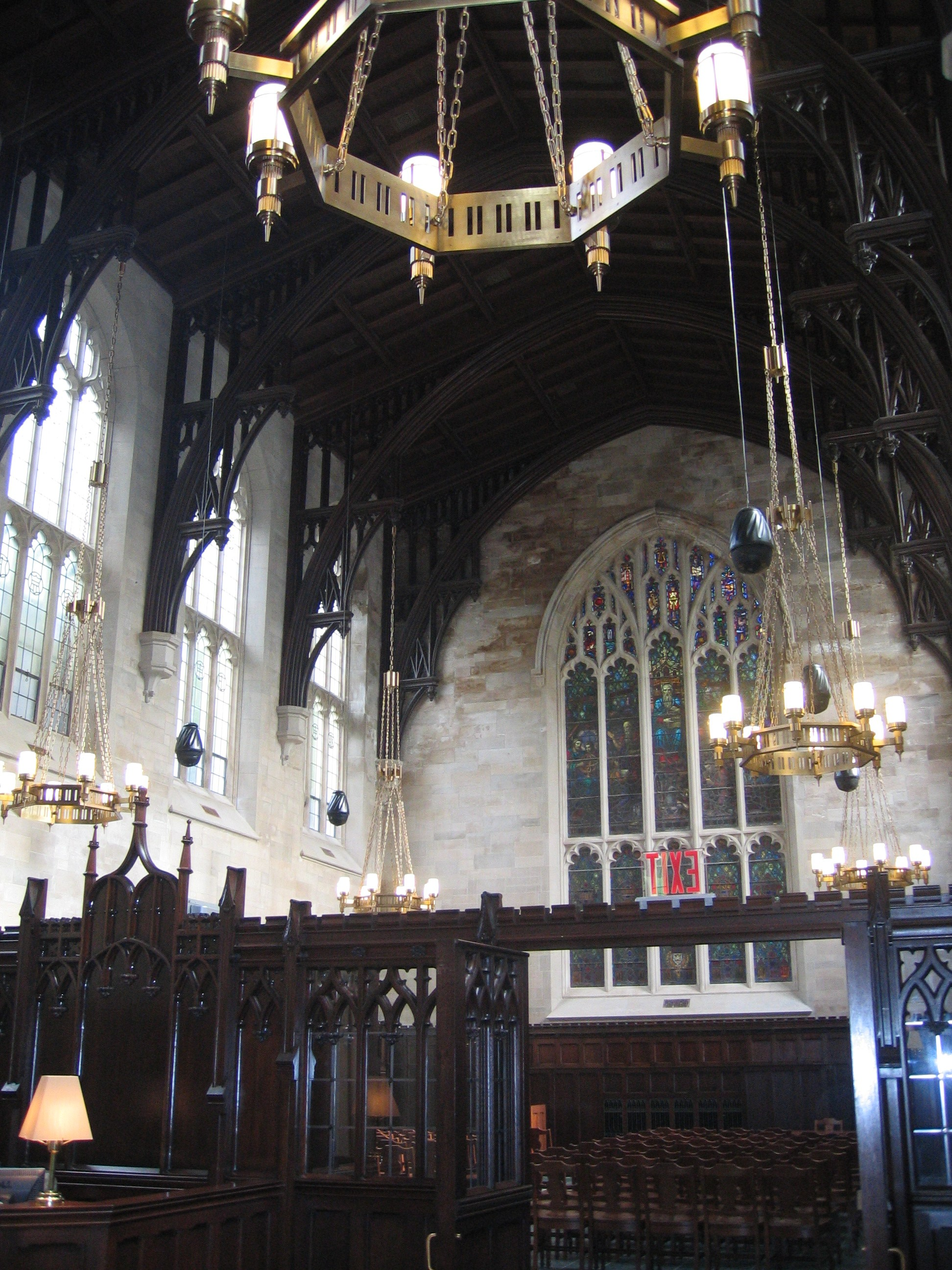
Interior of Duane Library

== See also ==
- William D. Walsh Family Library
