= Fordham University Church =

Catholic (Jesuit) church at Fordham University in New York City, USA

Coordinates: 40.8636°N 73.8863°W

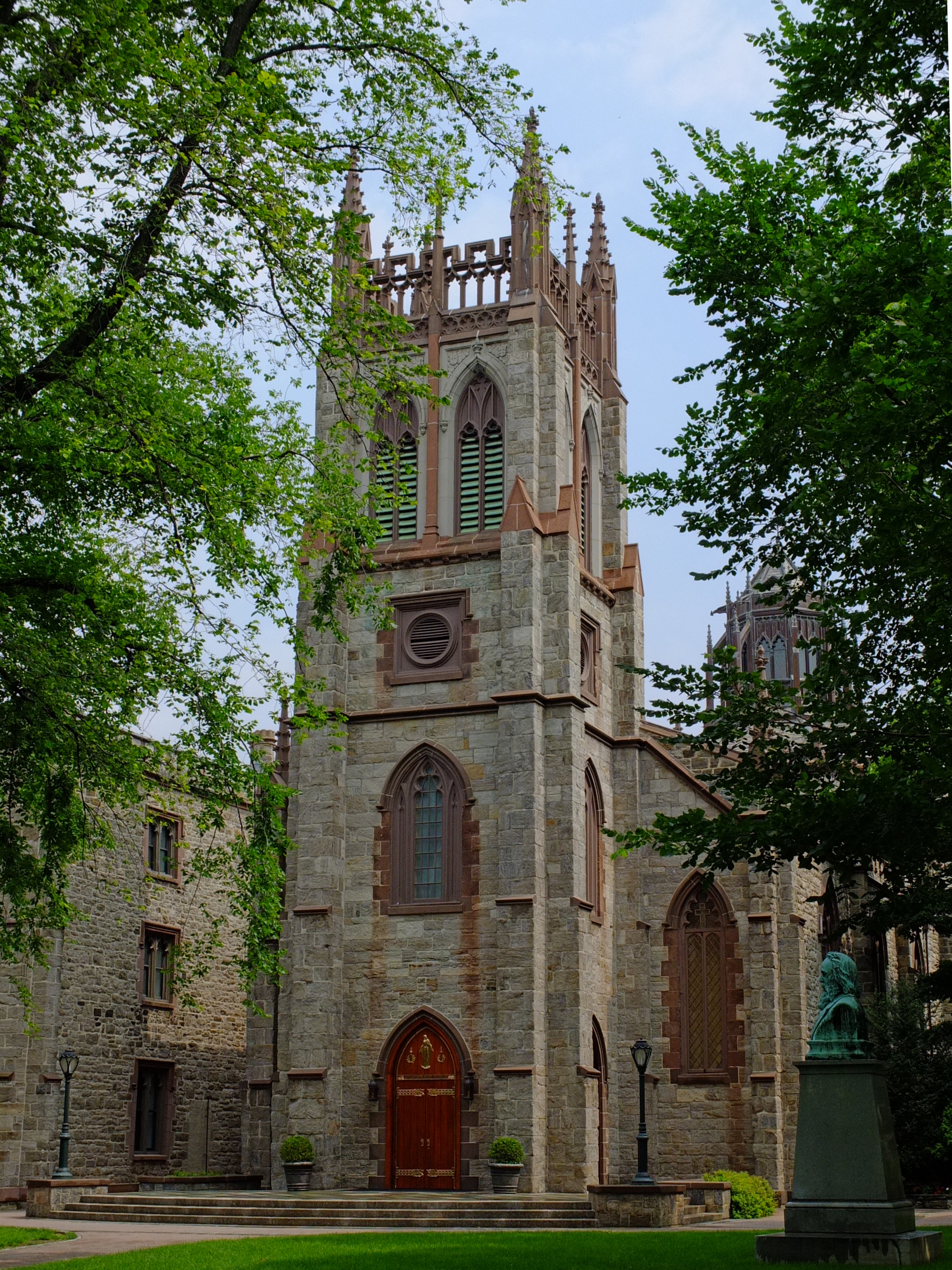
- Interactive map of the Fordham University Church area

General information
- Architectural style: Collegiate Gothic
- Location: Fordham University, The Bronx, New York City, New York, U.S.
- Completed: 1845

Design and construction
- Architect: Rev. James Roosevelt Bayley

Other information
- Seating capacity: 1,200

The Fordham University Church is a Catholic (Jesuit) church located at Fordham University in the Bronx, New York City. Originally constructed in 1845, the church was initially used as a seminary for the community, and later became part of the university in 1859. Contemporarily, it is the central place of worship and head of the university's campus ministry, which also has various associated chapels across the university's three campuses.

== History ==
=== Establishment ===
The Fordham University Church was originally built in 1845 as a seminary chapel and parish church for the surrounding community of Old Fordham Village in The Bronx. In 1859, the university was purchased by the Jesuits, and the church was absorbed by the university (then St. John's College).

It contains the old altar from the current St. Patrick's Cathedral, as well as stained glass windows given to the university by King Louis Philippe I of France. The windows are particularly notable for their connection to a workshop in Sevres, France, where the earliest stages of the Gothic Revival took place. The six windows in the nave of the University Church depict the Four Evangelists, St. Peter, and St. Paul.

Adjacent to the church is the Fordham University Cemetery, where the university's original nineteenth-century Jesuits, diocesan seminarians, students, and workers are interred; the original cemetery had been located on property that now belongs to the New York Botanical Garden, and the graves were relocated to their current location in 1890.

=== Campus ministry ===
The University Church is the central place of worship for Fordham's campus ministry; however, there are numerous chapels associated with the church on the Rose Hill campus, including the Blue Chapel in Keating Hall, the Sacred Heart Chapel in Dealy Hall, and the St. Robert Bellarmine Chapel at Spillman Hall. Additionally, the Our Lady's Chapel is located in the University Church basement.

== Gallery ==
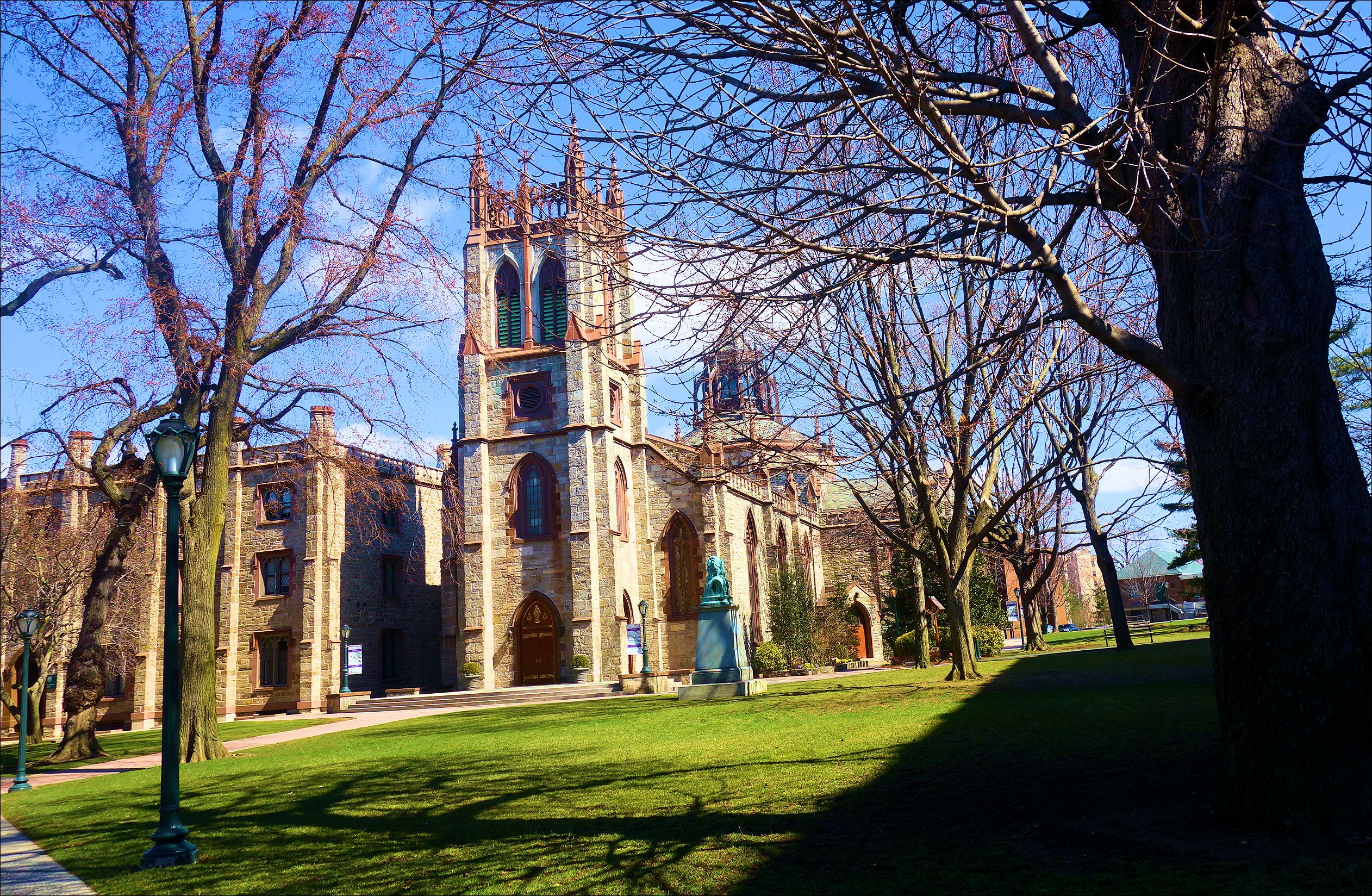
Church with statue of Orestes Brownson in the foreground.

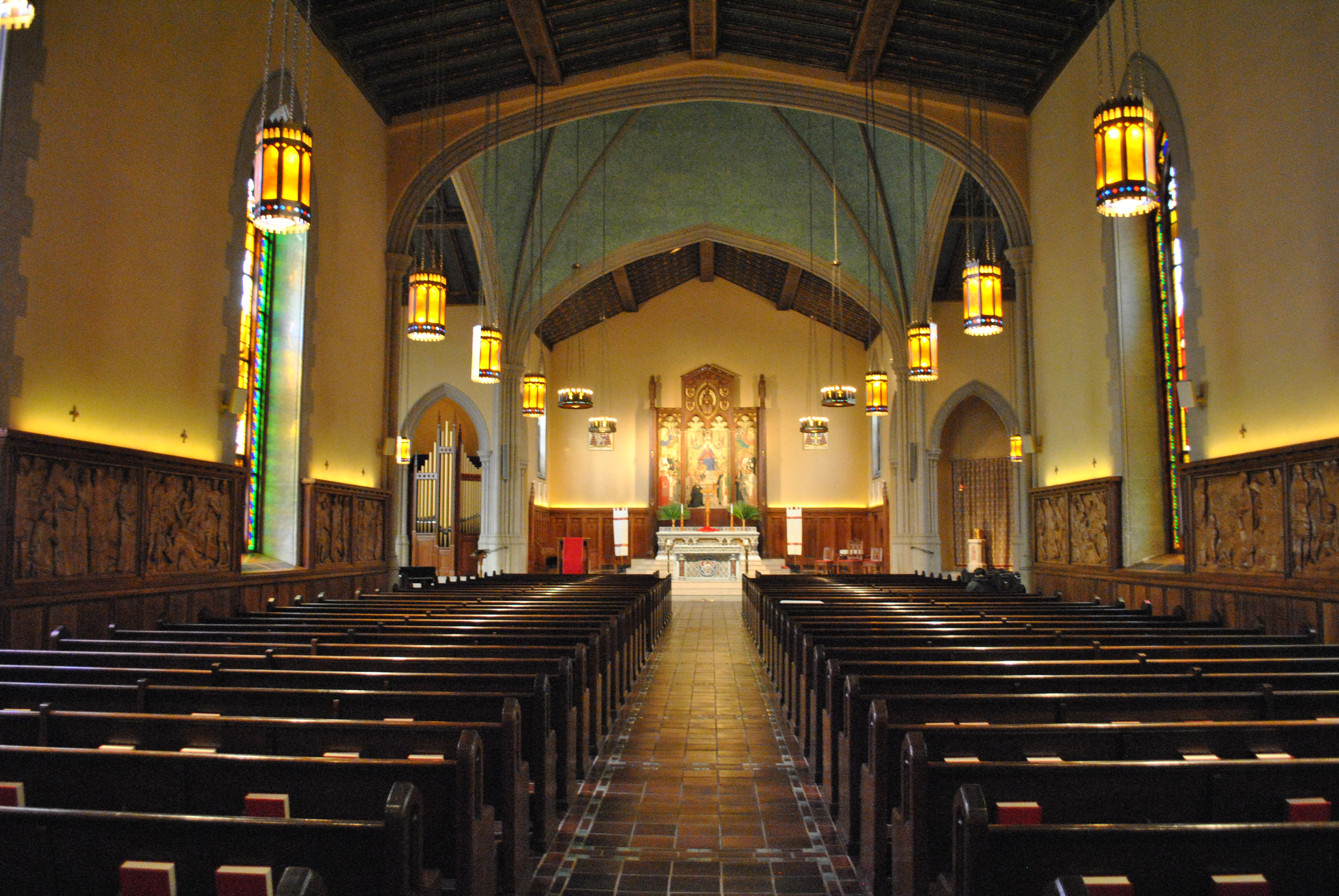
Interior of the University Church

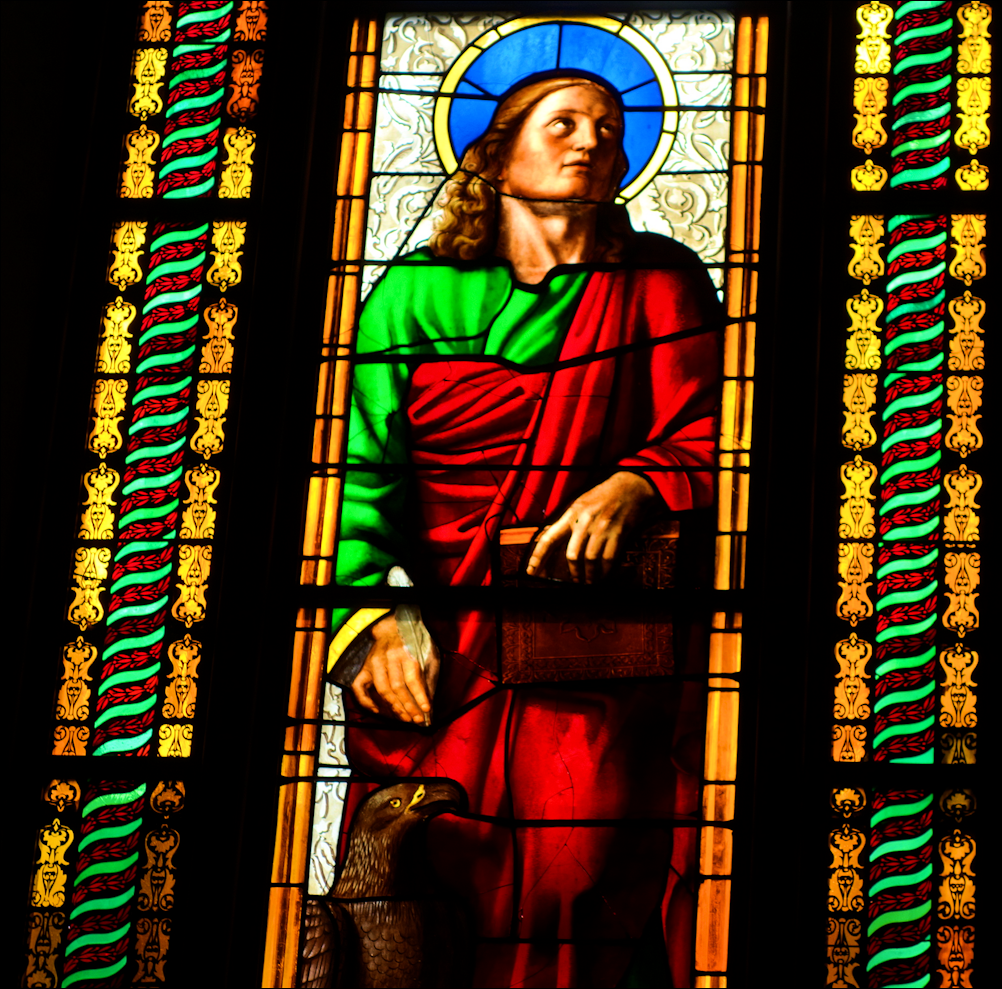
A window in the church, donated by King Louis Philippe I of France.

== See also ==
- List of Jesuit sites

== Notes and references ==
=== References ===
- Schroth, Raymond A. (2008). Fordham: A History and Memoir (Revised ed.). New York: Fordham University Press. ISBN 978-0-823-22977-2.
