= William Spain Seismic Observatory, Fordham University =

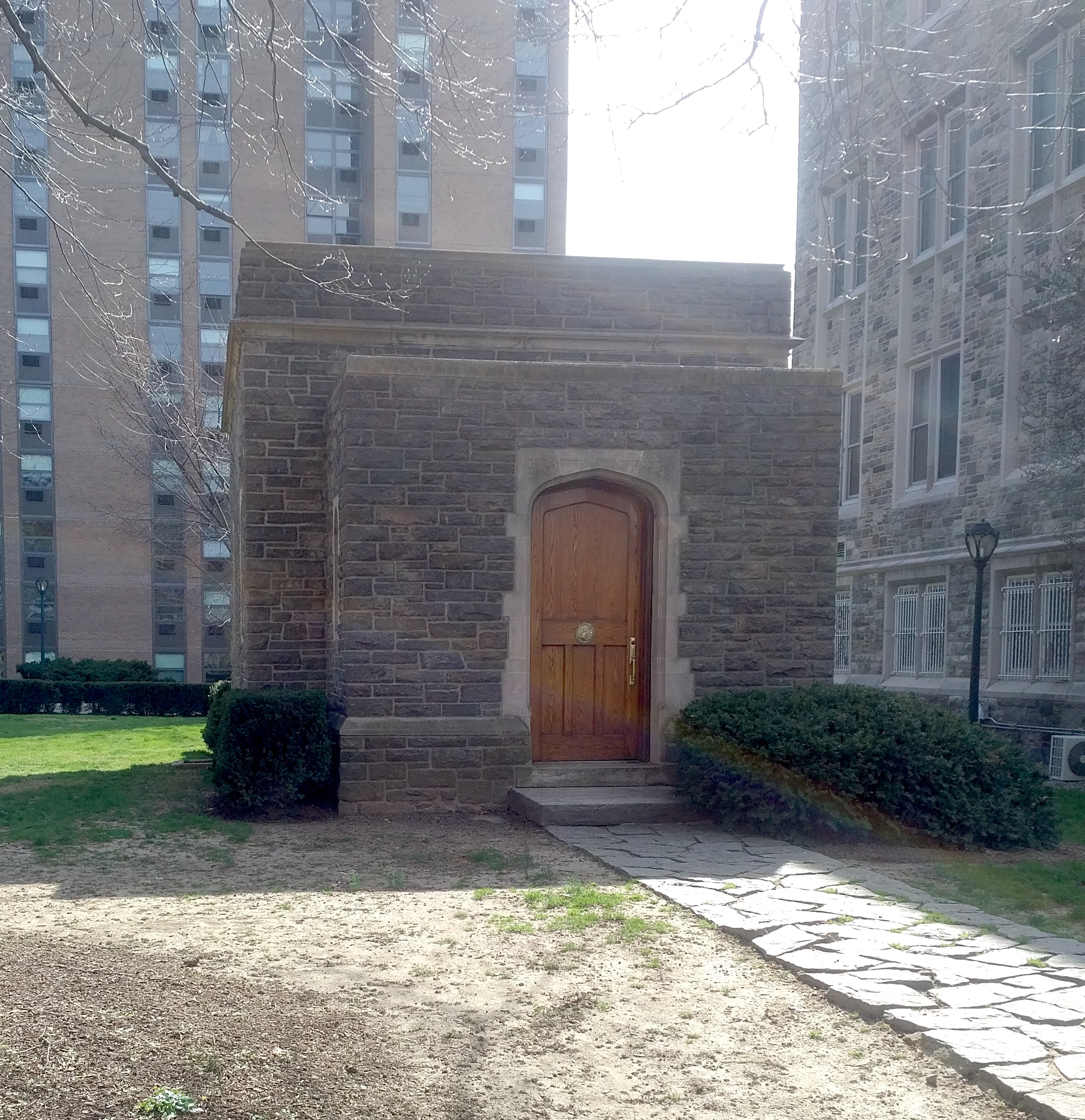
William Spain Seismic Observatory

The William Spain Seismic Observatory is located at the Rose Hill Campus of Fordham University in the Bronx, New York The seismic recordings from this location are the oldest in the region and among the oldest in the United States. It is named for a student who died unexpectedly. A plaque of St. Emidio, patron saint of earthquakes, hangs on the door of the observatory building.
