= William D. Walsh Family Library =

Library at Fordham University in New York

Coordinates: 40°51′40.5″N 73°53′21.3″W

The William D. Walsh Family Library
- Campus side
- Location: Rose Hill campus, Fordham University, The Bronx, New York City, New York, U.S., United States
- Established: 1997

Collection
- Size: 1 million volumes

Other information
- Website: https://www.fordham.edu/resources/libraries/

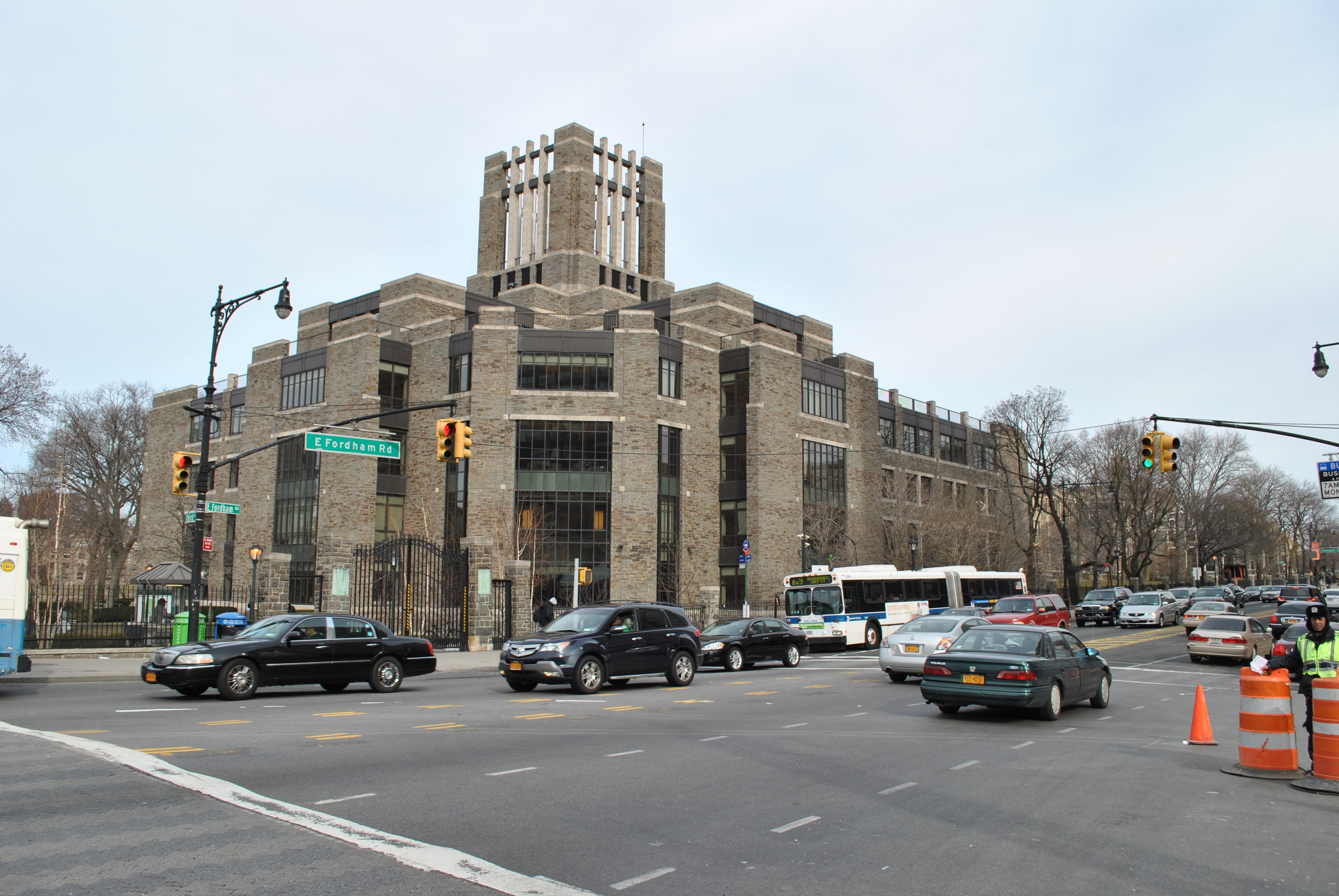
Street side

The William D. Walsh Family Library is a library located at Fordham University's Rose Hill Campus in the Bronx, New York City. In its 2004 edition of The Best 351 Colleges, the Princeton Review ranked Fordham's William D. Walsh Family Library fifth in the country, ahead of Yale, Harvard, and Columbia.

== History ==
The William D. Walsh Family Library was officially opened in 1997 after Duane Library, the original university library, was unable to hold the increase in volumes. After the completion of the Walsh Family Library, the Duane Library was officially closed to students and faculty and sat empty until its 2004 renovation into a visitors' center and headquarters of the theology department.

== Volumes and collections ==
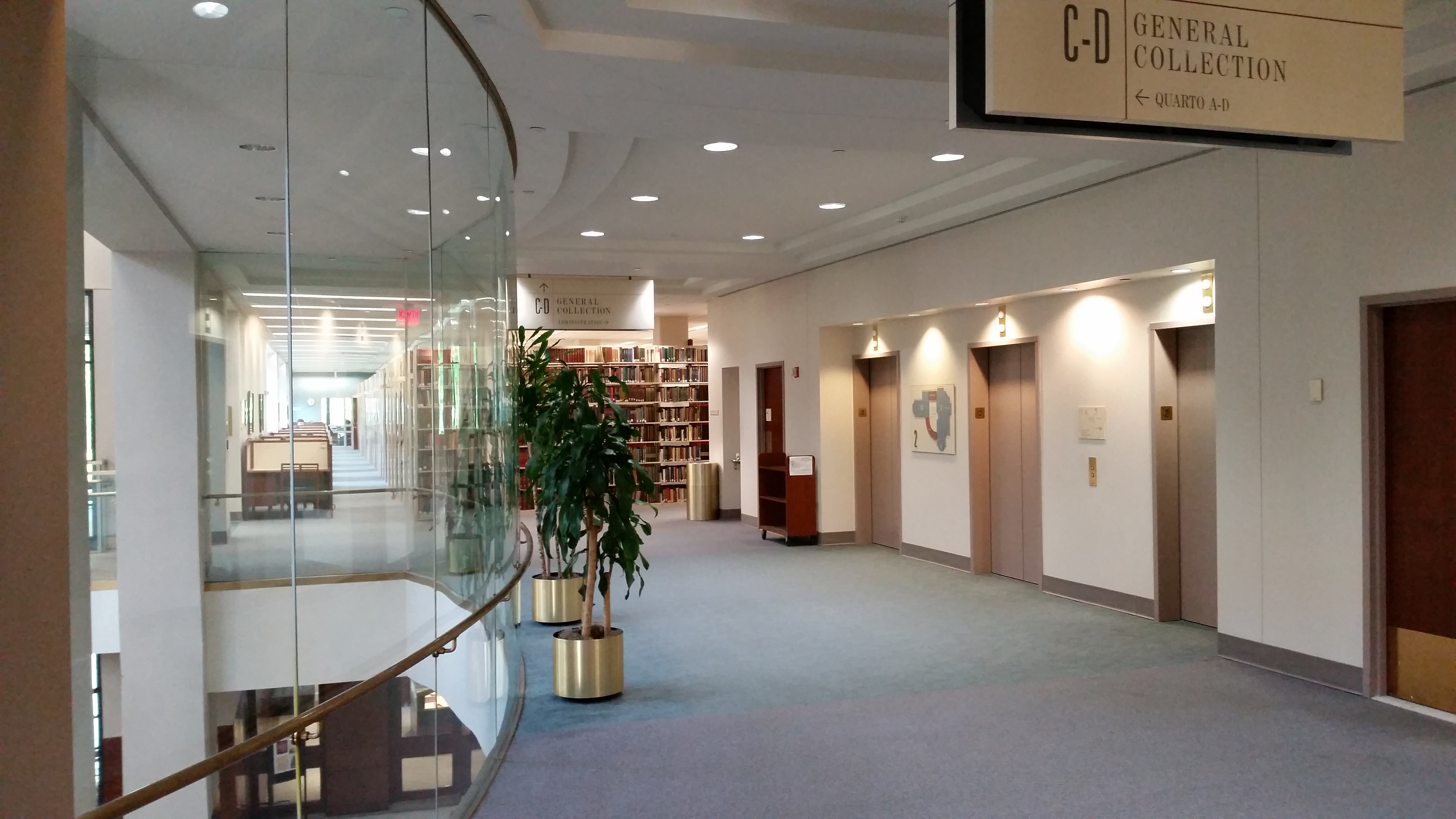
Second floor lobby of the library

The library occupies over 240,000 square feet (22,000 m^{2}) on five floors, and contains more than 1 million volumes and 380,000 U.S. government documents. The Walsh Family Library is named after William Walsh, a Fordham alumnus who made a major contribution toward its construction. All Rose Hill Library services, including the Science Library, Audio Visuals, Electronic Services, Government Documents, Archives, Special Collections, Microforms, and Fordham Dissertations are housed here.

=== Museum of Greek, Etruscan and Roman Art ===
Since 2007 it also houses the Fordham Museum of Greek, Etruscan and Roman Art. The museum showcases a collection of over 200 Greek, Etruscan, and Roman art pieces donated by William Walsh, which he and his wife, Jane, acquired through public art auctions. The museum also showcases a collection of 732 ancient coins given by Thomas Maroney, and Byzantine mosaics anonymously donated in 2013.

== Works cited ==
- Schroth, Raymond A. (2008). Fordham: A History and Memoir (Revised ed.). New York: Fordham University Press. ISBN 978-0-823-22977-2.
- Shelley, Thomas J. (2016). Fordham, A History of the Jesuit University of New York: 1841-2003. New York: Fordham University Press.
