= Fordham Graduate School of Arts and Sciences =

Graduate school in New York City

Coordinates: 40.862040°N 73.885699°W

- Motto: Latin: Sapientia et Doctrina
- Motto in English: Wisdom and Learning
- Type: Private graduate school
- Established: 1916
- Parent institution: Fordham University
- Religious affiliation: Roman Catholic (Jesuit)
- President: Tania Tetlow
- Dean: Ann Gaylin, Ph.D.
- Students: 858 (Fall 2022)
- Location: New York City, New York, United States
- Campus: Urban
- Website: www.fordham.edu/gsas

The Fordham Graduate School of Arts and Sciences (Fordham GSAS) is a graduate school of Fordham University, a private Jesuit research university based in New York City.

Established in 1916, the school provides instruction at two of the school's three campuses in the New York City area— at the university's main campus, Rose Hill, located in the Bronx; and the Lincoln Center, located in Manhattan's Upper West Side. The school offers a wide range of master's programs, doctoral degree programs, and certificates in traditional disciplines in liberal arts and sciences, as well as interdisciplinary programs.

The school stresses the advantage of its multiple identities: a graduate school of arts and sciences, a Catholic university, a Jesuit institution, and a school in New York City.

== History ==
The Graduate School of Arts and Sciences was established at Fordham University in 1916, as well as a teachers college. Originally, the GSAS was housed in the Woolworth Building in Manhattan, and offered only eight courses, mainly anchored around philosophy and literature. The school was led by three Jesuits; Michael J. Mahoney, J.F.X. Murphy, and Terence J. Shealy; as well as one lay instructor, Condé B. Pallen. By 1920, the school employed a total of sixteen faculty members, and offered Master of Arts, Master of Science, Master of Philosophy, Licentiate of Philosophy, and Doctoral degrees. In 1921, the GSAS was reorganized into the modern departmental system it bears today. In 1933, a psychology department was introduced into the GSAS

In 1936, upon the completion of Keating Hall, the GSAS administrative headquarters were officially relocated to Keating. The same year, Hilaire Belloc joined the faculty, followed by Dietrich von Hildebrand in 1940, the latter of whom taught philosophy. Psychologist Anne Anastasi joined the faculty of the psychology department in 1947, and was the fourth woman to join the Fordham GSAS faculty. In 1967, Dr. Arthur Wayne Brown, a scholar in English literature, became the dean of the GSAS, and established two new Masters programs, in International Political Economy and Development, and Medieval Studies, the former of which would later be inaugurated in the political science department.

After the September 11th attacks, Professor Orlando Rodríguez—the chair of the department of sociology, whose son died in the World Trade Center—began teaching a graduate course on the history of terrorism at the GSAS. In 2008, the Fordham GSAS was selected by the United Nations for membership in its Academic Impact Initiative. Two years later, the university completed construction on a residential cabin for biology graduate students at the Louis Calder Center in Armonk, New York.

== Academics ==
Fordham Graduate School of Arts and Sciences currently offers 24 Master's programs, 10 Doctoral programs, and 9 Advanced Certificates in various disciplines.

== Campus ==
Fordham GSAS is primarily located on Fordham's Rose Hill campus, headquartered in Keating Hall, though some classes are offered at the Lincoln Center campus. Students are offered university housing near campus, but most graduate students find off-campus housing on their own.

== Reputation and rankings ==
Fordham's various graduate programs have also been ranked by the U.S. News & World Report: In 2017, the graduate program of Education was named the 45th best in the United States; its English graduate program was ranked 51st in the nation, while its history and sociology programs were ranked no. 79 and 102, respectively. The graduate program in social work was ranked the 22nd best social work program in the United States, while the university's clinical psychology and psychology programs ranked no. 74 and 141, respectively.

== Notes and references ==
=== References ===
- Schroth, Raymond A. (2008). Fordham: A History and Memoir (Revised ed.). New York: Fordham University Press. ISBN 978-0-823-22977-2.
