= Louis Calder Center =

Biological field station in New York, US

Coordinates: 41.124571°N 73.730297°W

The Louis Calder Center is Fordham University's biological field station. The Calder Center is a protected forest preserve located 30 miles (48 km) north of New York City in Armonk, New York, and is the only full-time ecological research field station in the New York metropolitan area.

== History ==
The Louis Calder Center was founded in 1967 when paper magnate Louis Calder donated his 113-acre (0.46 km^{2}) estate to Fordham University. Buildings have since been constructed, renovated, and modernized.

== Buildings ==
The Louis Calder Center consists of 19 buildings including:

- Calder Hall – A 27-room stone mansion which houses seminar rooms, a library, herbarium, insect collection, guest rooms, kitchen, and dining room.
- McCarthy Laboratories – a building where a great amount of the analysis of samples is carried out. The lab includes growth chambers, a nutrient autoanalyzer, gas chromatograph, HPLC, carbon-nitrogen analyzer, fluorescence and phase microscopes, spectrophotometers, autoclaves, electronic balances, refrigerators, centrifuges, and other scientific equipment.
- Greenhouses
- Lakeside Lodge
- Routh House

== Calder Lake ==
Calder Lake is a 4 hectare mesoeutrophic lake located within the Louis Calder Center. The lake bottom is more than half covered by a submersed macrophyte community, including Vallisneria americana, Elodea canadensis, Potamogeton amplifolius, and Najas flexilis. Since Calder Lake is relatively small, the surrounding flora (including Quercus rubra, Quercus prinus, Acer rubrum, Fagus grandifolia, and Cornus florida) plays a significant role in its ecology, as falling leaves add nutrients to the water. The production rates of bacteria and larger phytoplankton in the lake are limited by the supply of inorganic phosphorus. Dissolved organic carbon exists between 4–6 mg C/L in the lake.
