= Creeden =

Creeden is a surname. Notable people with the surname include:

- Connie Creeden (1915–1969), American baseball player
- John B. Creeden (1871–1948), American Jesuit educator
- Pat Creeden (1906–1992), American baseball player
