= Bill Gannon =

Bill or William Gannon may refer to:

- William F. Gannon (1859–1916), American Catholic priest and Jesuit
- Bill Gannon (baseball) (1873–1927), American baseball player
- Bill Gannon (Gaelic footballer) (1901–1967), Irish Gaelic footballer
- Bill Gannon (Irish republican) (1902–1965), member of the Irish Republican Army
- A fictional character on the American television series Dragnet, played by Harry Morgan
- William J. Gannon (born 1937), American politician in the state of Iowa
- Bill Gannon (New Hampshire politician) (born 1962), New Hampshire politician
