= Brian J. Gareau =

Environmental sociologist

- Born: November 8, 1973 (age 52)
- Occupations: Sociologist; academic administrator

Academic background
- Education: Providence College (B. A.); Washington State University (M. S.); University of California, Santa Cruz (M. A., PhD)

Academic work
- Discipline: Sociology
- Sub-discipline: Environmental sociology; global environmental governance; rural sociology; agri-food studies
- Institutions: Boston College
- Notable works: From Precaution to Profit; Organic Futures; Environments, Natures and Social Theory

Brian J. Gareau (born November 8, 1973) is an environmental sociologist at Boston College whose scholarship concerns global environmental governance, ozone layer protection, climate change, social theory, and agri-food systems. His books include From Precaution to Profit, Environments, Natures and Social Theory, and Organic Futures, which have been reviewed in academic journals including the American Journal of Sociology, Social Forces, Rural Sociology, Society & Natural Resources, and the Journal of Design History. At Boston College, he is a professor of sociology and senior associate dean for faculty affairs and academic planning in the Morrissey College of Arts & Sciences.

== Education and career ==
Gareau received a B.A. from Providence College, an M.S. from Washington State University, and an M.A. and Ph.D. from the University of California, Santa Cruz.

At Boston College, Gareau has held appointments in sociology and international studies. From 2018 to 2023, he served as associate dean for the University Core Curriculum. In 2023 he was named senior associate dean for faculty affairs and academic planning in the Morrissey College of Arts & Sciences.

== Books and reception ==
Gareau's scholarship has examined the political economy of global environmental agreements, the relationship between scientific knowledge and policy-making, and the governance of agri-food systems.

=== From Precaution to Profit ===
Gareau's book From Precaution to Profit: Contemporary Challenges to Environmental Protection in the Montreal Protocol was published by Yale University Press in 2013 in the Yale Agrarian Studies Series. The book analyzes disputes over methyl bromide regulation within the Montreal Protocol and argues that neoliberal political-economic pressures and contests over scientific authority weakened environmental protection efforts. It was selected as a 2013 Choice Outstanding Academic Title in International Relations.

The book received reviews in several academic journals. In the American Journal of Sociology, Oriol Mirosa wrote that Gareau's broad treatment of global environmental governance, ozone-depleting chemicals, diplomatic meetings, California agriculture, non-governmental organizations, production processes, discourse, and knowledge formation was central to the book's account of the Montreal Protocol's methyl bromide controversy. Mirosa described the book's main contribution as bringing together dimensions of global governance that are usually treated separately. In Social Forces, Wesley Longhofer described the book's ethnographic analysis of how science, politics, and market interests interacted in Montreal Protocol negotiations as "top notch" and wrote that its theoretical contributions were "subtle yet novel".

Daniel Aldana Cohen's review in the Journal of World-Systems Research described the book as using ethnographic and historical research to show how global inequalities and state-business relations shaped Montreal Protocol negotiations, while also raising questions about the book's periodization of neoliberal environmental governance. In the Journal of Political Ecology, Deborah Scott described the book as a cautionary account of international environmental governance under neoliberalism and emphasized its treatment of science and knowledge within environmental treaty-making. In Rural Sociology, Chris R. Colocousis called the book timely for debates over environmental governance and climate policy, while also criticizing aspects of its organization and execution. David Downie reviewed the book in Global Environmental Politics. Choice rated the book "Essential" for upper-division undergraduate, graduate, research, and professional collections.

=== Environments, Natures and Social Theory ===
With Damian F. White and Alan P. Rudy, Gareau co-authored Environments, Natures and Social Theory: Towards a Critical Hybridity, published by Palgrave Macmillan in its Themes in Social Theory series. The book surveys environmental social theory, ecological politics, and approaches to nature-society relations.

In Society & Natural Resources, Jeff Rose described the book as an interdisciplinary engagement with social theories informing environmental politics, management, and ethics, and wrote that it provided a broad typology of perspectives and discourses in ecological politics. Rose also wrote that researchers across environmentally focused social science fields would find the book useful for situating research within critical socioenvironmental theory. Cameron Tonkinwise reviewed the book in the Journal of Design History, situating it in relation to sustainable design, strategic design, and debates over the social dimensions of environmental problems. In Antipode, Harold A. Perkins described the book as well suited to graduate teaching on nature and social theory and identified its discussion of global environmental governance and the Montreal Protocol as a particularly developed part of the text.

=== Organic Futures ===
With Connor J. Fitzmaurice, Gareau co-authored Organic Futures: Struggling for Sustainability on the Small Farm, published by Yale University Press in 2016 in the Yale Agrarian Studies Series. The book uses ethnographic research on a New England organic farm to examine the relationship between sustainability, markets, and small-scale agriculture.

The book was reviewed in Agriculture and Human Values, Rural Sociology, and Society & Natural Resources. In Rural Sociology, Alanna K. Higgins described the book as a well-constructed contribution to social, political, and economic questions about food-system alternatives and emphasized its ethnographic treatment of small-scale organic farmers. The Rural Sociology review also concluded that the book's ethnographic data and farm vignettes helped advance academic and practitioner discussions of alternative agriculture. William Grady Holt's review in Society & Natural Resources described the book as more than a single-farm case study, emphasizing how it connected farm-level experience to organic farming policy, market changes, and broader issues in organic production.

== Other research ==
Gareau has also published articles on environmental governance, rural sociology, and climate change. His earlier articles include work in Rural Sociology, Antipode, Environment and Planning A, and Environmental Politics on conservation, the Montreal Protocol, and global environmental governance. Later work has examined climate change and cranberry production in New England, including articles in PLOS ONE, Climatic Change, the Journal of Rural Studies, and PLOS Climate.

== Selected works ==
- Gareau, Brian J. From Precaution to Profit: Contemporary Challenges to Environmental Protection in the Montreal Protocol. New Haven: Yale University Press, 2013.
- White, Damian F.; Rudy, Alan P.; and Brian J. Gareau. Environments, Natures and Social Theory: Towards a Critical Hybridity. London: Palgrave Macmillan, 2015.
- Fitzmaurice, Connor J., and Brian Gareau. Organic Futures: Struggling for Sustainability on the Small Farm. New Haven: Yale University Press, 2016.
