= Thomas I. Gasson =

American Jesuit educator

The Reverend Thomas I. Gasson
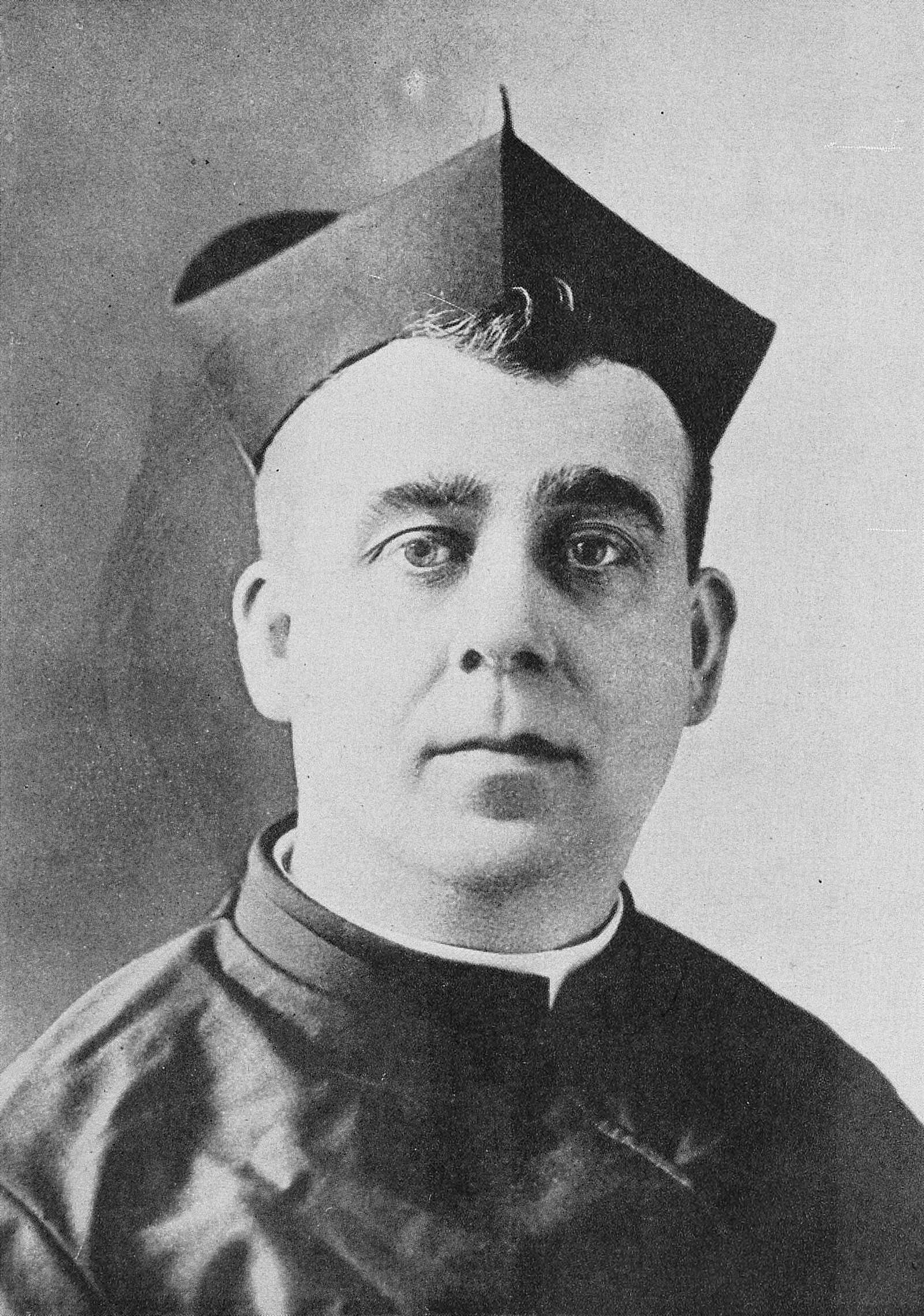
- Portrait of Thomas I. Gasson

13th President of Boston College
- In office 1907–1914
- Preceded by: William F. Gannon
- Succeeded by: Charles W. Lyons

Personal details
- Born: September 23, 1859 Sevenoaks, Kent, England
- Died: February 27, 1930 (aged 70) Montreal, Quebec, Canada
- Education: University of Innsbruck

Orders
- Ordination: July 26, 1891 by Simon Aichner

Thomas Ignatius Gasson (September 23, 1859 – February 27, 1930) was an American Catholic priest and Jesuit. Born in England, he emigrated to the United States at the age of 13, and was taken under the care of two Catholic women in Philadelphia, which led to his conversion to Catholicism soon thereafter. He entered the Society of Jesus in 1875, and studied theology at the University of Innsbruck in Austria, where he was ordained a priest. Upon his return to the United States, he became a professor at Boston College, before being named President of Boston College in 1907.

As president, he initiated the college's relocation from the South End of Boston to a new campus in Chestnut Hill, Massachusetts that he purchased. He oversaw the construction of the new campus' first building, the recitation hall, which was later named Gasson Hall. For this, he became known as Boston College's "second founder." His tenure came to an end in 1914, and he moved first to Maryland and then to Georgetown University, where he served as graduate dean for sociology for nine years. He then briefly led the Manresa Institute on Staten Island, before being stationed at Loyola College in Montreal, where he died in 1930.

== Early life ==
Thomas Ignatius Gasson was born on September 23, 1859, in Sevenoaks, Kent in England. His ancestry on his father's side was French Huguenot, while that on his mother's side was a longtime family of Kent, which produced several rectors of St. Nicholas Church in Sevenoaks. He was sent to St. Stephen's School in London, before immigrating to the United States in 1872. He had little money or belongings, and sustained himself as an errand boy. Though he had intended to live in Philadelphia with his older brother, he was taken under the care of two Catholic women. They had him instructed in the Catholic faith, and on October 5, 1874, he was formally received into the Catholic Church at the Chapel of the Holy Family in Philadelphia (later known as the Church of the Gesú).

=== Education and early career ===
Shortly thereafter, he entered the Society of Jesus on November 7, 1875. While preparing to be ordained a priest, he was sent to teach at St. Francis Xavier College in New York City. He then returned to Europe to study theology at the University of Innsbruck in Austria. He was ordained a priest on July 26, 1891, by Simon Aichner, the Prince-Bishop of Brixen, in the university church. The following year, he continued his theological studies, and also served as chaplain at a charitable institution in the city of Innsbruck.

Gasson returned to the United States in the summer of 1892. He taught poetry to students in Frederick, Maryland, for two years, before beginning his study of ascetical theology for one year. Upon completion of his studies, he was made a professor of ethics and economics at Boston College in August 1895.

== President of Boston College ==
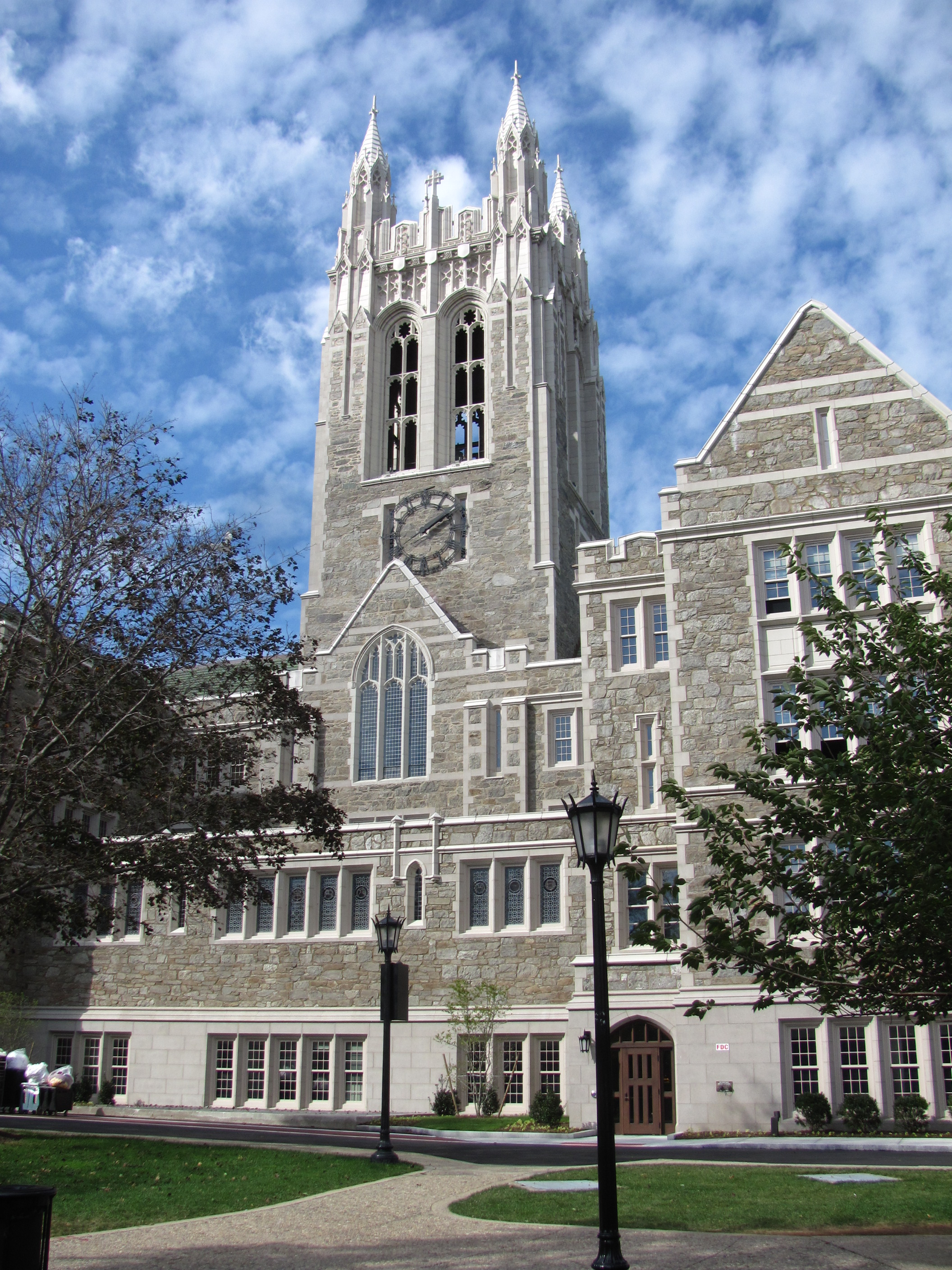
Gasson oversaw construction of the recitation building, today known as Gasson Hall

=== Construction of a new campus ===
Gasson was appointed President of Boston College on January 6, 1907, succeeding William F. Gannon. He simultaneously served as pastor of the Church of the Immaculate Conception in the South End of Boston. Just two months after his inauguration, he suggested to the Jesuit provincial superior that Boston College might inquire into purchasing a tract of land, including the farm of Amos Adams Lawrence, on Commonwealth Avenue near the Brighton neighborhood of Boston and relocate the school from the South End. In furtherance of this goal, he announced to alumni in May 1907 that he aimed to relocate the college and construct a new campus; this would require $10 million. On November 11, 1907, the Boston College board of trustees settled on a specific parcel of land in Chestnut Hill, Massachusetts, and voted to purchase it. This was quickly followed by purchases of adjacent lands.

On January 25, 1909, he convened a competition of architects to design new buildings for the site. The winning design called for 15 buildings in the English Gothic style and sports fields. Gasson broke ground on the centerpiece of the plan, the recitation building, on June 19, 1909. Construction of the building was slow and inhibited by lack of funds; as a result, Gasson sold a portion of the land previously purchased, to finance the building. The recitation building finally opened for class on March 28, 1913. That year, he purchased the bells to hang in the building's tower. The recitation building later came to be known as Gasson Hall. For his establishment of the college in its new location, Gasson became known as Boston College's "second founder."

=== Graduate curriculum ===
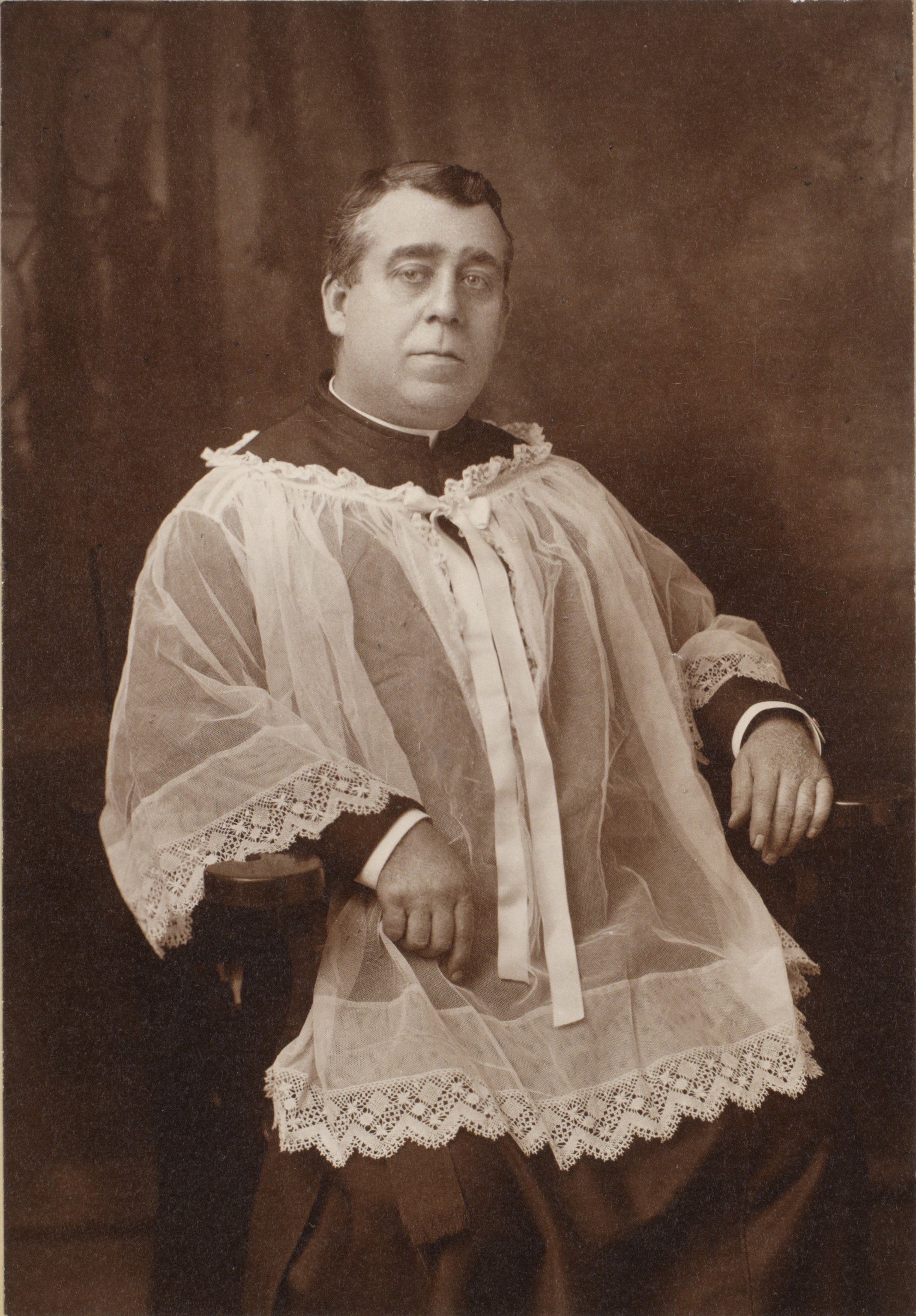
Thomas Gasson circa 1910

Several Catholic laymen sought to establish a graduate night school in Catholic philosophy. In response, Gasson opened a graduate department in December 1912, which provided lectures on philosophy, literature, and professional ethics. The following year, it began granting master's degrees. This program was disestablished shortly after the end of his presidency in 1914. Gasson's term as president came to an end on January 11, 1914, and he was succeeded by Charles W. Lyons.

== Later years ==
Following the end of his presidency, Gasson moved to the Jesuit retirement home in Woodstock, Maryland. Five months later, he was transferred to Georgetown University in Washington, D.C., where he worked various jobs, including serving as the graduate dean of sociology from 1914 to 1923. In the summer of 1920, he was sent to Rome to represent the Jesuit Maryland-New York Province at the provincial congregation. He then briefly returned to Georgetown before becoming the rector of the Manresa Institute, a Jesuit retreat house on Staten Island in New York City. One year later, he was transferred to Loyola College in Montreal, Quebec.

Gasson became ill and underwent surgery. He died on February 27, 1930. Upon his death, The Stylus of Boston College compiled eulogies of him by such people as the Mayor of Boston, John F. Fitzgerald; the President of Boston University, Lemuel Herbert Murlin; and The Boston Post.

Academic offices
Preceded by William F. Gannon	13th President of Boston College; 1907–1914	Succeeded by Charles W. Lyons
Catholic Church titles
Preceded by William F. Gannon	14th Pastor of the Church of the Immaculate Conception; 1907–1914	Succeeded by Charles W. Lyons
