= J. Charles Davey =

American Jesuit educator

The Reverend J. Charles Davey

12th President of Saint Joseph's College
- In office 1914–1917
- Preceded by: Charles W. Lyons
- Succeeded by: Redmond J. Walsh

Personal details
- Born: September 19, 1869 Brooklyn, New York, U.S.
- Died: November 4, 1935 (aged 66) Philadelphia, Pennsylvania, U.S.
- Education: St. Francis Xavier College (B.A., M.A.); Woodstock College

Orders
- Ordination: 1908

J. Charles Davey (September 19, 1869 – November 4, 1935) was an American Catholic priest and Jesuit who became the President of Saint Joseph's College in Philadelphia. Born in Brooklyn, New York, he was educated at St. Francis Xavier College in New York City, before entering the Society of Jesus and studying at Woodstock College in Maryland. He then taught at what later became known as Brooklyn Preparatory School and at Saint Joseph's College, before being appointed president of Saint Joseph's in 1914. He remained for three years, and then became the dean of Gonzaga College High School in Washington, D.C., for ten years. He spent time at Saint Peter's College in New Jersey, before returning to Philadelphia, where he died.

== Early life ==
Davey was born on September 19, 1869, in the city of Brooklyn, in New York State. (Note: The City of Brooklyn was an independently chartered city until its merger into the City of New York in 1898 as a boroughs.) He entered the Society of Jesus on September 7, 1893. He studied at St. Francis Xavier College (later known as Xavier High School) in New York City, where he received a Bachelor of Arts in 1897 and a Master of Arts in 1906. He then studied theology at Woodstock College in Maryland.

=== Teaching ===
Davey taught Latin, Ancient Greek, and English at Saint Joseph's College in Philadelphia from 1901 to 1905. In 1908, he was ordained a priest, and he became the first dean and the vice president of Brooklyn College (later known as Brooklyn Preparatory School). He then spent a year at the Jesuit novitiate of St. Andrew-on-Hudson in Poughkeepsie, New York, before returning to St. Joseph's College as dean and vice president.

In 1912, he became the rector of the Church of the Gesú. Davey was appointed the President of Saint Joseph's College in 1914, succeeding Charles W. Lyons. He held this position until 1917, when he was succeeded by Redmond J. Walsh.

== Later years ==
In 1918, Davey became dean of Gonzaga College High School in Washington, D.C., where he remained for ten years. He was charged with planning the school's centennial celebration, and was moderator of the alumni association. While there, he was the moderator of the Washington Catholic Truth Society and the Catholic Women's Literary Guild. When Saint Joseph's College relocated to its present location, he served as subdeacon in the solemn high mass, which was celebrated by Cardinal Dennis Joseph Dougherty, the Archbishop of Philadelphia, that followed the formal opening of the school on November 13, 1927.

From 1928 to 1933, he served as the dean and treasurer of Saint Peter's College in Jersey City, New Jersey. He then returning to Saint Joseph's College, where he performed pastoral work at Old St. Joseph's Church. He was also a member of the Philadelphia Historical Society. Davey died of pneumonia at St. Joseph's Hospital in Philadelphia on November 4, 1935.

== Notes ==
Academic offices
| Preceded by Charles W. Lyons | 12th President of Saint Joseph's College; 1914–1917 | Succeeded by Redmond J. Walsh |
