= John B. Creeden =

20th-century American Jesuit educator

The Reverend John B. Creeden SJ
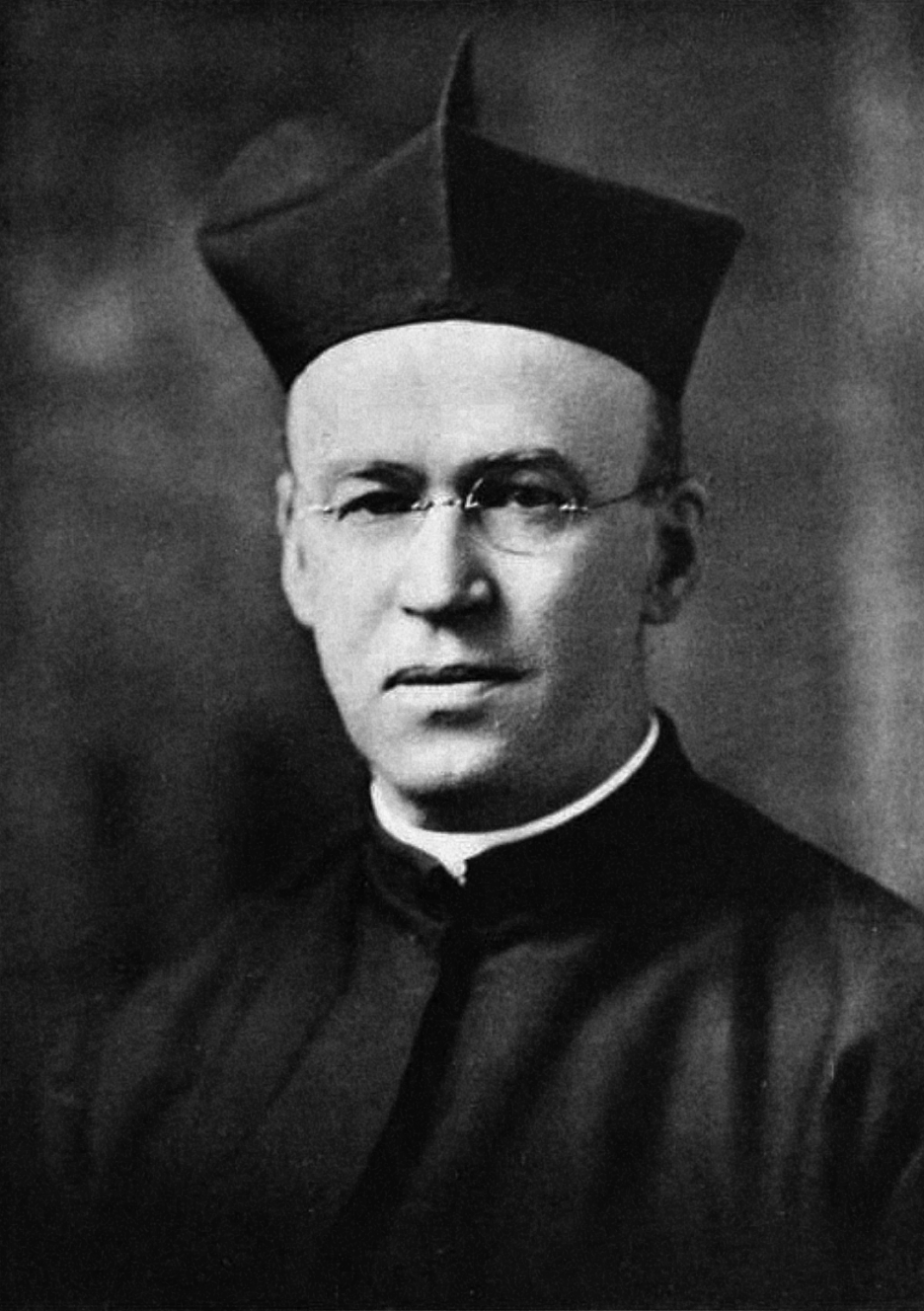
- Creeden in 1922

37th President of Georgetown University
- In office 1918–1924
- Preceded by: Alphonsus J. Donlon
- Succeeded by: Charles W. Lyons

Personal details
- Born: September 12, 1871 Arlington, Massachusetts, U.S.
- Died: February 26, 1948 (aged 76) Boston, Massachusetts, U.S.
- Education: Boston College; Woodstock College

Orders
- Ordination: 1905 by James Gibbons

John Berchmans Creeden SJ (September 12, 1871 – February 26, 1948) was an American Catholic priest and Jesuit, who served in many senior positions at Jesuit universities in the United States. Born in Massachusetts, he attended Boston College, and studied for the priesthood in Maryland and Austria. He taught at Fordham University and then at Georgetown University, where he became the dean of Georgetown College in 1909, and simultaneously served as the principal of Georgetown Preparatory School.

Creeden became president of Georgetown University in 1918, in the aftermath of the First World War. During his presidency, the School of Foreign Service was founded, for which he was awarded the Medal of Public Instruction from the president of Venezuela. In order to support the post-war enrollment boom, he expanded the size of the campus and established the university's first endowment. Creeden also significantly reformed the university's organization, including relocating Georgetown Preparatory School to a new campus, installing Jesuit regents to oversee each of the professional schools, and improving the Law School's curriculum and admissions standards.

In 1924, Creeden returned to Boston College as the dean of the Graduate School of Arts & Sciences, before founding Boston College Law School in 1926 and serving as its first regent until 1939 and simultaneously as the regent of Georgetown Law School from 1929 to 1939. In his final years, he was a spiritual counselor at Jesuit schools in Western Massachusetts, and then became the dean of Boston College's Evening Division, which later became the Woods College of Advancing Studies.

== Early life ==
John Berchmans Creeden was born on September 12, 1871, in Arlington, Massachusetts, to Irish immigrant parents. He attended Boston College, before entering the novitiate of the Society of Jesus in Frederick, Maryland, on August 14, 1890. Creeden taught at Georgetown University from 1897 to 1902, and then returned to Woodstock College to study philosophy and theology; he also spent time studying in Linz, Austria. At Woodstock, he was ordained a priest by Cardinal James Gibbons in 1905.

He then spent two years teaching at Fordham University in New York City. In 1909, he was made athletic director and prefect of studies at Georgetown, before being appointed as the dean of Georgetown College later that year. During part of his tenure as dean, he also served as principal of Georgetown Preparatory School. On February 2, 1910, he was conferred the rank of gradus in the Society of Jesus. Upon being named president of the university, he was succeeded as dean by Edmund A. Walsh.

== President of Georgetown University ==
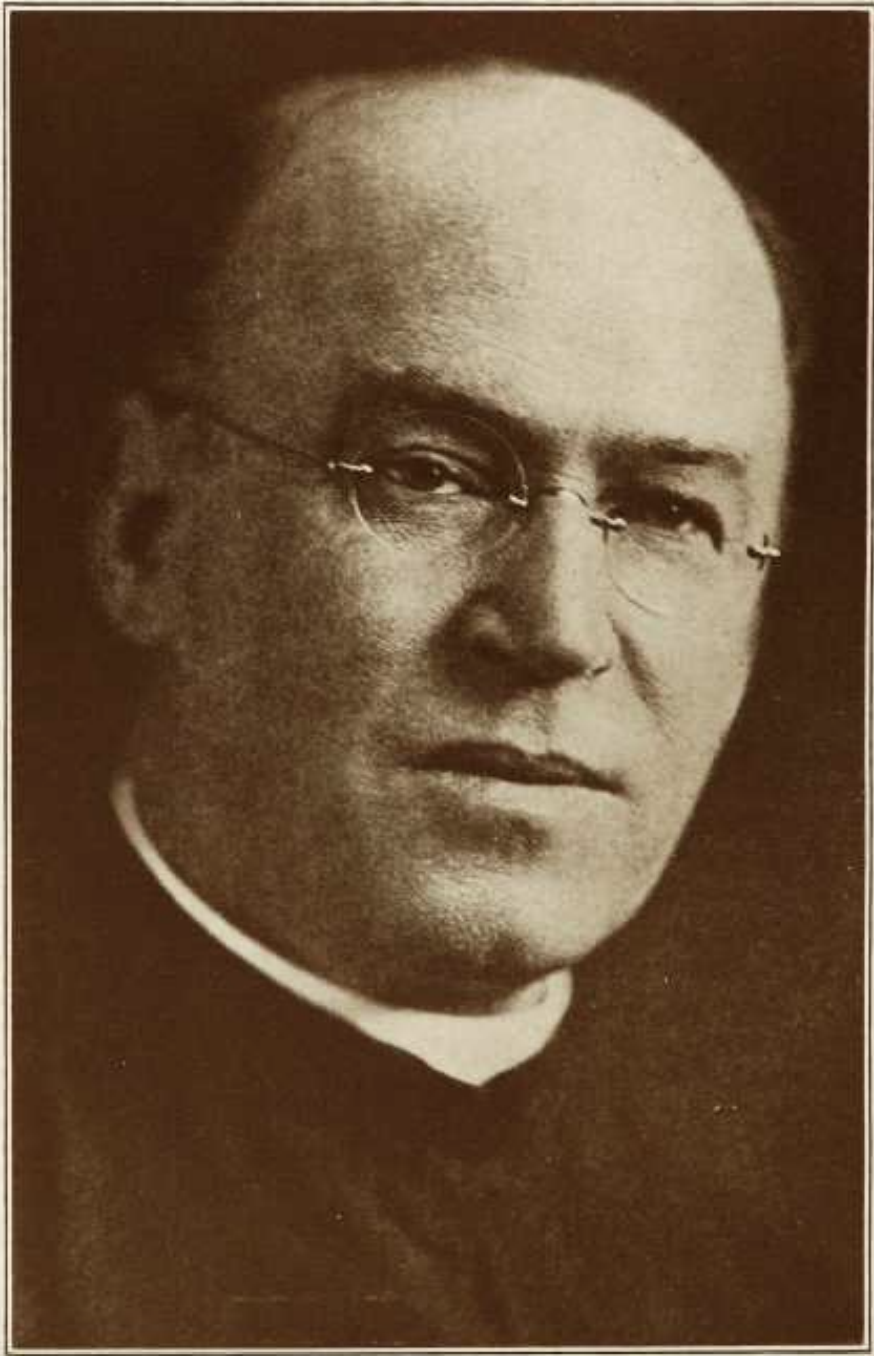
Creeden in 1920

Creeden was named president of Georgetown University in May 1918, succeeding Alphonsus J. Donlon. In 1918, with the Spanish flu making its way toward Washington, Creeden resurrected the St. Joseph's Lamp Association, which had become defunct by the early 1890s. On June 10, 1872, a statue of St. Joseph was erected in the garden of the university infirmary, between Gervase Hall, Mulledy Hall, and Old South. At the ceremony, John McElroy prayed that the university and its infirmary, in particular, be protected by St. Joseph. During 1872 and 1873, Washington, D.C. was afflicted by a measles epidemic. Patients lit a lamp beneath the statue to invoke the saint's intercession. Only a small number of university members contracted the disease, and all survived. In thanks to St. Joseph, students formed the association on February 9, 1874, to keep the lamp burning throughout the year.

On November 20, 1921, Creeden awarded Ferdinand Foch, a French marshal and the Commander-in-Chief of the Allied Armies, an honorary Doctor of Civil and Canon Laws degree, as well as a golden sword on behalf of the American Jesuits.

Creeden voiced his opposition in 1921 to the Smith–Towner Bill, which was an unsuccessful attempt to create the U.S. Department of Education, because he believed it was both unconstitutional and unwise for the federal government to assert control over education. In the summer of 1923, Creeden developed phlebitis, which severely impacted his ability to discharge the office. By early 1924, he felt that he was no longer able to fulfill his duties, and Charles W. Lyons was named as his successor in late October 1924.

=== Campus improvements ===
Following the end of the First World War, enrollment in all of Georgetown's schools increased greatly, especially in the Medical, Dental, and Law Schools. This put the capacity of existing facilities under significant strain. Creeden responded by buying up property bounded by 35th, 37th, P, and N Streets, adjacent to the main campus. He also sought to enhance the national reputation of the university by creating a Georgetown Publicity Bureau. Creeden established an endowment association, whose goal was to raise $5 million in two years, equivalent to $107 million in 2025. This represented the first time in Georgetown's history that an endowment was sought.

The most ambitious of Creeden's visions was a vast expansion of the built campus known as the "Greater Georgetown Plan". This would have involved constructing a new neo-Gothic quadrangle composed of several buildings on the site of the existing athletic field next to Healy Hall. This quadrangle would have been a new home for the Medical and Dental Schools, a dormitory, a classroom building, and a science building. Creeden also planned to build a stadium nearby that could hold twenty thousand spectators. This grand plan never came to fruition because the Depression in 1921 made funding unavailable.

=== Separation of Georgetown Preparatory School ===
At the commencement ceremony of 1919, Creeden announced that Georgetown Preparatory School would move to a separate campus at the start of the following academic year. Construction of the North Bethesda, Maryland, campus was begun under his predecessor, Donlon. The purpose of this relocation was to remove the younger students from what the Jesuits viewed as the indecent temptations of the city. It was also part of the larger movement among Jesuit institutions in the United States, facing pressure from the Association of American Universities, to create separate four-year high school programs and four-year college programs, instead of combined seven-year programs. Despite the school moving away from Georgetown's collegiate campus, Creeden continued to take an active interest in the administration of the preparatory school, frequently visiting and meeting with the headmaster to set policies.

=== School of Foreign Service established ===
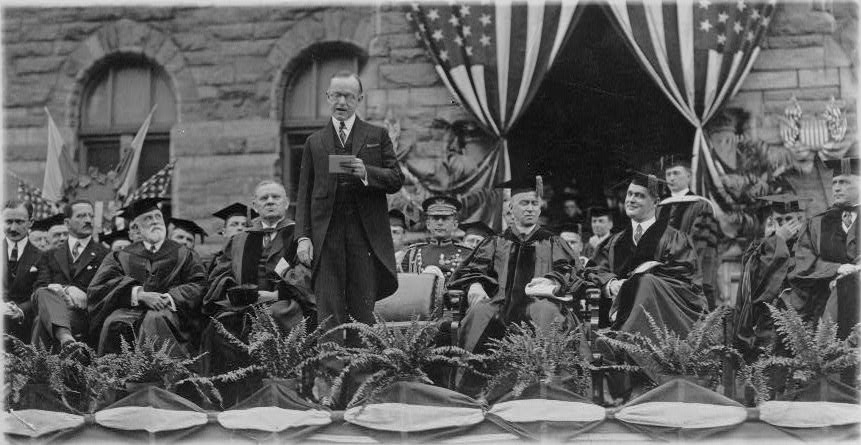
President Calvin Coolidge addressing Georgetown graduates at Healy Hall, with Creeden (center-right) seated with other dignitaries

Following the renaming of Georgetown's School of Foreign Service for Edmund A. Walsh in 1958, Henri J. Wiesel, a Jesuit contemporary and acquaintance of both Creeden and Walsh, wrote to the archivist of Georgetown University; Wiesel stated that although Walsh was instrumental in the creation of the school, the true founder of the School of Foreign Service was Creeden. He said that Creeden envisioned the establishment of such a school and frequently discussed the subject, at a time when Walsh was still studying theology as part of his Jesuit formation. His motivation for creating the school was to bring the Society of Jesus into contact with prominent men in government and finance.

Creeden sought to establish the school at the start of his presidency, but this goal was delayed by the First World War. Another Jesuit contemporary verified that Creeden worked closely with Constantine McGuire, another Jesuit, to present the plan for the School of Foreign Service to the board of regents in June 1918. Opening in 1919, the school quickly became well received in government circles in Washington, and Creeden sought to establish an endowment for it. He recruited Walsh, appointing him as the school's first regent. Creeden believed Walsh's personality was more suited to public life, and put him in charge of recruiting faculty and students and to be the face of the school. In recognition of Creeden's role in the founding of the School of Foreign Service, the president of Venezuela, Victorino Márquez Bustillos, awarded him the Medal of Public Instruction in 1920, Venezuela's highest educational honor bestowed on foreign citizens. He was presented with the award during the Venezuelan Minister of Public Education's visit to Washington.

=== Law School reform ===
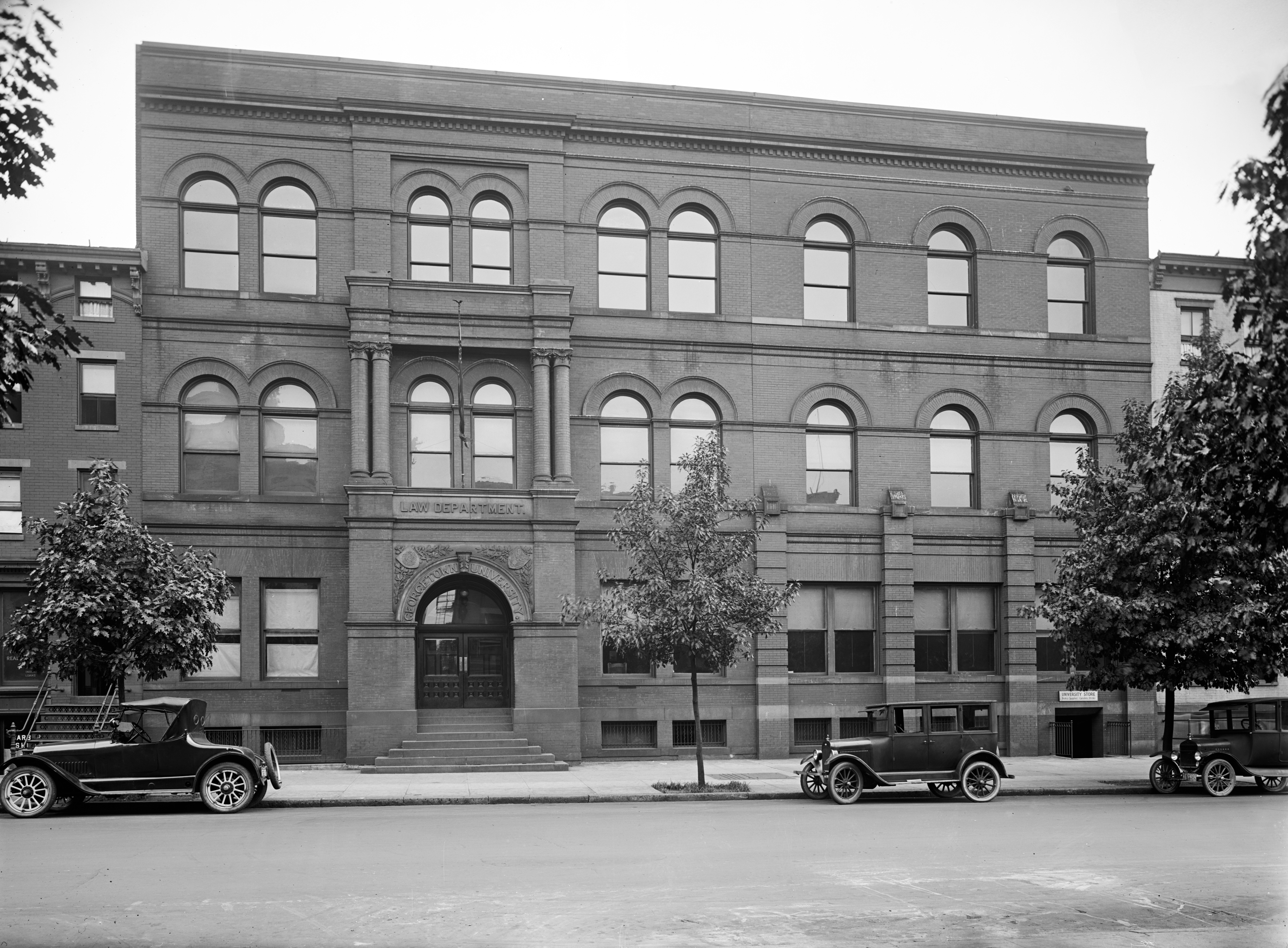
At this time, Georgetown Law School was located in Judiciary Square in downtown Washington.

The Association of American Law Schools (AALS) gave Georgetown Law School a quality rating of B, prompting Creeden to undertake a major reorganization of the governance of the school. In the spring of 1920, he obtained the consent of the board of regents to effectively terminate the semi-autonomous status of the law school, bringing it under closer control of the university leadership. This involved appointing a Jesuit regent to ensure the school was conforming to the tradition and mission of the university (a reform Creeden and a later president, Coleman Nevils, implemented at all of the university's professional schools), and creating an executive faculty that consisted of the president, the dean of the law school, and six professors chosen by the president.

In order to improve the quality of the school, he also had new bylaws adopted, which significantly raised the standards for admission to the law school. Applicants were required to have at least completed four years of high school. By 1925, this standard was raised to require at least two years of college, with courses in history, economics, political science, ethics, logic, and rhetoric. In October 1921, with the support of dean George E. Hamilton, day classes were offered for the first time. Until then, the school offered only evening classes designed for part-time students. Several full-time professors were hired to supplement the part-time faculty that maintained active law practices. Evening students were required to study for four years, instead of the previous three. These reforms resulted in the AALS upgrading Georgetown's rating to an A in 1925. Creeden and other administrators anticipated a decrease in enrollment due to these heightened standards, but this decrease was smaller than expected, and returned to previous levels within several years.

== Later years ==
After leaving Georgetown, Creeden went to Boston College, where he taught philosophy from 1924 to 1926. In 1926, he was appointed to succeed James F. Mellyn as the second dean of the Graduate School of Arts & Sciences, which had been created the previous year. On September 15, 1926, a variety of Boston College's graduate programs, along with its faculty of education, were placed under the purview of the new school. The Graduate School was open to both men and women, was located on Boston College High School's campus, and educated many religious teachers in the Archdiocese of Boston's schools. Creeden remained dean of the Graduate School until 1930, when he was succeeded by John F. Doherty.

Creeden then founded the Boston College Law School, and served as its first regent from 1926 to 1939. At the same time, he became the regent of Georgetown Law School in 1929, and held this position for ten years. Following his law school deanships, he served as spiritual counselor from 1939 to 1942 at Cranwell Preparatory School in Lenox, Massachusetts, and from 1942 to 1947 at Shadowbrook, the Jesuit novitiate in Stockbridge, Massachusetts. He also became the first dean of the Boston College Evening Division, which later became the Woods College of Advancing Studies. On February 26, 1948, Creeden died in Boston.

Academic offices
Preceded by Charles Macksey	33rd Dean of Georgetown College; 1909–1918	Succeeded by Edmund A. Walsh
Preceded by Alphonsus J. Donlon	37th President of Georgetown University; 1918–1924	Succeeded by Charles W. Lyons
Preceded by James F. Mellyn	2nd Dean of the Boston College Graduate School of Arts & Sciences; 1926–1930	Succeeded by John F. Doherty
Preceded by –	Regent of Boston College Law School; 1926–1939	Succeeded by –
Preceded by –	Regent of Georgetown Law School; 1929–1939	Succeeded by –
