= Alphonsus J. Donlon =

American Jesuit priest

The Reverend Alphonsus J. Donlon SJ
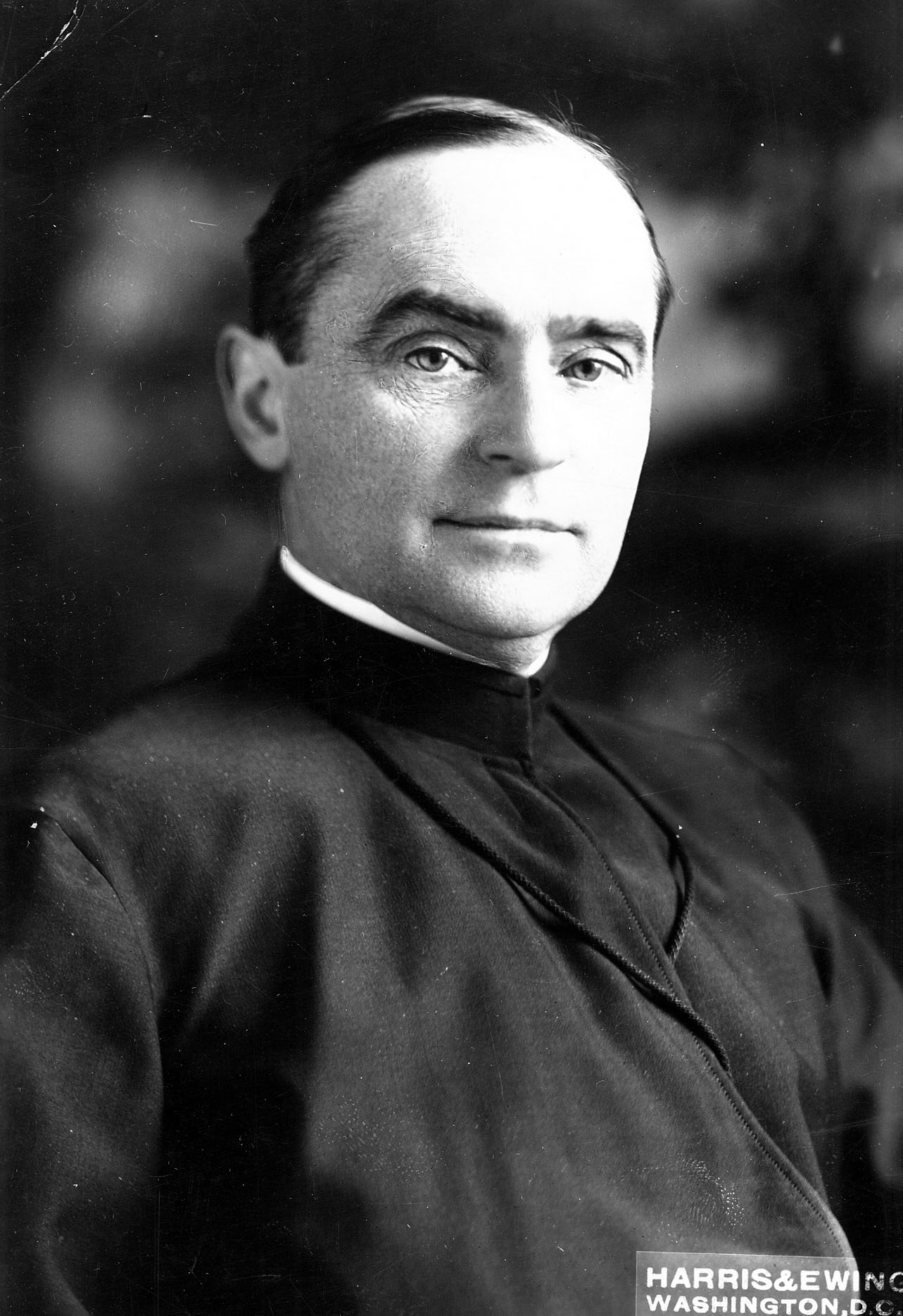
- Alphonsus J. Donlon in 1912

36th President of Georgetown University
- In office 1912–1918
- Preceded by: Joseph J. Himmel
- Succeeded by: John B. Creeden

Personal details
- Born: October 30, 1867 Albany, New York, U.S.
- Died: September 3, 1923 (aged 55) Tarrytown, New York, U.S.
- Resting place: Fordham University Cemetery
- Education: Georgetown University (BA); Woodstock College

Orders
- Ordination: June 28, 1903 by James Gibbons

Alphonsus J. Donlon SJ (October 30, 1867 – September 3, 1923) was an American Catholic priest and Jesuit who spent his career in priestly ministry and academia, including as president of Georgetown University from 1912 to 1918. Born in Albany, New York, he garnered a reputation as a good student and an exceptional collegiate athlete. As a professor, he went on to lead Georgetown University's sports program, which enjoyed great success. As a result, he became known as the "father of Georgetown athletics."

Donlon served as a professor of various sciences at Georgetown University and at Woodstock College, and as president of the former, he oversaw the removal of Georgetown Preparatory School from the university to a separate campus, and proposed the creation of the School of Foreign Service. For a significant portion of his career, he also served as a chaplain to Georgetown Visitation Monastery. In his later years, he engaged in pastoral work at St. Francis Xavier Church in New York City and taught at Fordham University.

== Early life ==
Alphonsus Donlon was born on October 30, 1867, in Albany, New York, to father Patrick Donlon and mother Julia Howard Donlon, a native of Albany. His father emigrated to the United States from Ireland as a young boy with his mother and sister, while Alphonsus' mother was a native of Albany, who died when he was eighteen months old. For this reason, Julia's mother and her sister largely raised Alphonsus and his six siblings.

=== Education ===
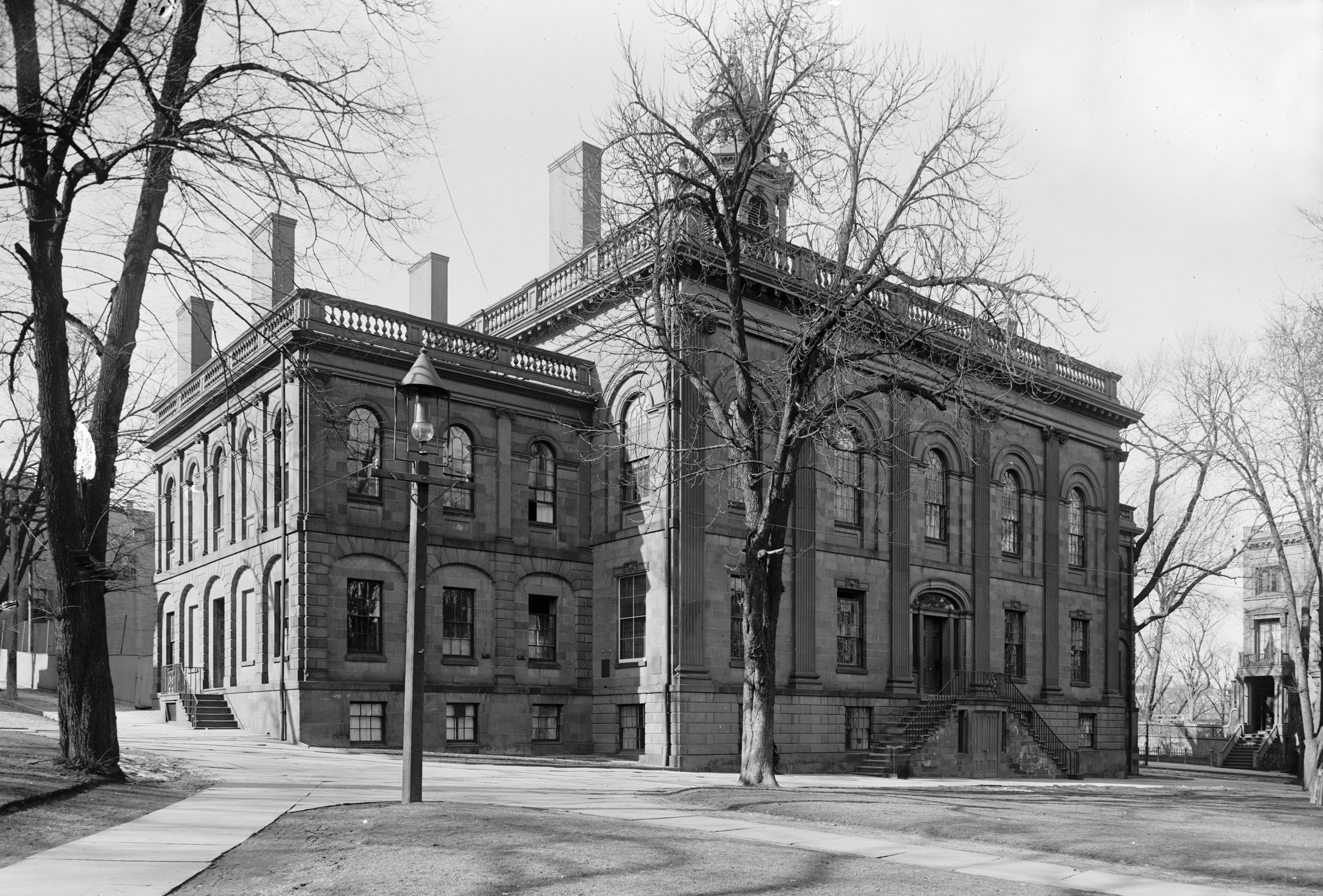
Schoolhouse of The Albany Academy in Donlon's era

He first attended the parochial school at St. Mary's Church, which was conducted out of the chapel of the Sisters of Charity. After receiving his First Communion, he enrolled at The Albany Academy, where he remained until the age of fifteen. In 1883, he continued his education at Georgetown Preparatory School, and then at Georgetown College the following year. At college, he excelled in such sports as baseball, football, tennis, and track. During his freshman year, he made the first-string baseball team as a shortstop, and remained in this position for the duration of his time at Georgetown. Academically, he was likewise accomplished, receiving the Goff Philosophical Medal and the Medal for Mechanics. Here, he was known among his friends by the nickname Al. Donlon received his bachelor's degree in 1888 and subsequently enrolled at the Massachusetts Institute of Technology (MIT), where he studied electrical engineering. After his first year at MIT, he studied for the summer in Europe. Upon his return in 1889, he decided to withdraw in order to pursue the priesthood.

== Formation and teaching ==
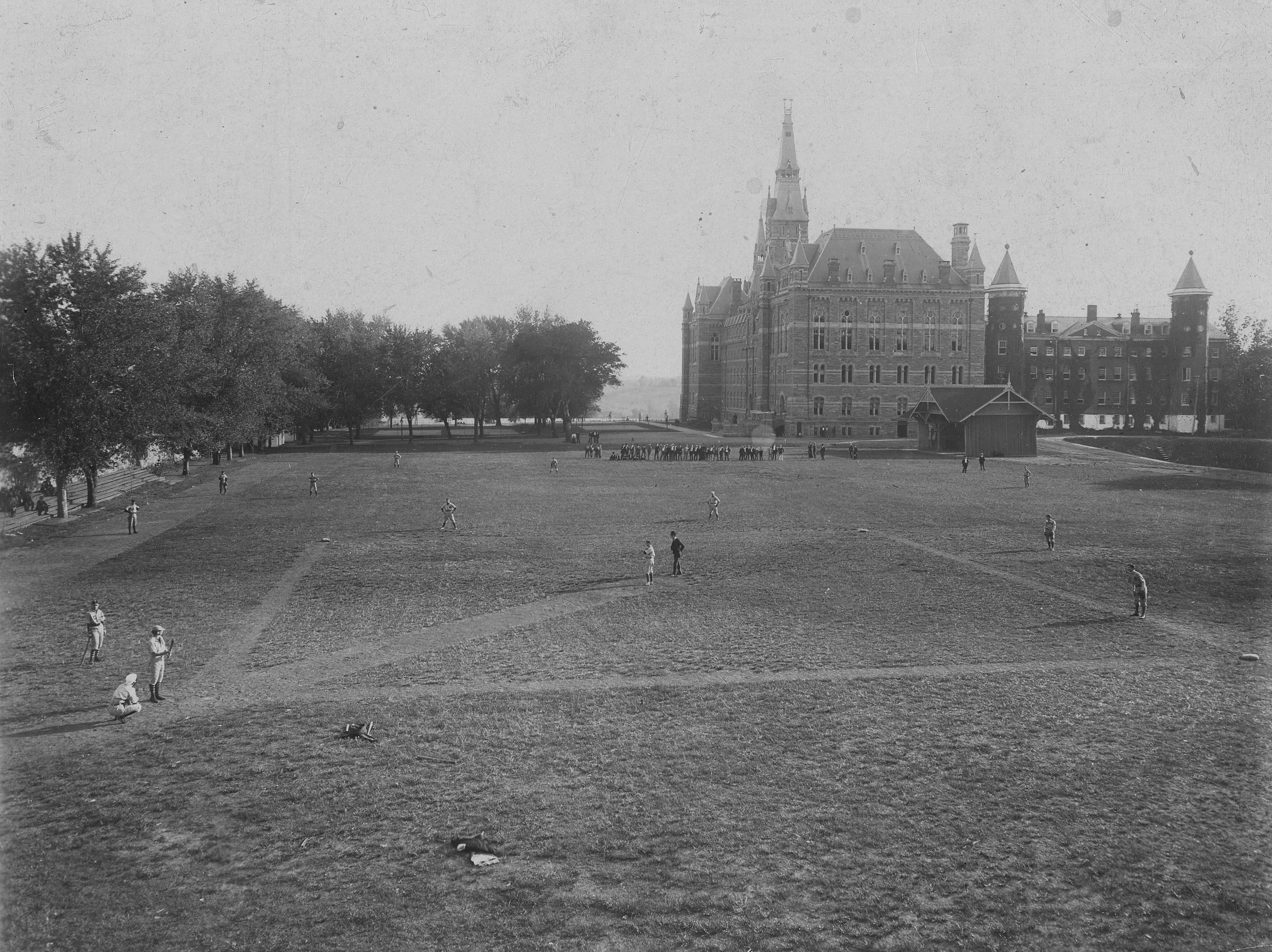
Georgetown baseball field in 1900

Donlon entered the Jesuit order on October 11, 1889. He proceeded to Frederick, Maryland, where he completed his novitiate in 1891. That year, he began his two years of study of the classics in Frederick, and followed it with three years philosophy and science, which he completed in 1895. Following his studies, he returned to Georgetown College in 1895, where he assumed a teaching position in physics, mechanics, geology, and astronomy. It was during this time as a teacher that he gained the informal title of "father of Georgetown athletics." As the faculty director of athletics, he coached all of Georgetown's teams, which went on to be highly successful.

Donlon remained at Georgetown until 1900, when he left for Woodstock College in Maryland to study theology. On June 28, 1903, he was ordained a priest by Cardinal James Gibbons at Woodstock College, and he completed his theological studies in 1904. From there, he went to Poughkeepsie, New York, to fulfill his tertianship under Fr. Pardow, which lasted until 1905. Donlon then returned again to Georgetown, where he resumed his teaching. In 1906, he left again for Woodstock, where he taught physics until 1911. On February 2, 1907, he attained the status of gradus and professed his solemn vows in the Society of Jesus.

== Georgetown University ==
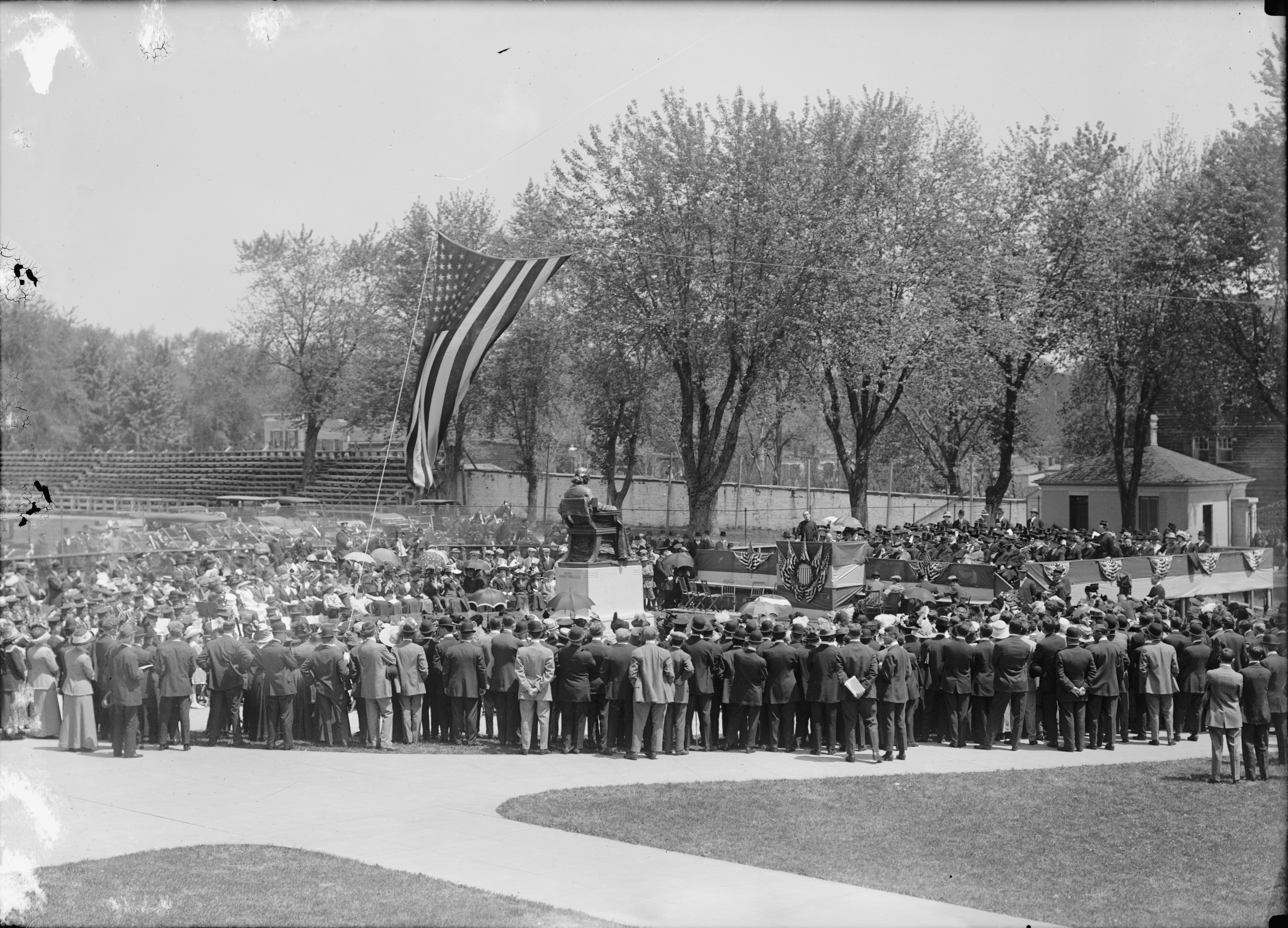
Unveiling of Bishop John Carroll statue in 1912

On October 10, 1911, Donlon was appointed the socius, or principal advisor, to the provincial superior of the Maryland Province of the Jesuits. After remaining in this position for more than a year, he was appointed the president of Georgetown University on January 23, 1912, succeeding Joseph J. Himmel. His style of leadership was one of ample delegation of responsibilities to subordinates and considerable deference to their judgment, some attributing it to his natural passivity and lack of any particular aptitude for the presidency.

Among his accomplishments as president was establishing a strong alumni association across the country. He also oversaw the unveiling of the statue of Bishop John Carroll in 1912. Another of Donlon's marks on Georgetown was his proposal to start a "school of Political and Social Science," which would include a "school of diplomacy" and would be connected with Georgetown Law School. He presented his proposal to the Jesuit consultors on March 31, 1913, who approved; he subsequently submitted his proposal to the Jesuit curia in Rome, but no action was taken. Though this proposal did not materialize until after his presidency, his proposition ultimately led to the creation of the School of Foreign Service. Donlon remained as president of Georgetown until May 1, 1918, when he requested the provincial superior to relieve him of the office by a Jesuit with greater vitality. He was succeeded by John B. Creeden.

=== Georgetown Preparatory School ===
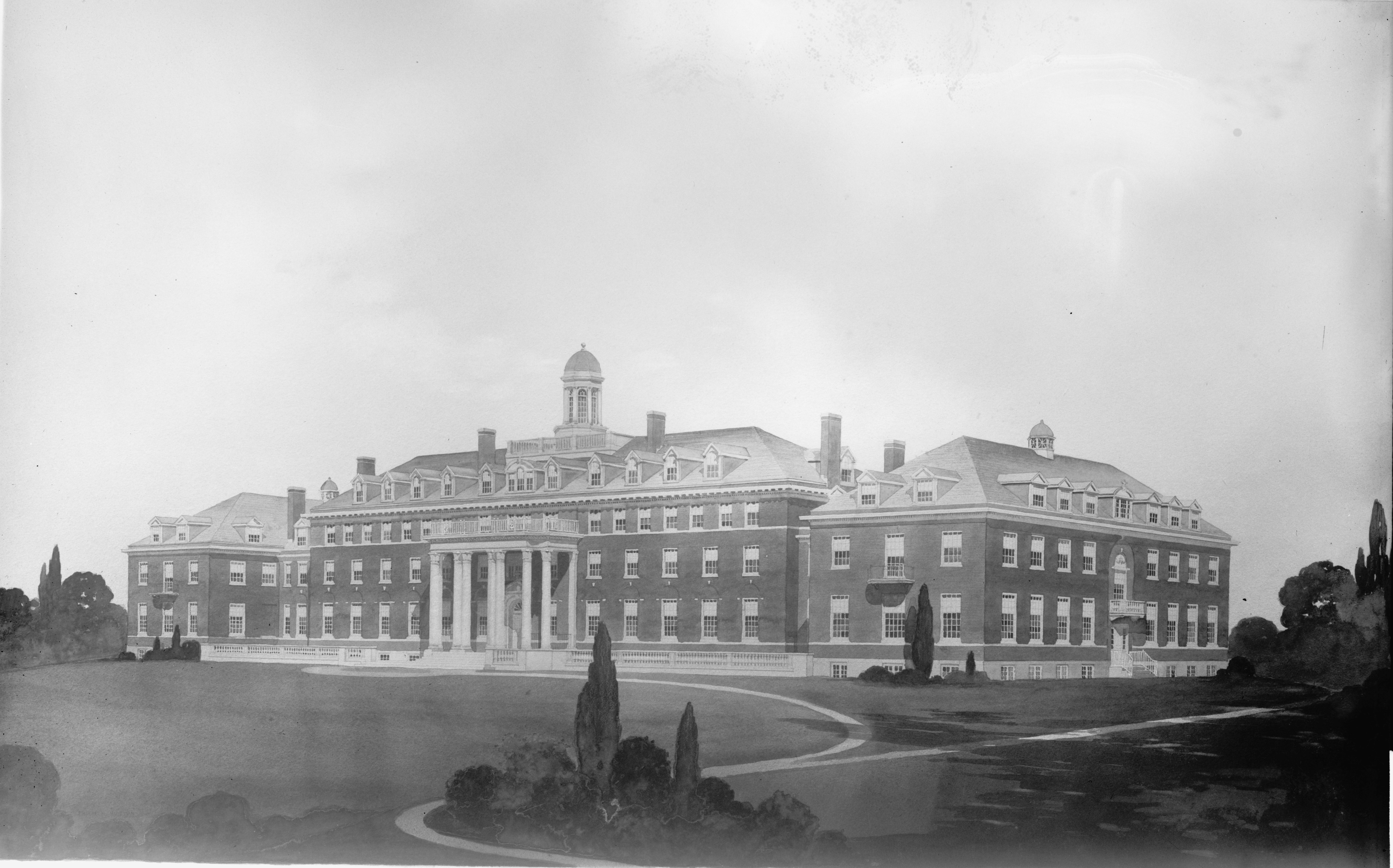
Donlon attended groundbreaking on the new building in 1916

Seeing a need to separate the preparatory division from the division of higher education at Georgetown, Donlon also was responsible for the relocation of Georgetown Preparatory School to its campus in North Bethesda, Maryland. He led fundraising to permit the purchase of land in the Maryland countryside on which to build the school, and traveled the area to locate such a suitable property. Having secured the permission of the Jesuit provincial, the President and Directors of Georgetown College purchased 92 acres (37 hectares). Construction of a new building was largely enabled by a donation by Class of 1869 alumnus Henry Walters. Though originally contributing $80,000, Walters increased his anonymous donation to $130,000 when Donlon expressed his worry over the increasing cost of the project. On October 25, 1916, ground was broken on the new, Georgian Revival building, with Donlon in attendance and the Apostolic Delegate to the United States, Archbishop Giovanni Bonzano, ceremonially turning the first soil. Due to the outbreak of World War I, the building was not completed until 1919.

== Chaplain to Georgetown Visitation Monastery ==
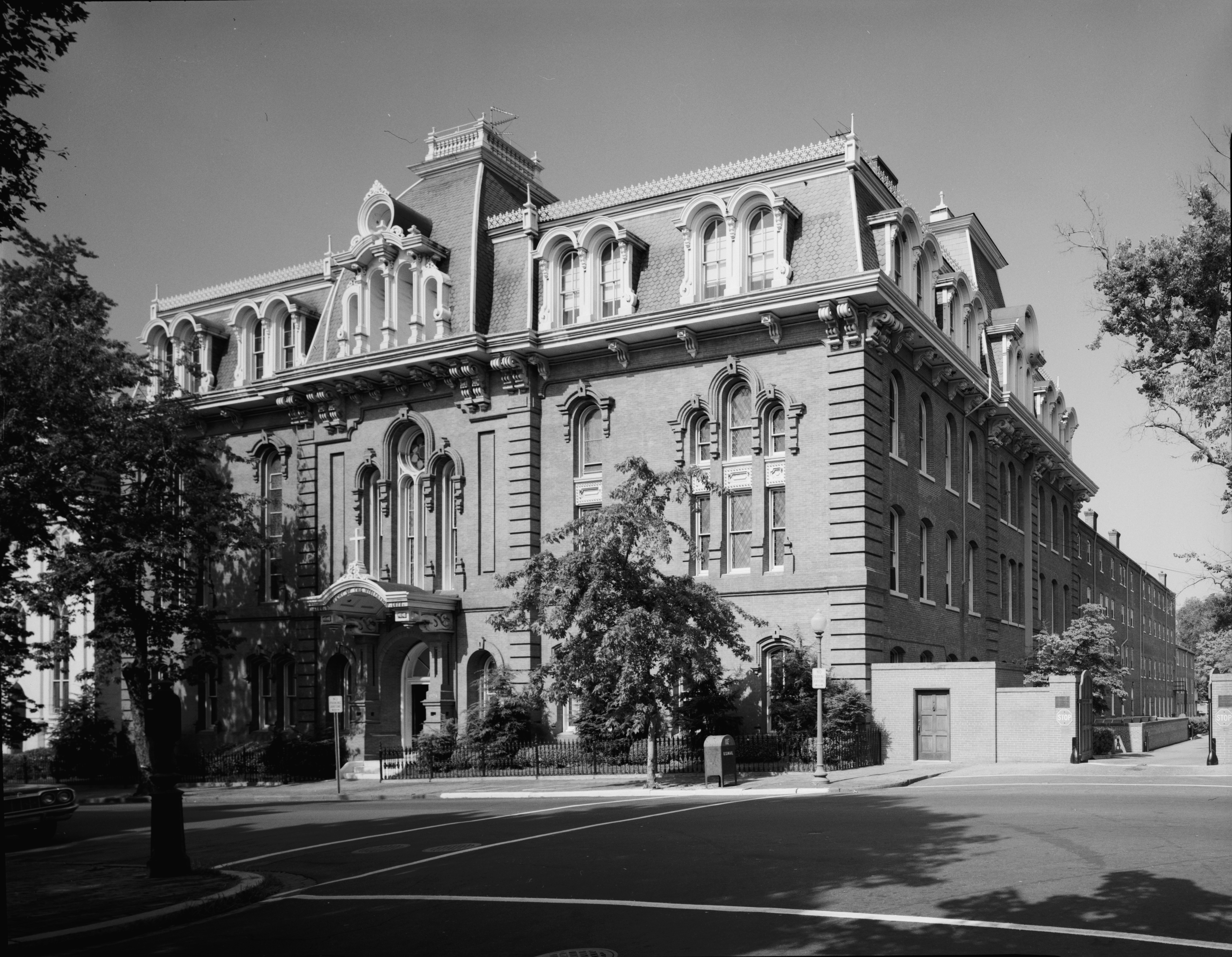
Georgetown Visitation Monastery to which Donlon was chaplain

In 1905, Donlon was appointed chaplain to the nuns at the nearby Georgetown Visitation Monastery, and held this position until his death. During his subsequent presidency of Georgetown, he ensured that the sisters of Georgetown Visitation Monastery receive degrees from Georgetown by opening a summer school for the sisters, staffed by some of the best teachers in the Maryland Province, which covered a broad range of subjects. Donlon regularly attended the sisters' debates, musical performances, and dramatical performances, officiated at their celebrations, and led their students on retreats.

When he was transferred to do pastoral work in New York, Donlon continued to work with the monastery. He would send promising students to the monastery, and led the community in a retreat in 1922, which was said to have impressed many of the sisters.

== New York ==
Immediately following his presidency of Georgetown, Donlon was slated to go to Boston as pastor of St. Mary's Church. He is also recorded as teaching at Brooklyn College from 1918 to 1919. He then served as a minister at St. Francis Xavier Church in Manhattan from 1919 to 1920, where he was made the prefect of the church. He also served as the secretary of Xavier High School in 1920. He then transitioned to pastoral work at the same church, which he did until 1923.

In July 1923, Donlon was appointed a professor of philosophy at Fordham University.

=== Death ===
Donlon was conducting a retreat at Manhattanville College in Purchase, New York, on August 31, 1923, when he suddenly suffered a heart attack at 11 a.m. while leaving the chapel. After consultation with a doctor, it was intended that he be brought to St. Vincent's Hospital in New York City. However, at 11 p.m. on September 3, 1923, he died in the infirmary at Manhattanville. He was then buried in the Fordham University Cemetery.

Academic offices
Preceded by Joseph J. Himmel	36th President of Georgetown University; 1912–1918	Succeeded by John B. Creeden
