= Charles W. Lyons =

American Jesuit priest and academic administrator

The Reverend Charles W. Lyons SJ
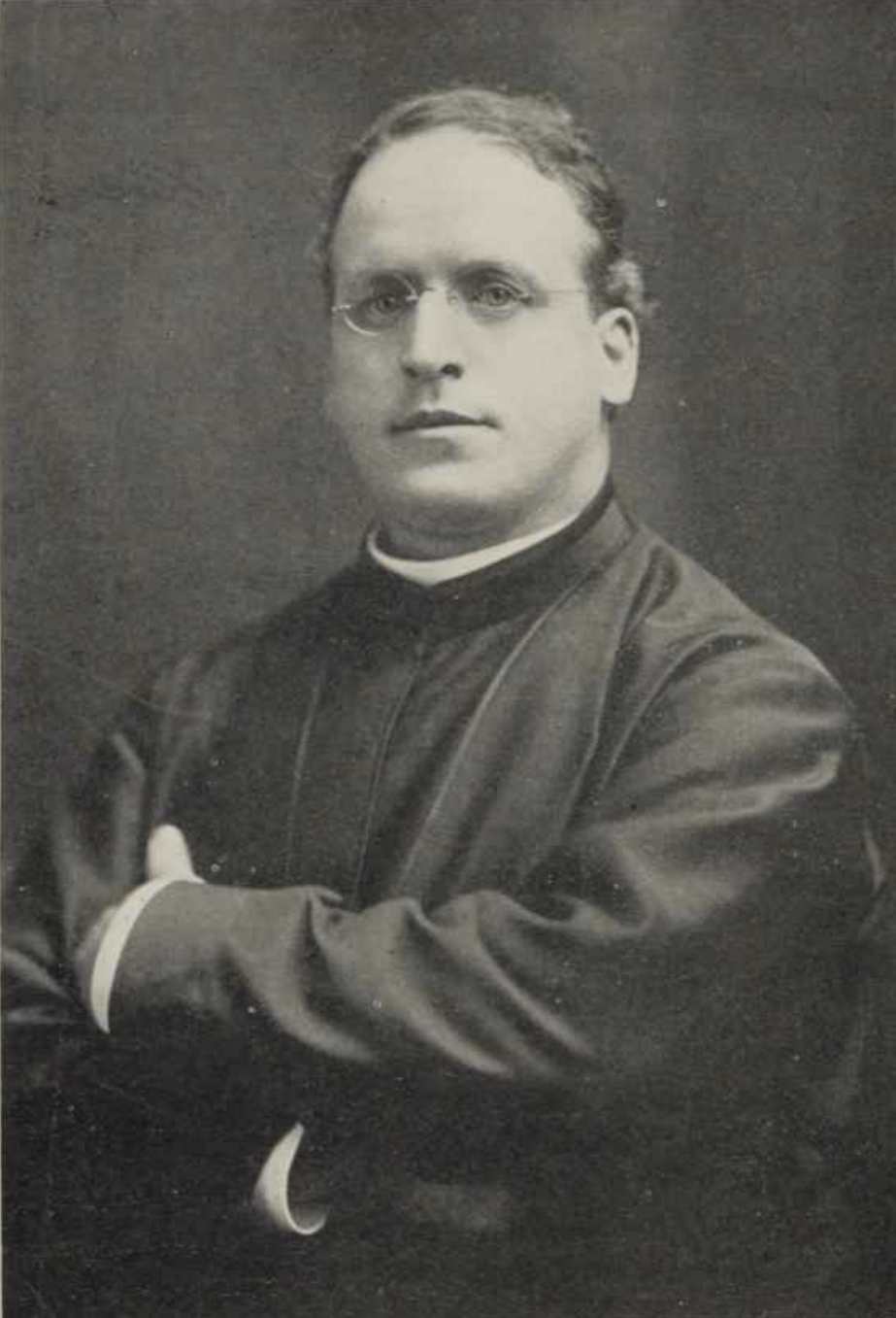
- Charles W. Lyons in 1914

38th President of Georgetown University
- In office 1924–1928
- Preceded by: John B. Creeden
- Succeeded by: W. Coleman Nevils

14th President of Boston College
- In office 1914–1919
- Preceded by: Thomas I. Gasson
- Succeeded by: William J. Devlin

11th President of Saint Joseph's College
- In office 1909–1914
- Preceded by: Cornelius Gillespie
- Succeeded by: J. Charles Davey

Personal details
- Born: January 31, 1868 Boston, Massachusetts, U.S.
- Died: January 31, 1939 (aged 71) Boston, Massachusetts
- Resting place: College of the Holy Cross Cemetery
- Education: Woodstock College

Orders
- Ordination: 1904

Charles William Lyons SJ (January 31, 1868 – January 31, 1939) was an American Catholic priest who became the only Jesuit and likely the only educator in the United States to have served as the president of four colleges. Born in Boston, Massachusetts, he attended the local public schools before entering the wool industry. He abandoned his career in industry to enter the Society of Jesus. While a novice in Maryland, he suffered a nervous breakdown and was sent to Georgetown University as prefect. He then resumed his studies at Woodstock College, teaching intermittently at Gonzaga College in Washington, D.C. and Loyola College in Baltimore. After his ordination, he became a professor at St. Francis Xavier College in New York City and at Boston College.

In 1908, Lyons became the rector of Gonzaga College, where he remained for a year before being appointed the president of Saint Joseph's College in Philadelphia. While there, he had constructed a new building for the faculty, and his tenure came to an end when he became the president of Boston College in 1914. He continued the major construction plan of his predecessor, overseeing the completion of St. Mary's Hall and Alumni Field. He also dealt with the severe downturn in enrollment due to World War I. His term came to an end in 1919, and for the next several years, he taught at Boston College, was a priest at the Church of St. Ignatius Loyola in New York, oversaw the construction of Weston College, and led retreats around the country.

He was finally appointed president of Georgetown University in 1923. While he managed construction of the New North building, he was regarded as a poor leader, and his term ended in 1928. Lyons spent his final years as a missionary, and was awarded the Order of the Star of Romania.

== Early life and education ==
Charles William Lyons was born on January 31, 1868, in Boston, Massachusetts. He was one of seven children, and his brother George also became a priest. As a young boy, he moved to South Boston and became a parishioner of the Church of Saints Peter and Paul. He attended the Boston public schools, including Bigelow Grammar School, and The English High School. Upon graduating from high school, he went to work in the wool industry, where he advanced quickly. During this time, he studied Latin on his own, and joined the Young Men's Catholic Association, which was founded by the Church of the Immaculate Conception in the South End of Boston. He eventually became a member of the association's board of directors.

=== Jesuit formation ===
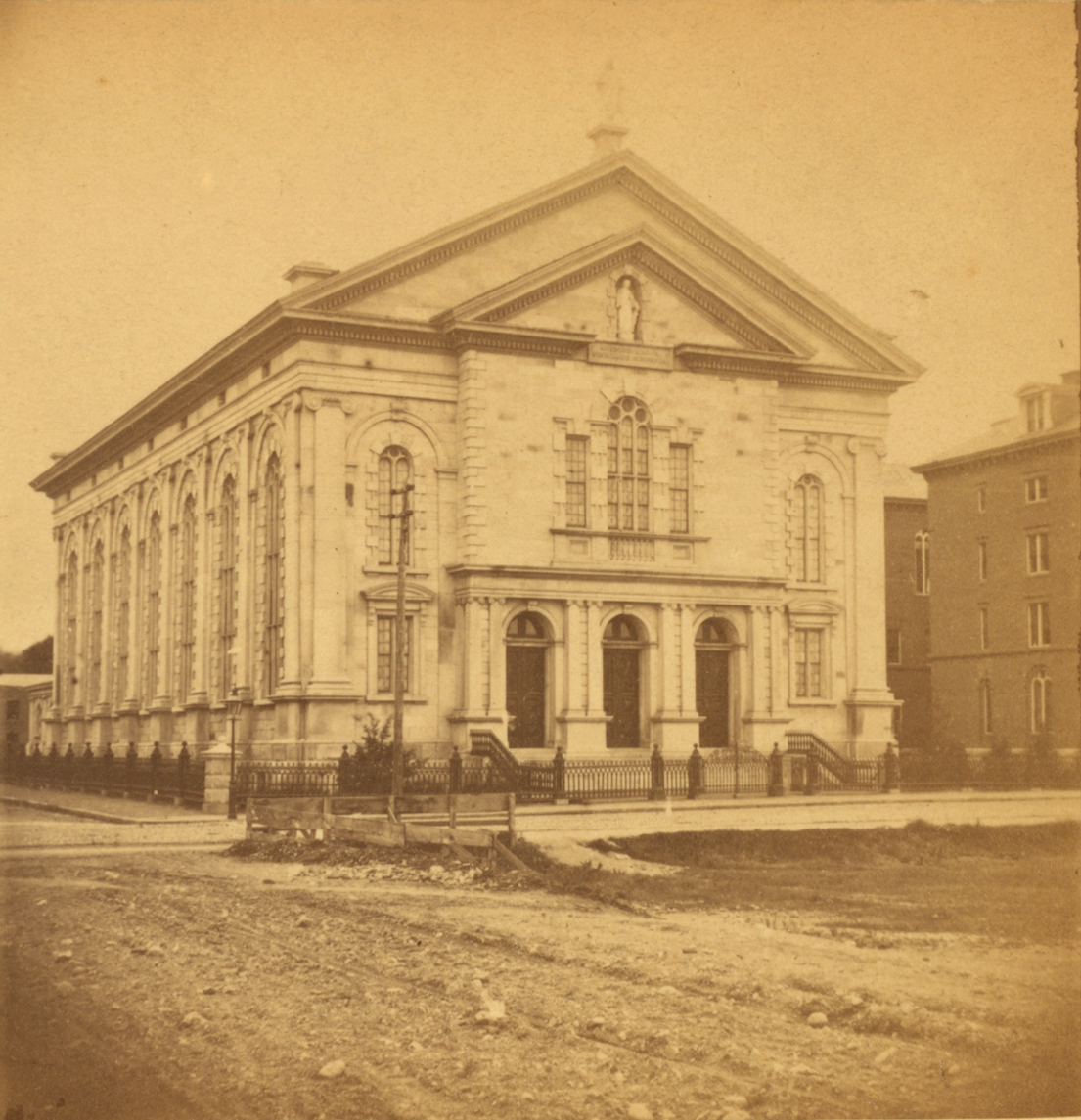
Immaculate Conception Church in the South End of Boston

Following his exposure to the Jesuits at Immaculate Conception Church, Lyons joined the Society of Jesus, and his application was accepted by the provincial superior, Thomas J. Campbell. He proceeded to the Jesuit novitiate in Frederick, Maryland, on August 14, 1890. He found his formation at Frederick difficult, and suffered a nervous breakdown during his juniorate, which affected his eyesight. As a result, he was sent to Georgetown University, where he was appointed prefect of the young students, who were fond of him. He remained in this position for one year, before resuming his studies in Frederick. Lyons completed his juniorate in 1895 and commenced his study of philosophy at Woodstock College. There, he gained a reputation as being a good tenor singer, and he assisted with the annual plays. During this time, he was also a catechist at St. Alphonsus Church in Woodstock, Maryland.

Following his philosophical studies, Lyons was sent to Gonzaga College in Washington, D.C., where he taught chemistry to the high school students. He was then sent to Loyola College in Baltimore, Maryland in 1901 to teach grammar and mathematics. The following year, Lyons returned to Woodstock for his theological studies. At Woodstock, he was ordained a priest in 1904. In 1906, he returned to Georgetown as the prefect of discipline. Lyons then spent his tertianship year at St. Andrew-on-Hudson in Hyde Park, New York.

Following his tertianship, Lyons was appointed a professor of philosophy and political economy at St. Francis Xavier College in New York City. He then transferred to Boston College as a professor of psychology.

== Gonzaga College ==
Lyons was at Boston College for only a short while, before being appointed the rector of Gonzaga College. He assumed the position on December 27, 1908, succeeding Joseph J. Himmel. Shortly after he took office, an earthquake struck Messina, Italy, and the school offered a solemn high requiem mass for the victims, which was celebrated by Bishop Diomede Falconio and sung by Bonaventura Cerretti. In attendance were Bishop Denis J. O'Connell, Attorney General Charles Joseph Bonaparte, the Italian ambassador to the United States, Joseph Himmel, and priests from the Dominican, Franciscan, and Paulist orders. A banquet was held to honor the new president on February 10, which was attended by Congressman William Bourke Cockran. Lyons' term came to an end on July 8, 1909, when he was succeeded by Eugene DeL. McDonnell.

== Saint Joseph's College ==
Following his tenure at Gonzaga College, Lyons was appointed the rector and president of Saint Joseph's College in Philadelphia in July 1909, where he succeeded Cornelius Gillespie. Upon his assumption of the presidency, he simultaneously became pastor of the Church of the Gesú. He maintained good relations with the two successive Archbishops of Philadelphia, Patrick John Ryan and Edmond Francis Prendergast throughout his term, and the Church of the Gesú prospered during this time.

Lyons oversaw the construction of a new building for the college faculty on 18th and Thompson Streets. Its ground was broken in the fall of 1910, and the building was complete by September 1911. Lyons' presidency ended in 1914, when he was succeeded by J. Charles Davey.

== Boston College ==
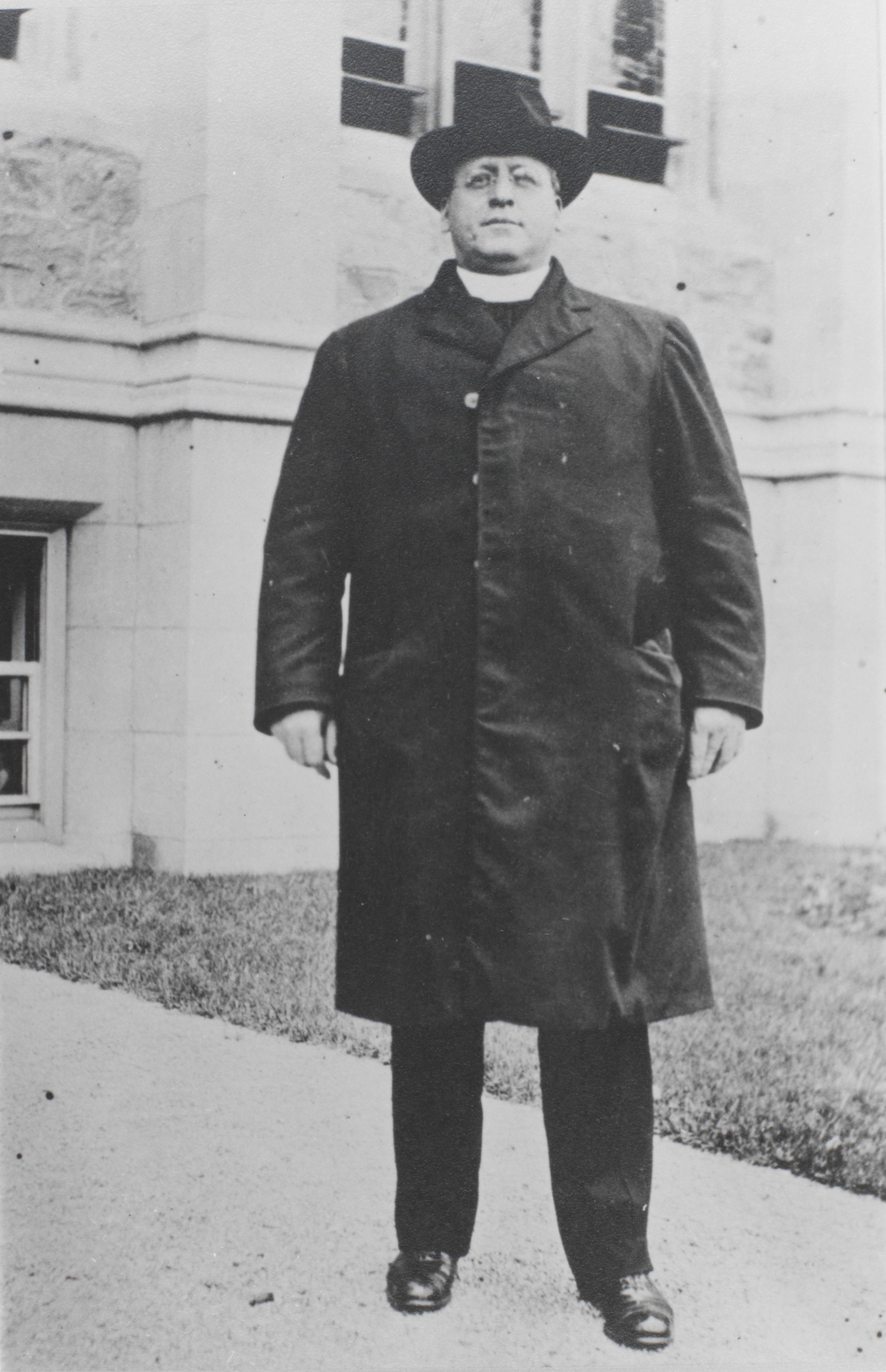
Lyons at Boston College in 1916

On January 11, 1914, Lyons became the rector and president of Boston College. At the same time, he served as the pastor of the Church of the Immaculate Conception. His selection was praised by many due to his experience in managing building projects. He continued the work of his predecessor, Thomas I. Gasson, to expand the college's campus. With construction already underway, he had architects modify the plan for St. Mary's Hall to add a fourth floor, as well as expand the size of the chapel to accommodate 250 people. St. Mary's Hall was completed on January 4, 1917. A permanent athletic field was built during his term, and Lyons christened the new Alumni Field on October 30, 1915.

With respect to the curriculum, Lyons terminated the granting of graduate degrees to students in the newly established adult night education department in 1914, upon the request of the faculty, who argued that the program would strain the faculty and facilities. The Philomatheia Club was also established, which was a group of Catholic women from Boston who would support the college. Boston College High School was physically separated from the rest of the college for the first time in 1917, but Lyons continued as rector of both. He also began discussions to create the School of Education, which were not realized until 1919. In 1918, he was made a member of the Massachusetts Board of Education.

His presidency was largely influenced by World War I. Lyons believed that it was his duty to support President Woodrow Wilson during time of war, and he was appointed to the Military Commission of Massachusetts during 1915 and 1916. Enrollment at the school dropped by 81% and 15 students and alumni of the school were killed in the war. Boston College hosted a unit of the Student Army Training Corps. Following the end of the war, a Reserve Officers' Training Corps unit was established. Lyons' term as president ended on July 20, 1919, and he was succeeded by William J. Devlin.

=== Pastoral work in New York ===
Upon the end of his presidency in 1919, Lyons was transferred to the Church of St. Ignatius Loyola in New York City, where he did pastoral work, including leading retreats for the priests in Boston, Providence, Portland, New York, Saint Paul, and Chicago. He was also especially active in hearing confessions. After three years, Lyons returned to Boston College as a professor of metaphysics, and as the head of the department of philosophy. He also gave lectures on philosophy to various groups in Boston. He was also tasked with overseeing the construction of the Weston College.

== Georgetown University ==
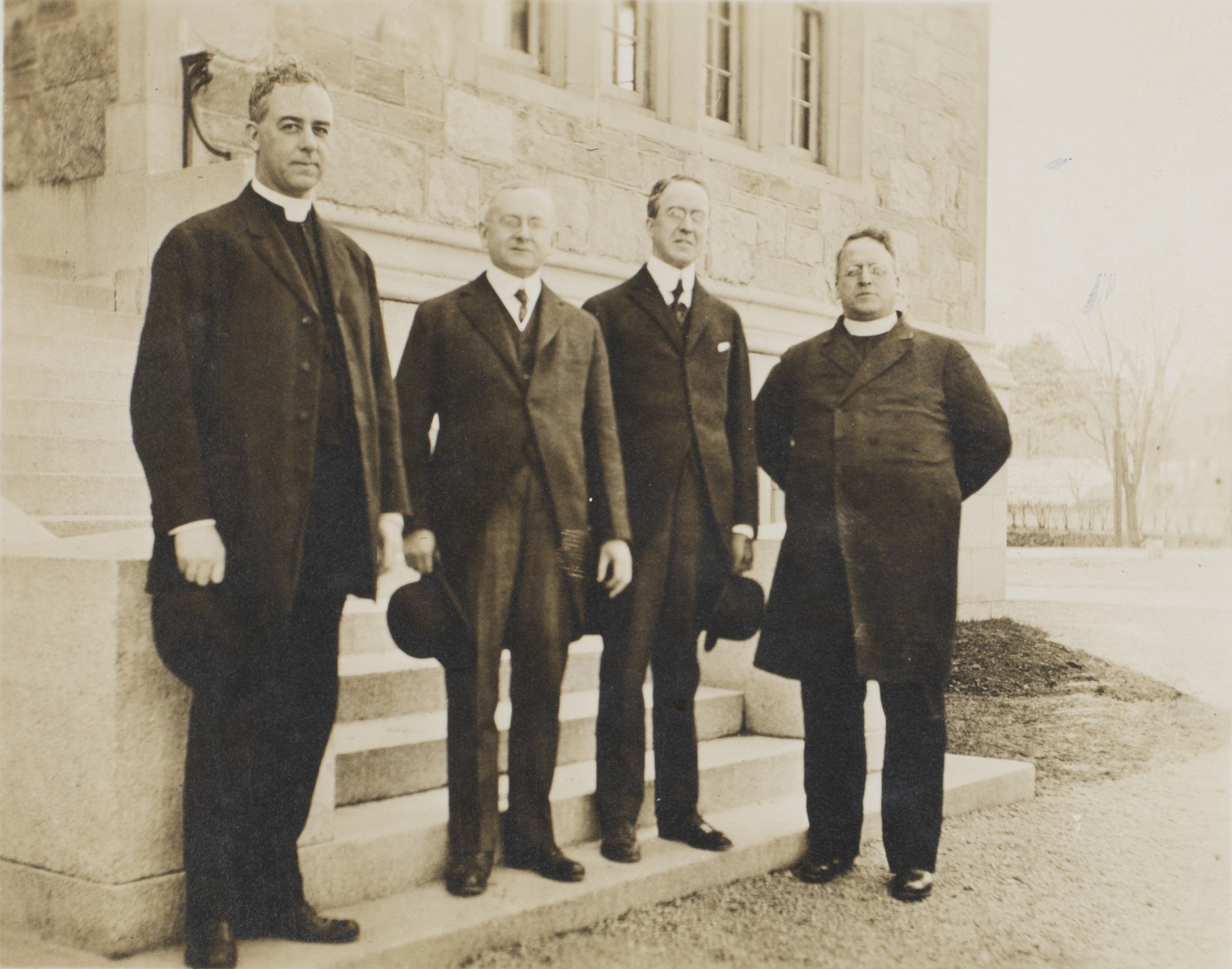
Lyons (right) and his brother, Frederick, (second from right) in 1916

Lyons was appointed the president of Georgetown University in October 1924, succeeding John B. Creeden. Upon his appointment, he became the only Jesuit and likely the only educator in the United States to have been president of four different colleges. Lyons showed little interest in leading Georgetown, and his presidency was considered unsuccessful. The fundraising campaign begun by Creeden floundered during his presidency and ended far short of its goal. He was frequently away from the university, as he preferred to preach and lead retreats. Seeing insufficient dormitory space as the most pressing need on campus, he oversaw the construction of the New North building in 1925, which was completed in June 1926 in the Colonial Revival style. The interior of Old North was then gutted and redesigned to house classrooms and student services. New North doubled the amount of housing on campus. He also oversaw construction of a new wing of the Georgetown University Hospital.

Lyons modernized the curriculum, introducing an alternate course of study to the classical one, and allowing majors for upperclassmen. This coincided with a significant increase in the number of students, and Lyons responded by enlarging the faculty. By 1927, there were more lay faculty than Jesuits. As a result, the tuition increased substantially to pay for the salaries of the lay professors. Lyons was invited by Calvin Coolidge to his 1925 presidential inauguration, and sat among the cabinet. President Coolidge also appointed him to a federal commission that would plan the 150th anniversary of the Battle of Bunker Hill. During this time, he was awarded the Order of the Star of Romania, with the rank of commander. Lyons' presidency came to an end in 1928, and he was succeeded by W. Coleman Nevils.

== Later years ==
Upon the end of his leadership of Georgetown, Lyons joined the Jesuit mission band in Boston, with which he traveled throughout New England, New York, and Maryland for eight years. His health began to deteriorate in 1936, so the Jesuit superiors stationed him at Weston College as the spiritual father of the theology students. He was transferred to the Church of the Immaculate Conception in Boston in July 1937. The following year, he suffered a major heart attack, from which doctors did not expect him to recover.

In 1938, having seemingly recovered, he went to Boston College High School, but proved unable to continue working. While residing there, he suffered another heart attack, and was sent to St. Margaret's Hospital in Dorchester, where he died on January 31, 1939. He was buried in the Jesuit cemetery at the College of the Holy Cross. Lyons Hall at Boston College, which opened 1951, was named in his honor.

Academic offices
Preceded by Joseph J. Himmel	21st Rector of Gonzaga College; 1908–1909	Succeeded by Eugene DeL. McDonnell
Preceded by Cornelius Gillespie	11th President of Saint Joseph's College; 1909–1914	Succeeded by J. Charles Davey
Preceded by Thomas I. Gasson	14th President of Boston College; 1914–1919	Succeeded by William J. Devlin
Preceded by John B. Creeden	38th President of Georgetown University; 1924–1928	Succeeded by W. Coleman Nevils
Catholic Church titles
Preceded by Cornelius Gillespie	Pastor of the Church of the Gesú; 1909–1914	Succeeded by J. Charles Davey
Preceded by Thomas I. Gasson	15th Pastor of the Church of the Immaculate Conception; 1914–1919	Succeeded by John J. Geoghan
