= Gasson Hall =

Main building of Boston College

Coordinates: 42.3356°N 71.1705°W

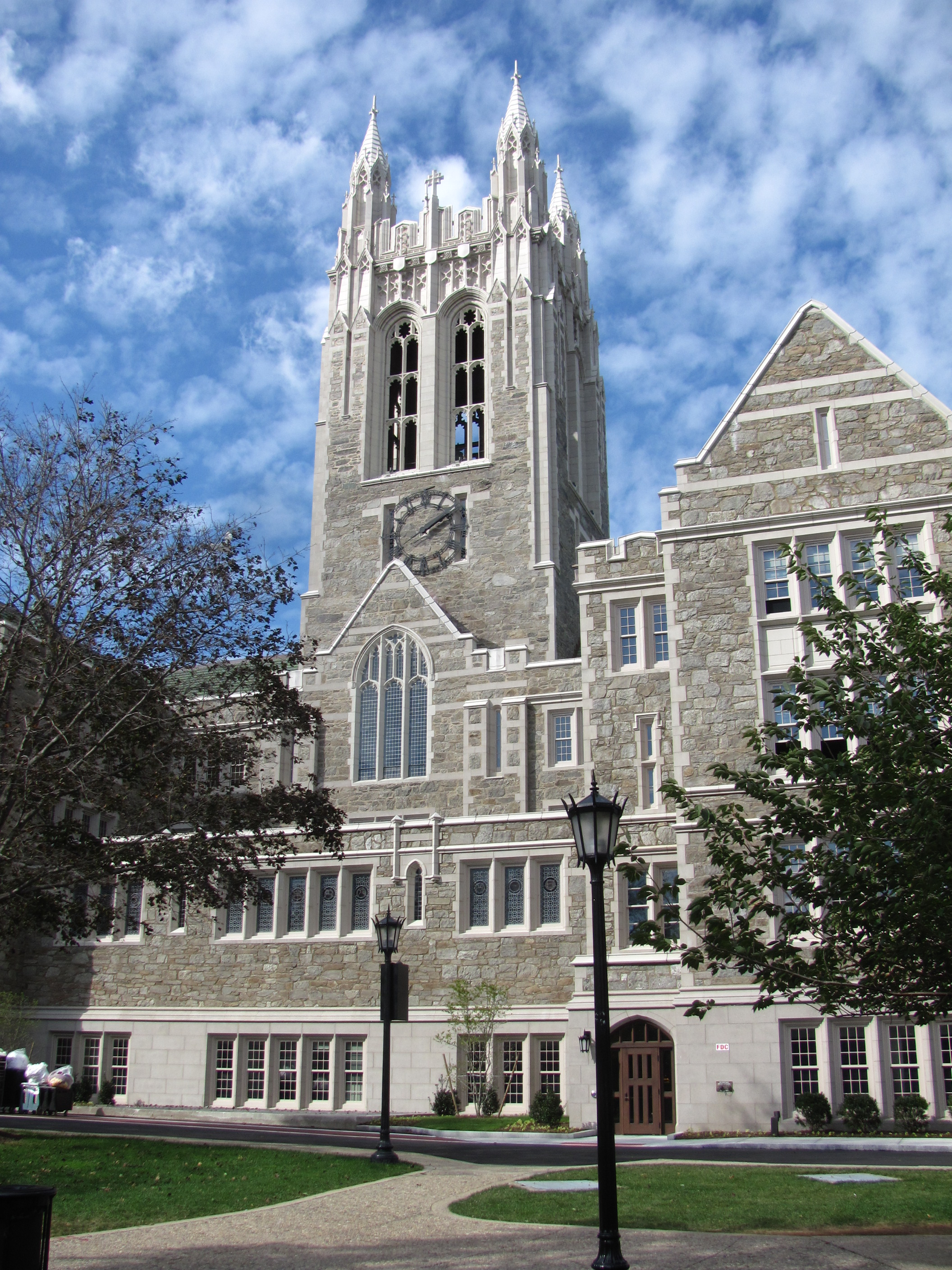
- Gasson Hall in 2011, post-restoration
- Interactive map of the Gasson Hall area
- Former names: Recitation Building Tower Building

General information
- Architectural style: Gothic Revival
- Location: Boston College Main Campus, Chestnut Hill, Newton MA
- Completed: 1913
- Owner: Boston College

Height
- Height: 200 Feet

Technical details
- Floor count: 4

Design and construction
- Architect: Charles Donagh Magannis

Gasson Hall is a building on the campus of Boston College in Chestnut Hill, Massachusetts. Designed by Charles Donagh Maginnis in 1908, the hall has influenced the development of Collegiate Gothic architecture in North America. Gasson Hall is named after the 13th president of Boston College, Thomas I. Gasson, S.J., considered BC's "second founder."

== History ==
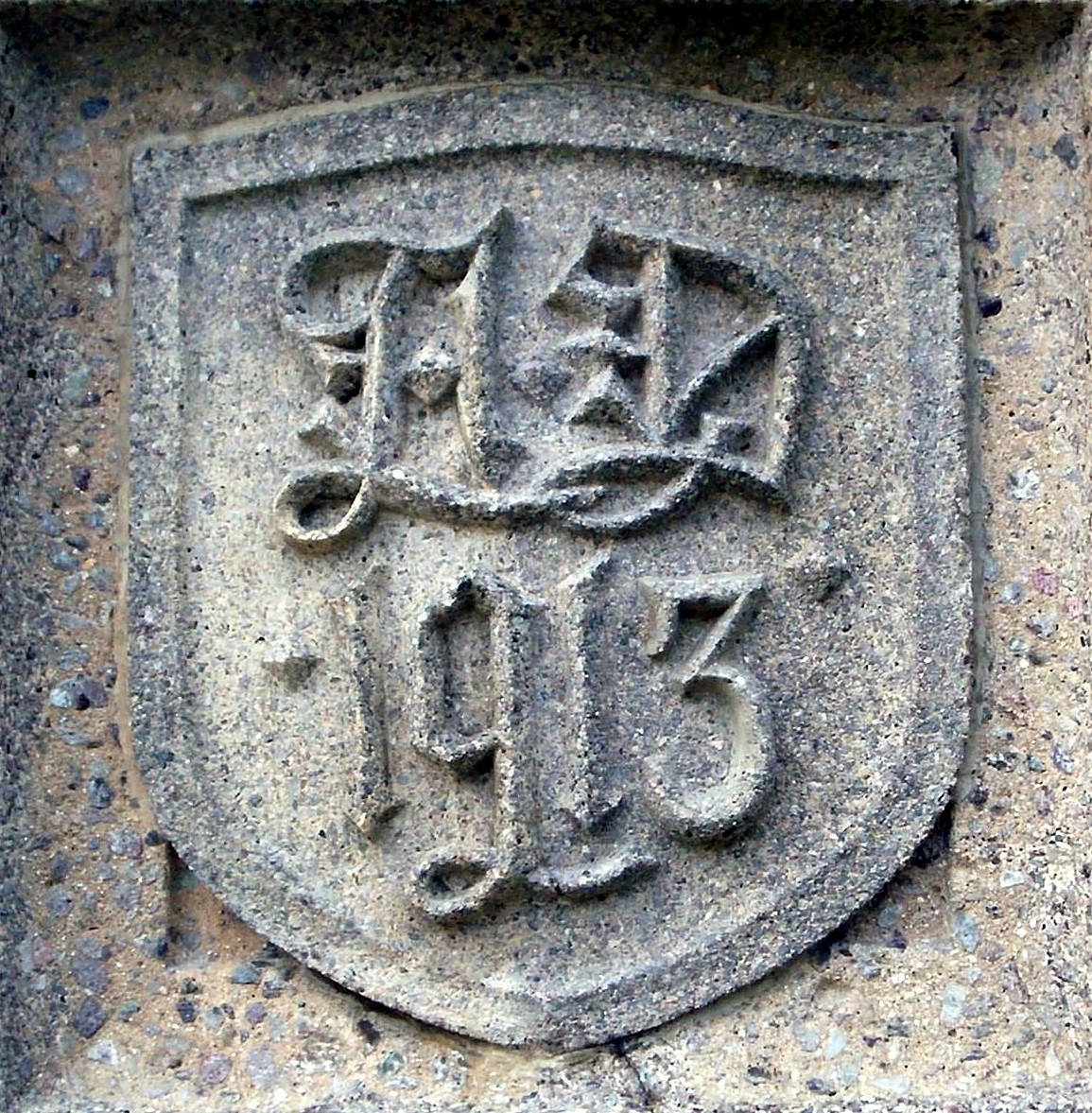
Gasson Hall Cornerstone

In 1907, newly installed Boston College President Thomas I. Gasson, S.J., determined that BC's cramped, urban campus in Boston's South End was inadequate and unsuited for significant expansion. Inspired by John Winthrop's early vision of Boston as a "city upon a hill," he re-imagined Boston College as a world-renowned university and a beacon of Jesuit education.

Less than a year after taking office, he purchased the Lawrence farm on Chestnut Hill, six miles west of the city. He organized an international competition for the design of the campus master plan and set about raising funds for the construction of the "new" university. Two years later, the competition winner was announced and construction began. From a field of entries by some of the most distinguished architects of the day, Charles Donagh Maginnis' proposal for an "Oxford in America" was selected.

== Architectural description ==
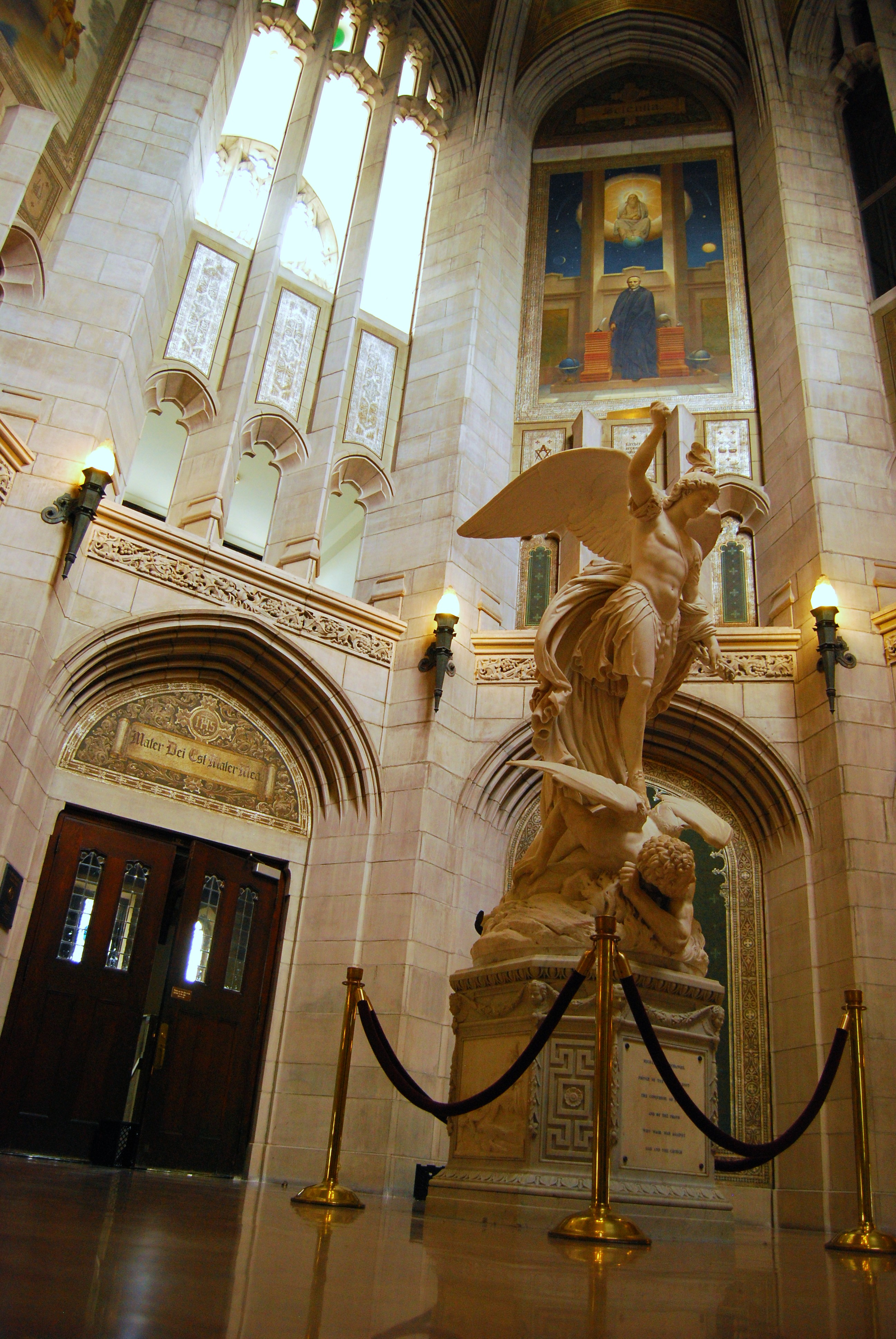
Gasson Hall interior rotunda

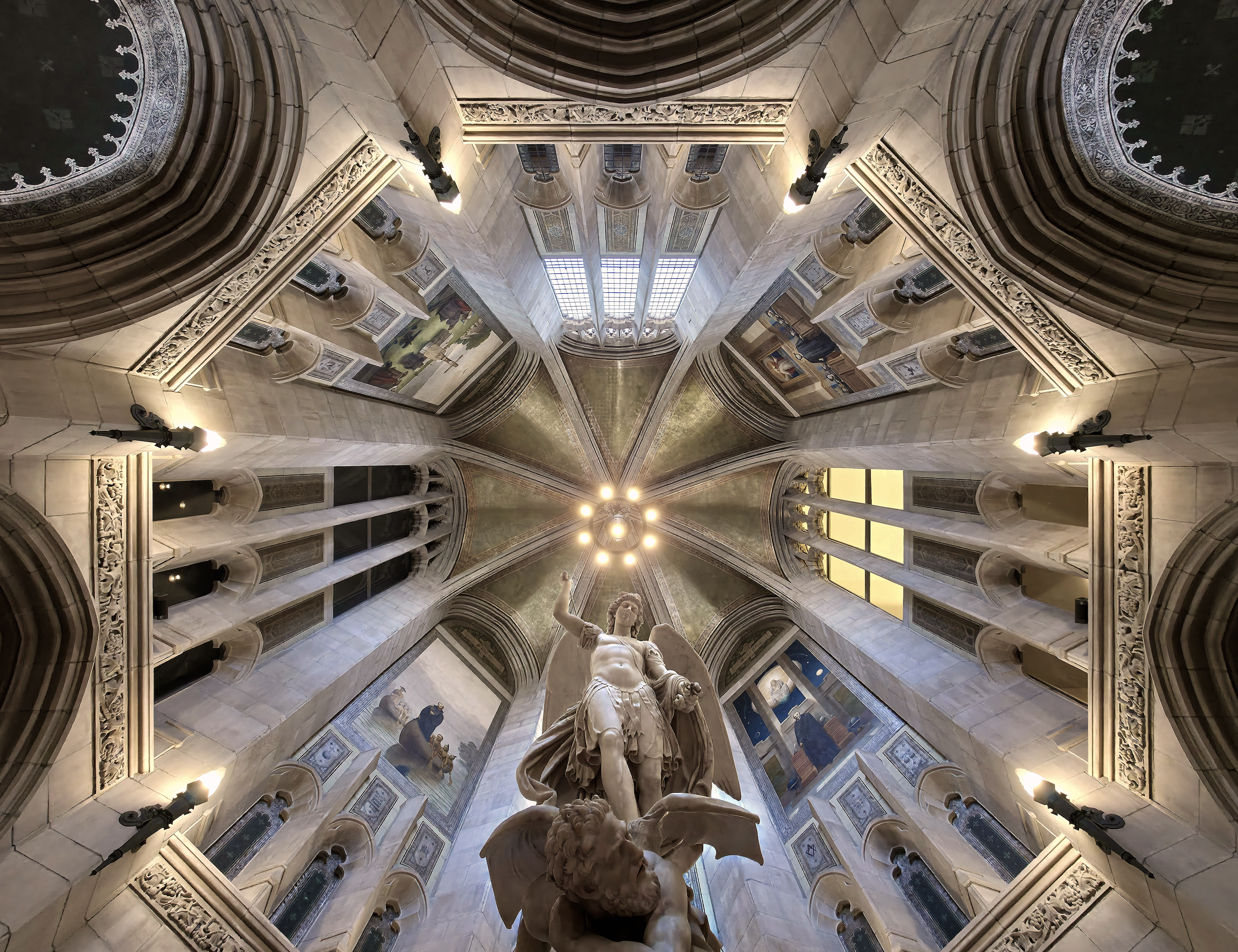
Rotunda

Gasson Hall is a seminal example of Collegiate Gothic architecture in North America. Publication of its design in 1909 received praise from influential American Gothicist Ralph Adams Cram.

Combining the Gothic style of his medieval precedent with the axes, balance and symmetry of the Beaux-Arts style, he proposed a vast complex of academic buildings set in a cruciform plan. The design suggested an enormous outdoor cathedral, with the long entry drive at the "nave," the main quadrangle at the "apse" and secondary quadrangles at the "transepts." At the "crossing", Maginnis placed the university's main building which he called Recitation Hall. Using stone quarried on the site, the building was constructed at the highest point on Chestnut Hill, commanding a view of the surrounding landscape and the city to the east. Dominated by a soaring 200-foot bell tower, Recitation Hall was known simply as the Tower Building when it finally opened in 1913.

Maginnis' design broke from the traditional Oxbridge models that had inspired it—and that had till then characterized Gothic architecture on American campuses. In its unprecedented scale, Gasson Tower was conceived not as the belfry of a singular building, but as the crowning campanile of Maginnis' new "city upon a hill".

== Rotunda decorations ==
At the center of the rotunda is a marble sculpture by Scipione Tadolini representing Saint Michael defeating Satan. It was commissioned by Gardner Brewer, a Boston merchant, in 1865. After Brewer's death, the sculpture was purchased by Boston art dealers Julius and Henry Koopman. An anonymous donor then purchased it for Boston College, and it was placed in Gasson Hall in 1913. The rotunda also features murals by Francis C. Schroen, an artist and Jesuit brother.

== The Church, the Educator of Mankind ==
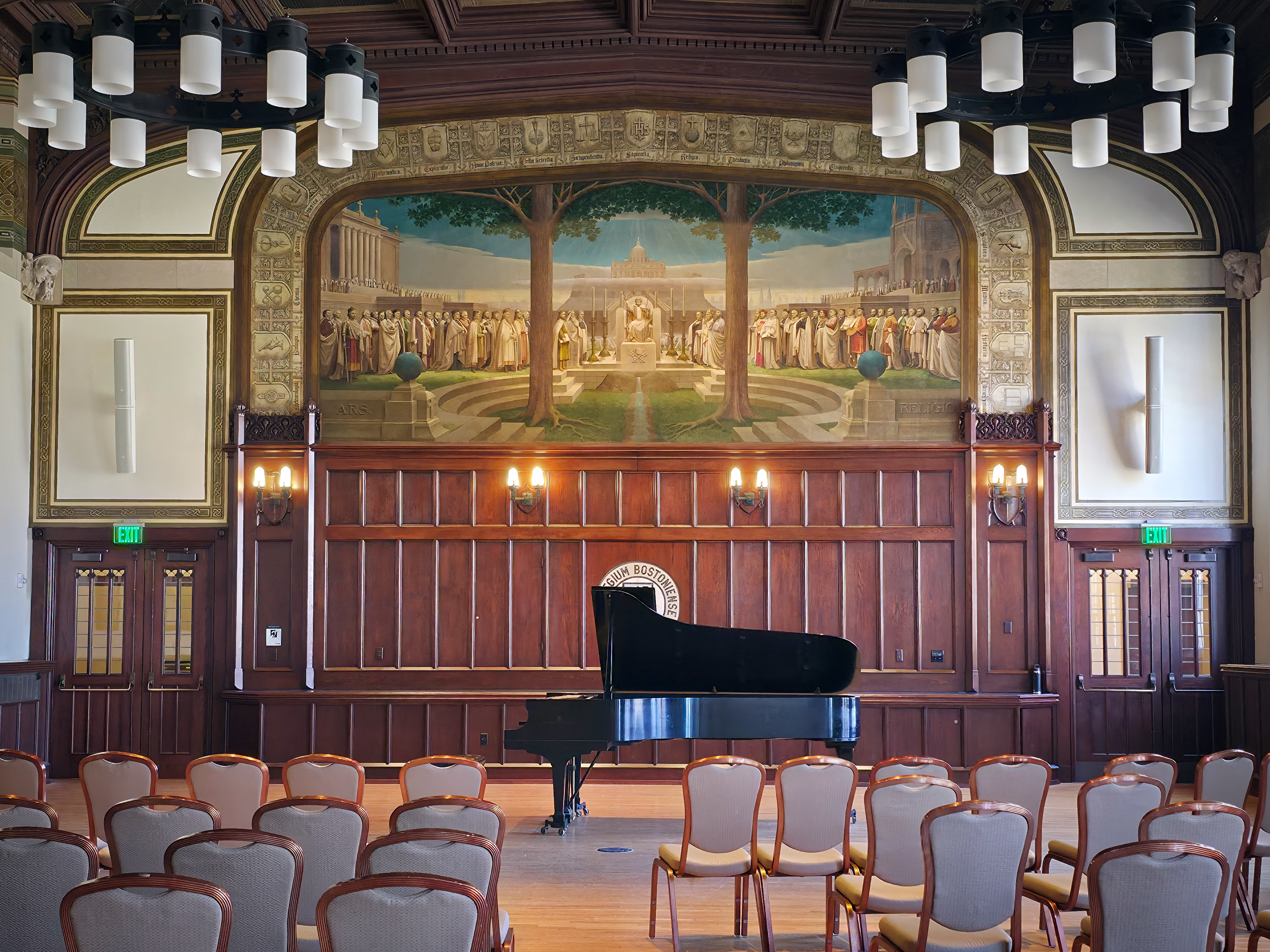
Francis Schroen, The Church, the Educator of Mankind, 1915

The first-floor assembly hall (Gasson 100) features a monumental mural entitled The Church, the Educator of Mankind. Completed by Schroen in 1915, it presents the Church as a radiant, divine intermediary between heaven and earth, anchored on the rock of Peter. At its base, Peter sits enthroned, embodying teaching and blessing, flanked by peaceful sheep symbolizing the faithful. On the right, on a terrace labeled "RELIGIO," figures associated with sacred arts and sciences advance toward Peter; on the left side, labeled "ARS," leaders in secular fields of law, science, medicine, and statesmanship process forward. In the background, great cathedrals and civic institutions symbolize the Church’s role in fostering both faith and learning. The composition underscores the Church’s foundational role in guiding human knowledge and culture, culminating in a celestial-terrestrial harmony. A border of seals represents each discipline, while a Gaelic inscription dedicates the hall to Boston College.

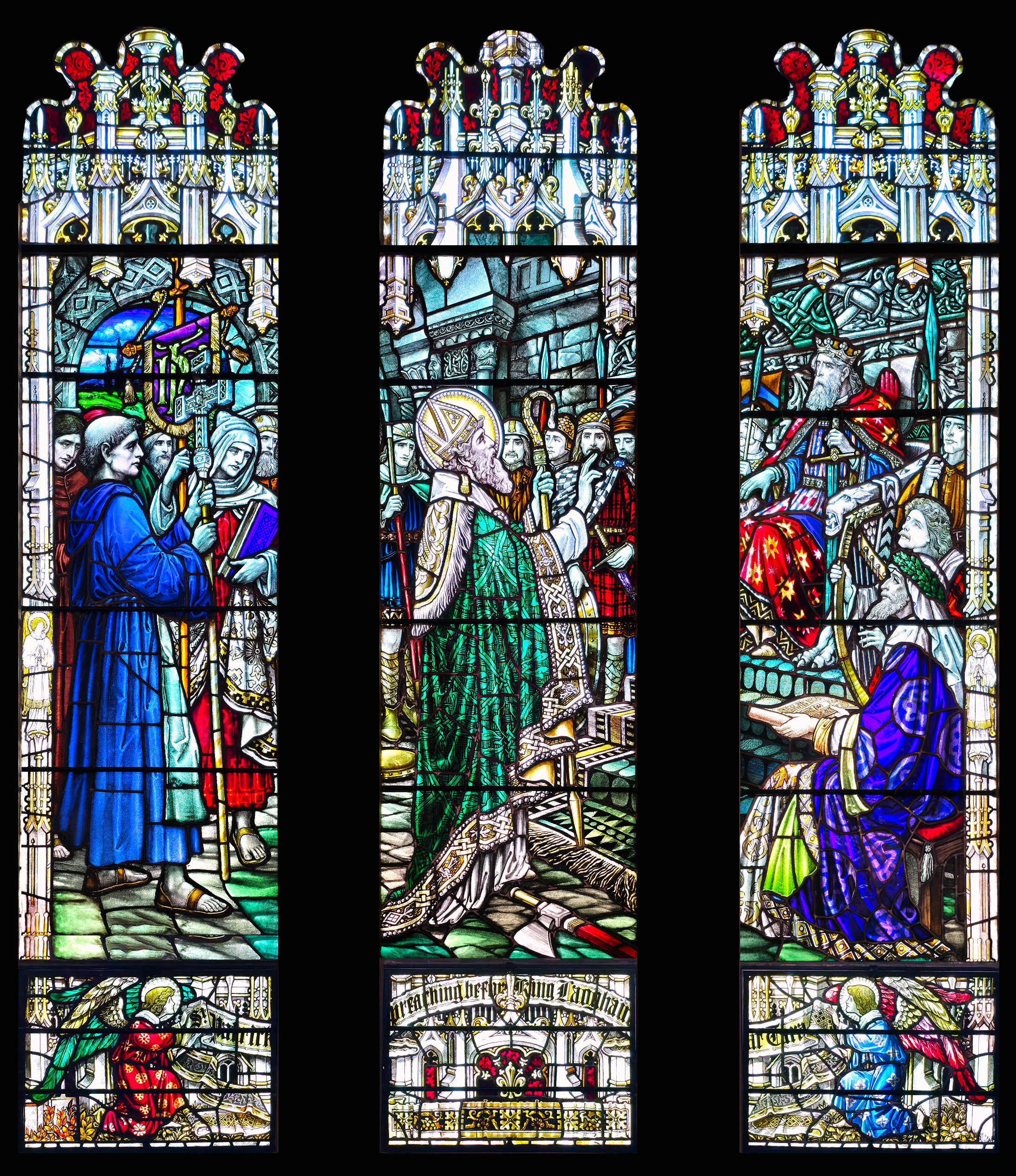
Thomas Murphy, St. Patrick Preaching to King Laoghaire, 1914

== Renovation ==
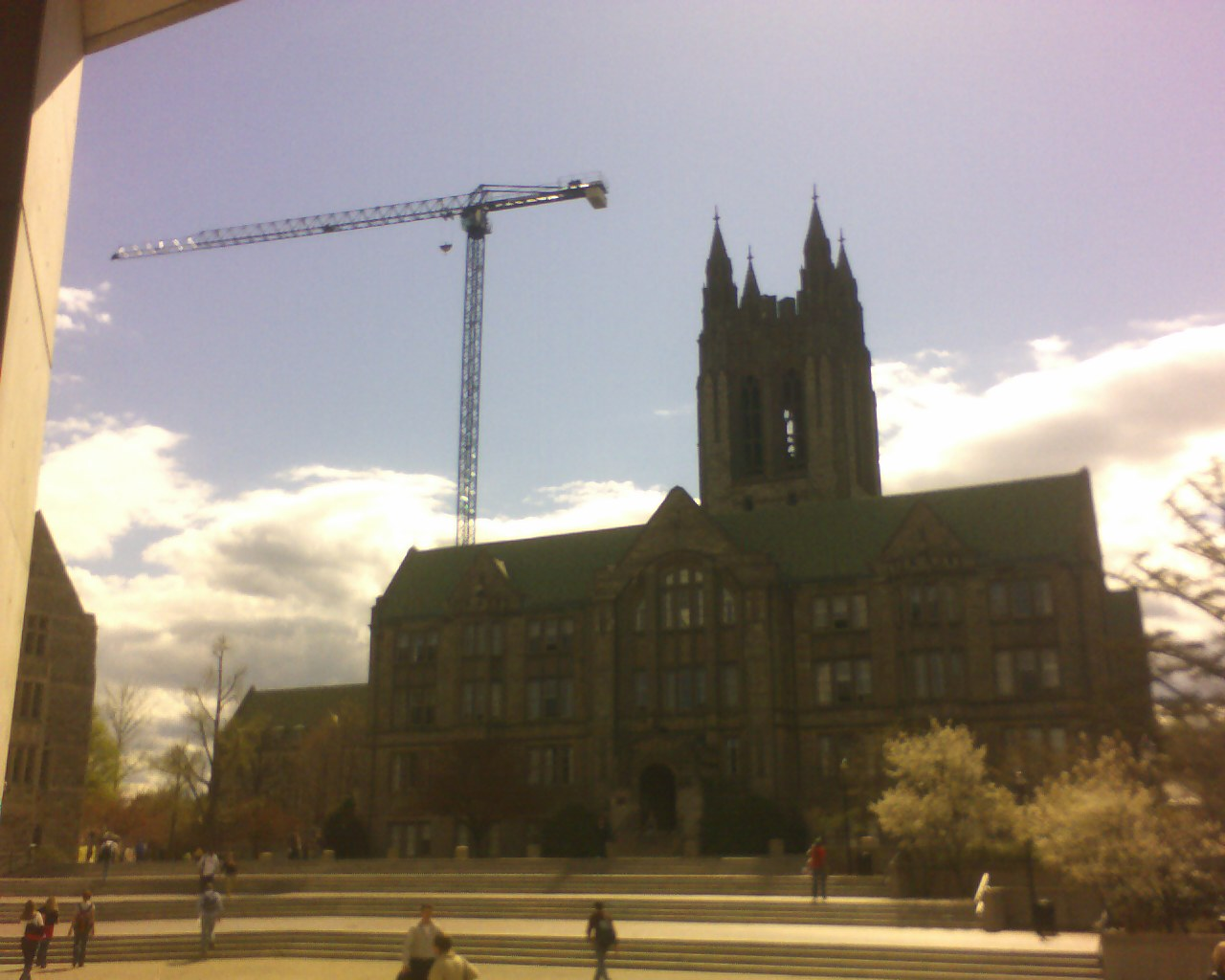
Gasson Hall renovations, May 2, 2007

Gasson Hall has been subject to major exterior renovations. The building's stone elements had been heavily weathered since the hall’s opening in 1913. Nearly every stone on the building had to be analyzed and documented for replacement. It was concluded that construction crews must replace nearly 99% of the building's decorative cast stones. The renovation consisted of several phases, the first focusing mainly on the building's 200 foot tall bell tower.

Crews attempted to replicate Gasson's Collegiate Gothic architecture by meticulously removing each of the cast stones and replacing them with exact replicas. Each of the tower's four prominent spires was removed via crane and shipped to a masonry company. The original spires were used to form molds. These molds were then used to create new stone spires, which could be attached to the building. Work on the bell tower was completed in autumn 2008, and work on the rest of the building was completed by September 2011.

== See also ==
- Collegiate Gothic
- Gothic revival architecture
