= William F. Gannon =

American Jesuit educator (1859–1916)

The Reverend William F. Gannon SJ
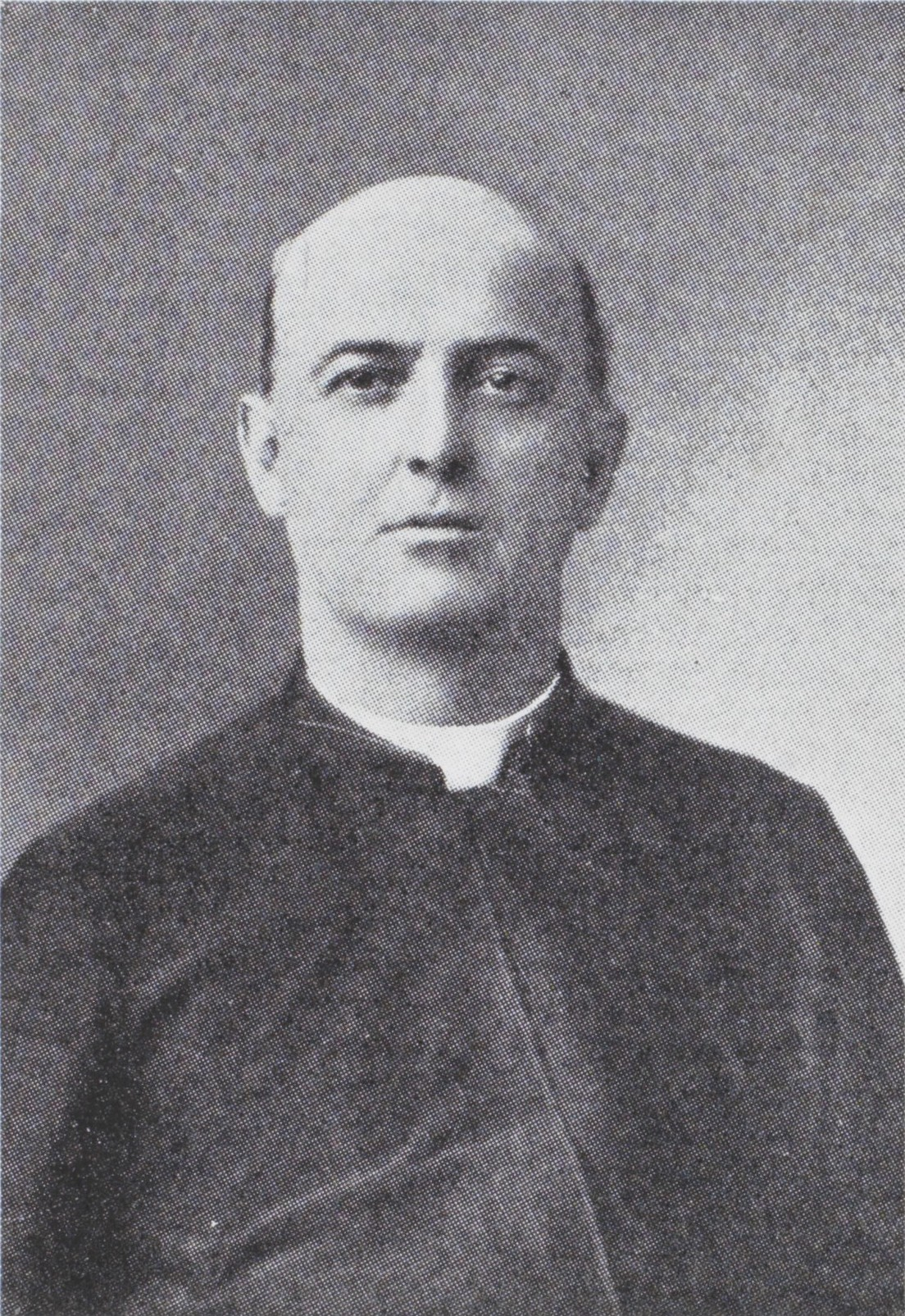
- Gannon c. 1903

12th President of Boston College
- In office 1903–1907
- Preceded by: W. G. Read Mullan
- Succeeded by: Thomas I. Gasson

Personal details
- Born: March 31, 1859 Cambridge, Massachusetts, U.S.
- Died: October 30, 1916 (aged 57) Philadelphia, Pennsylvania, U.S.
- Education: Woodstock College

Orders
- Ordination: June 1891

William F. Gannon SJ (March 31, 1859 – October 30, 1916) was an American Catholic priest and Jesuit who was the president of Boston College from 1903 to 1907. Born in Cambridge, Massachusetts, he entered the Society of Jesus in 1876 and studied at Woodstock College. He then taught at Jesuit schools, including the College of the Holy Cross, Saint Peter's College, Fordham University, and Georgetown University, before becoming president of Boston College. After his presidency, he engaged in pastoral work in New York City and Philadelphia.

== Early life ==
Gannon was born on March 31, 1859, in Cambridge, Massachusetts. He studied at Boston College High School and entered the Society of Jesus on August 5, 1876, proceeding to the Jesuit novitiate in Frederick, Maryland. After two years as a novice and two years in his classical studies, he went to Woodstock College to study philosophy.

== Jesuit formation ==
From 1883 to 1885, Gannon taught at the College of the Holy Cross in Worcester, Massachusetts. He then taught for two years at Saint Peter's College in Jersey City, New Jersey, and for one year at St. John's College in New York City (later renamed Fordham University). The subjects Gannon taught at Holy Cross and Fordham were mathematics and French. In 1888, Gannon returned to Woodstock College for his theological studies, and he was ordained a priest in June 1891.

In 1892, Gannon returned to the College of the Holy Cross as the prefect of discipline. The following year, he went to Maison St-Joseph, the Jesuit novitiate in Sault-au-Récollet (now a neighborhood of Montreal, Canada), where he completed his tertianship. For one year, in 1894, Gannon was the prefect of discipline at Georgetown University in Washington, D.C.

From 1895 to 1896, Gannon taught French at St. Francis Xavier College in New York City (later known as Xavier High School), where he professed his fourth vow on August 15, 1896. In 1897, he taught at Saint Peter's College in New Jersey, and was the prefect of studies for the academic year of 1898 to 1899. He then spent the next four years working on the Jesuit mission band. During this time, he developed a reputation as a skilled preacher.

== Boston College ==
On July 30, 1903, Gannon succeeded W. G. Read Mullan as the president of Boston College. During his presidency, Gannon was also the pastor of the Church of the Immaculate Conception in the South End of Boston. Diplomas were awarded to the graduates of Boston College High School for the first time in 1904. Gannon sought to expand the college's sports programs, and its intramural baseball team was re-established, but the lack of a gymnasium and a suitable athletic field hindered expansion.

Boston College was the largest Jesuit college and high school in the United States in 1900, but enrollment began to decline around this time, reaching a low of 335 combined students in 1904. Several students from St. Thomas Aquinas College in Cambridge, Massachusetts, transferred to Boston College when that school closed in 1905. Gannon was succeeded as president of Boston College by Thomas I. Gasson on January 6, 1907.

== Later years ==
From 1907 to 1908, Gannon engaged in pastoral work at the Church of St. Ignatius Loyola in Manhattan, New York City. He then went to St. Aloysius Church in Washington, D.C. and returned to St. Ignatius Loyola Church in 1913. In the summer of 1914, Gannon took up work at the Church of the Gesú in Philadelphia, Pennsylvania, as a confessor and the director of the married men's sodality. He had planned to reorganize the sodality to bring it into accordance with the rules for sodalities prescribed in 1910 by the Jesuit Superior General, Franz Xavier Wernz, primarily to compile a list of members. However, he did not live to implement his plans. In August 1916, he became the director of the church's Senior Holy Name Society.

On October 30, 1916, Gannon suffered a stroke and died in Philadelphia. On November 1, his funeral was held in the chapel of Saint Joseph's College. Sixth months after his death, the consultors of the married men's sodality completed a list of members, numbering 222, and reconsecrated those members.

Academic offices
Preceded by W. G. Read Mullan	12th President of Boston College; 1903–1907	Succeeded by Thomas I. Gasson
Catholic Church titles
Preceded by W. G. Read Mullan	13th Pastor of the Church of the Immaculate Conception; 1903–1907	Succeeded by Thomas I. Gasson
