= Boston College Morrissey College of Arts and Sciences =

Morrissey College
- Constituent college
- Boston College
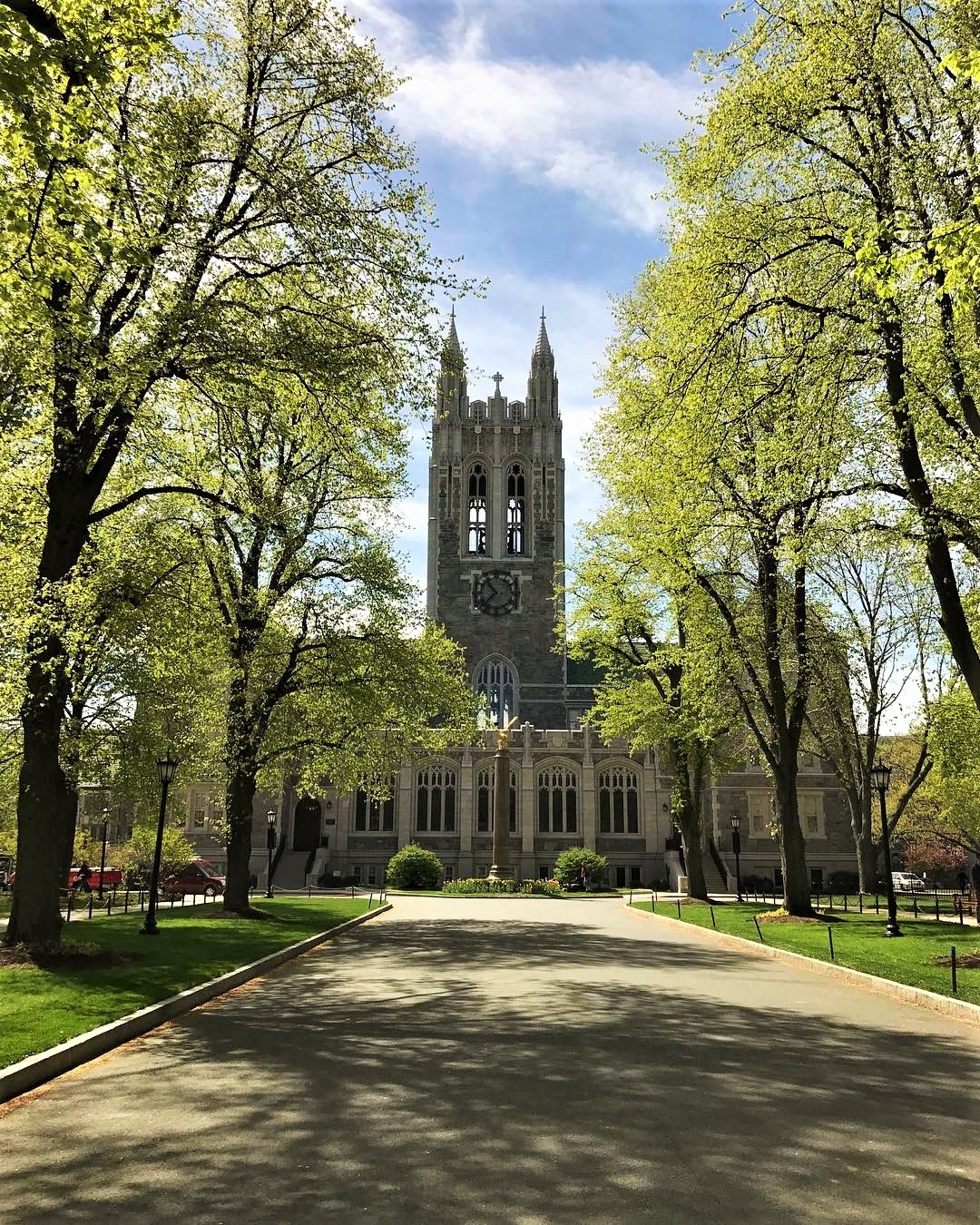
- Gasson Hall

- Location: Chestnut Hill, Massachusetts, U.S.
- Full name: Robert J. Morrissey College of Arts and Sciences
- Established: March 31, 1863; 163 years ago
- Named for: Robert J. Morrisey
- Gender: Co-educational
- Dean: Fr. Gregory Kalscheur, S.J.
- Undergraduates: 6,097
- Postgraduates: 732
- Website: bc.edu/mcas

The Boston College Morrissey College of Arts and Sciences (MCAS) is the oldest and largest constituent college of Boston College, situated on the university's main campus in Chestnut Hill, Massachusetts. Founded in 1863, it offers undergraduate and graduate programs in the humanities, social sciences, and natural sciences.

In the tradition of liberal arts education, the college offers 37 programs leading to bachelor's, master's and doctoral degrees. Enrollment includes more than 6,000 undergraduate and nearly 800 graduate students.

== History ==
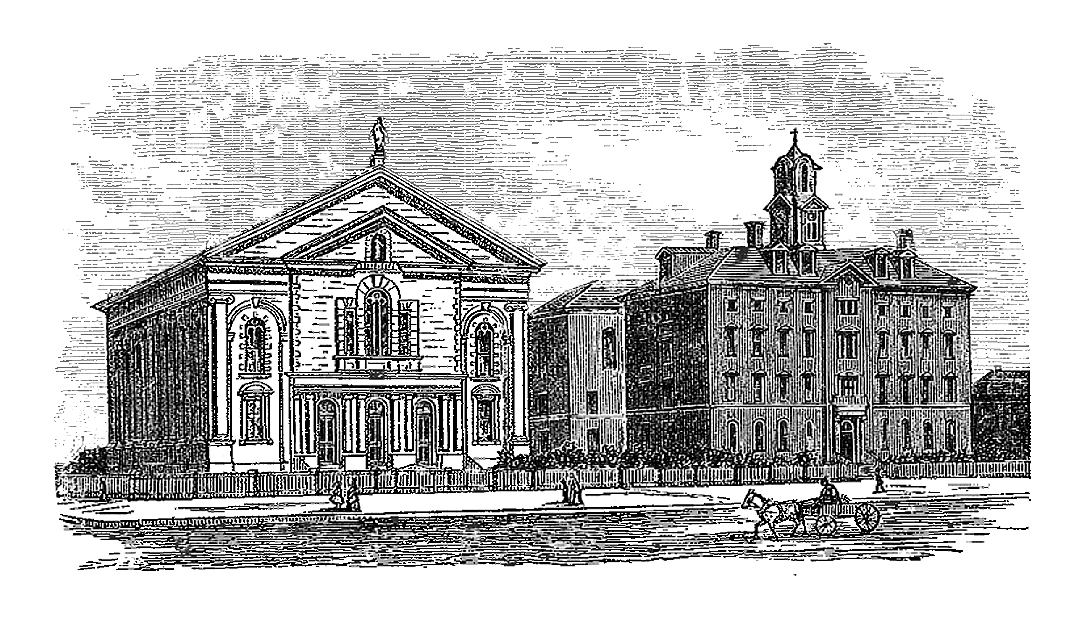
Early BC in Boston's South End

Founded by the Society of Jesus and chartered by the Commonwealth of Massachusetts in 1863, Morrissey College is the original school of Boston College. Its charter provided that no student could be refused admission "on account of the religious opinions he may entertain." Three Jesuit instructors and 22 students, all males mostly from Boston's marginalized Irish Catholic immigrant community, made up the college when it opened its doors on September 5, 1864. Robert Fulton, S.J., an alumnus of Georgetown University, served as Morrissey College's first dean and later president. Nine students received A.B. degrees, the first bachelor's degrees awarded, in 1877.

Morrissey College was originally located in the block between Harrison Avenue and James Street in Boston's South End neighborhood. It shared quarters with its preparatory school, Boston College High School that became separately incorporated in 1927. By the turn of the century, the college had outgrown its urban setting and a new location was selected in mostly rural Chestnut Hill. The Boston firm of Maginnis and Walsh broke ground at the highest point of Chestnut Hill on June 19, 1909, for the construction of Gasson Hall. It was the first of several buildings designed in one of the earliest examples of collegiate Gothic architecture in North America. Claver, Loyola, and Xavier were the first residential halls constructed on the university's upper campus in 1955.

Boston College remained an exclusively liberal arts institution, with emphasis on the Greek and Latin classics, English and modern languages, philosophy and religion, for the first several decades after its founding. In 1925, the Graduate School of Arts and Sciences was formed, followed by programs at the doctoral level in 1952, establishing Boston College's role as a leading research university.

In September 1933, Casper Augustus Ferguson enrolled in Morrissey College and four years later became the first black student to graduate from Boston College. By 1970 all Boston College undergraduate programs, including at Morrissey College, had become coeducational.

Stokes Hall, a humanities building that houses several arts and sciences departments, was completed in 2013. In 2015, the School of Arts & Sciences and Graduate School of Arts & Sciences were renamed Morrissey College of Arts & Sciences in honor of benefactor and alumnus Robert J. Morrissey, class of 1960.

== Academics ==
=== Departments ===
- Art, art history, and film
- Biology
- Chemistry
- Classical studies
- Communication
- Computer science
- Earth and environmental sciences
- Eastern, Slavic, and German Studies
- Economics
- Engineering
- English
- German studies
- History
- Mathematics
- Music
- Philosophy
- Physics
- Political science
- Psychology and neuroscience
- Romance languages and literatures
- Sociology
- Theatre
- Theology

=== Interdisciplinary programs ===
- African and African diaspora studies
- American studies
- Asian studies
- Asian American studies
- Biochemistry
- Environmental studies
- International studies
- Irish studies
- Islamic civilization and societies
- Jewish studies
- Latin American studies
- Medical humanities
- Women's and gender studies
