= List of Saint Joseph's University buildings =

The following is a list of the buildings on the campus of Saint Joseph's University, Hawk Hill, located in Philadelphia, Pennsylvania, United States.

== Academic buildings ==
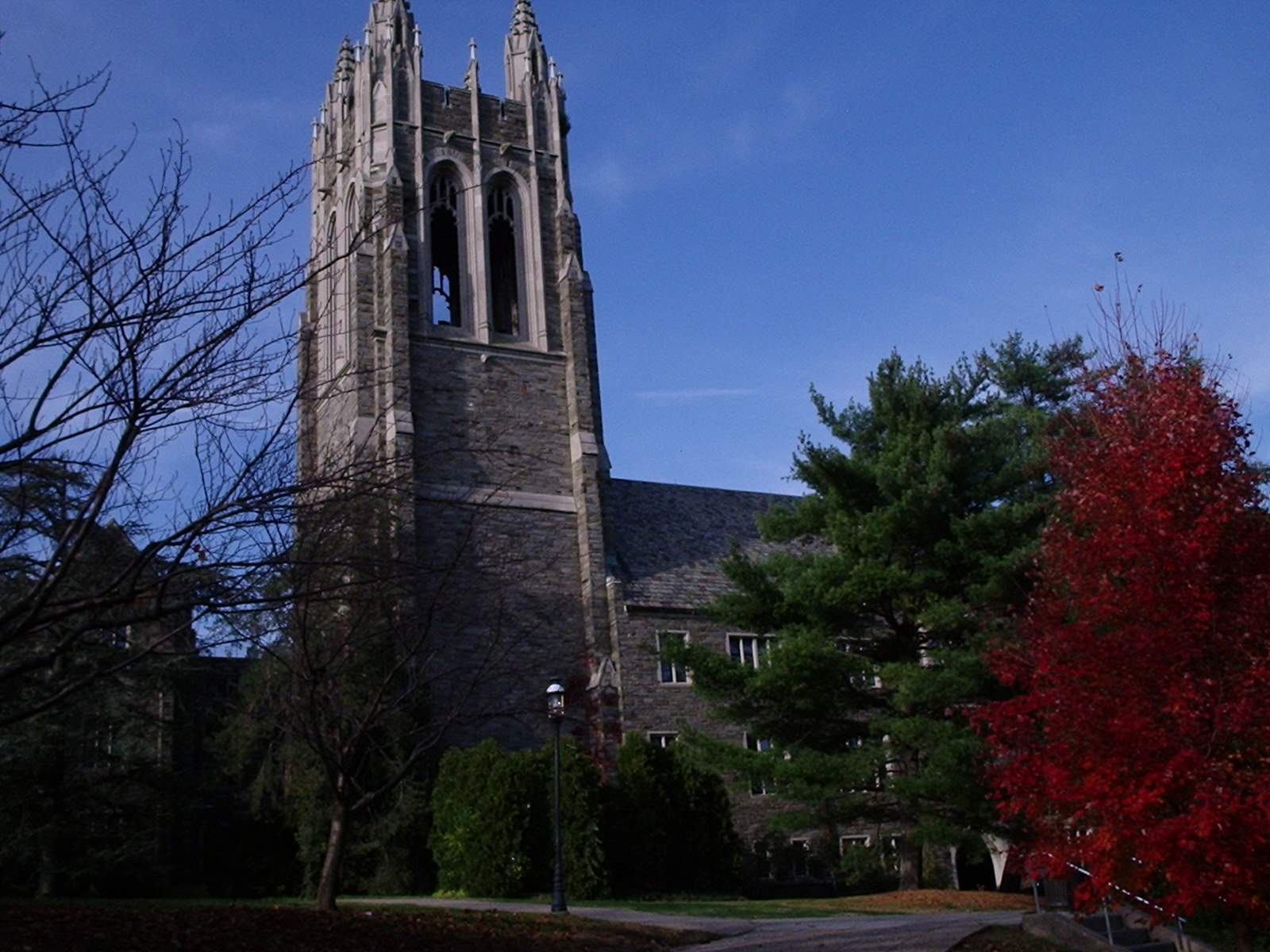
Barbelin Hall

- Barbelin Hall, College of Arts & Sciences building; named in honor of Rev. Felix-Joseph Barbelin, S.J., first president of SJU
- Bellarmine Hall, foreign Language and Arts & Sciences building named in honor of Saint Robert Bellarmine S.J.
- Connelly Hall, math and science building named for the area of Lower Merion it is located in
- ELS Building, home of offices for international students
- Francis A. Drexel Library, named in honor of benefactor Francis Drexel
- Mandeville Hall, home of the Haub School of Business, named in honor of businessman Owen A. Mandeville
- Merion Hall, named for its location in Lower Merion Township; academic building; home of the English department
- Post Hall, sociology, psychology, and fine arts building named in honor of benefactor and alum John R. Post
- Post Learning Commons, structurally joined to Drexel Library
- ROTC Building, home to the Air Force ROTC
- Science Center

== Administrative buildings ==
- Bronstein Hall, home of the communications department
- Claver House, named in honor of Saint Peter Claver, home of the honors department
- Human Resources and University Communications, home of the human resources office
- Loyola Center, named in honor of Ignatius of Loyola, home of the Jesuits
- Regis Hall, President's Office, named in honor of Saint John Francis Regis
- Saint Thomas Hall, named in honor of Saint Thomas Aquinas, home of the financial aid office
- University Press, home of the Saint Joseph's University Press

== Arts and entertainment buildings ==
- Bluett Theater, home of the Cap and Bells Dramatic Arts Society located in Post Hall
- Boland Hall, home of the University Gallery
- Fine Arts East, home of art classrooms and offices
- Fine Arts West, home of art classrooms and offices

== Athletic buildings ==
- Hagan Arena, home of the Saint Joseph's Hawks
- O'Pake Recreation Center, home of intramural sports; located on the Maguire Campus; named in honor of Pennsylvania State Senator and alumnus Michael A. O'Pake '61
- Ramsay Basketball Center, home of offices and the men's and women's basketball teams
- Robert Gillin, Jr. Boathouse, home of the rowing teams, located on Boathouse Row
- Sports Complex, located next to the Fieldhouse; home of varsity sports

== Ministry buildings ==
- Chapel of Saint Joseph-Michael J. Smith S.J. Memorial, named in honor of the patron saint of the University and beloved professor and university member, respectively
- Wolfington Hall, named in honor of alum and benefactor Eustace Wolfington's mother; center for campus ministry

== Residence halls ==
- LaFarge Hall, named in honor of Rev. John LaFarge S.J. an advocate for racial equality; a six-story, co-ed hall built in 1970 which accommodates 350 students
- Moore Hall, named in honor of Rev. James W. Moore, S.J., longtime Associate Dean of the College of Arts and Sciences; a three-story, co-ed hall built in 1989 which accommodates 78 students; originally used by the Salvation Army
- Sourin Hall, named in honor of Rev. Edward Sourin, S.J., an early Philadelphia Jesuit, who fought to establish Catholic education in a time when Catholicism found little acceptance; a four-story, co-ed hall built in 1980 which accommodates 225 students; the Student Health Center is located on the ground floor
- McShain Hall, named in honor of John McShain, an alumnus who built Barbelin Hall as well as numerous buildings in Washington D.C.; a five-story, co-ed hall built in 1988 which accommodates 280 students; the City Avenue bridge connects the Lower Merion (and McShain) side of campus to the city side
- Villiger Hall, named in honor of Fr. Burchard Villiger S.J., who was on the faculty of Saint Joseph's from its founding in 1851 and fifth president of Saint Joseph's College; a 413-bed residence center located on the corner of City and Cardinal Avenues; completed in August 2012

=== Campus houses ===
- Hogan, acquired in 1964; accommodates 28 students
- Jordan, acquired in 1959; accommodates 30 students
- Quirk, acquired in 1948; accommodates 30 students
- Saint Albert's, named in honor of Saint Albert of Louvain; acquired in 1959; accommodates 21 students
- Saint Mary's, named in honor of the Blessed Mother; located on the Merion side of campus; accommodates 40 students
- Simpson, located on central campus; accommodates 24 students
- Sullivan, acquired in 1958; accommodates 27 students
- Tara, named for the seat of the ancient Irish Kings; acquired in 1949; accommodates 30 students
- Xavier, named in honor of Saint Francis Xavier S.J.; acquired in 1960; accommodates 24 students

=== University apartments and townhouses ===
- Ashwood, co-ed apartment; located on Overbrook Avenue; has a capacity for 170 students
- Lannon, named in honor of former president Rev. Timothy R. Lannon, S.J.; located next to Rashford; complex which houses 254 students)
- Merion Gardens, apartment complex on City Avenue on the Merion side; 216 students reside here
- Morris Quad Townhouses, opened in the fall of 1997; townhouses which accompany 116 students
- Pennbrook, located on 63rd and City Avenue across the street from Overbrook Station
- Rashford, named in honor of former president Rev. Nicholas Rashford, S.J.; located on City Avenue; apartment complex which houses 152 students

== Student life buildings ==
- Campion Student Center, named in honor of Saint Edmund Campion S.J.
- Campus Commons, located on the Maguire Campus; converted chapel; serves as an area for students to relax or study
- Hawks' Landing, home of the bookstore, Starbucks, and a six-story parking garage
- Paris Auditorium/Dining Hall, located on Maguire Campus; Black Box Theatre & Campus Dining Hall
- The Perch, has a lounge, games, pool tables, televisions, and a stage for students
