= Kevin Gillespie (academic) =

American academic and Jesuit priest

The Reverend Dr. C. Kevin Gillespie SJ

President of St. Joseph's University
- In office 2012–2015
- Preceded by: John Smithson
- Succeeded by: Mark Reed

Personal details
- Born: Philadelphia, Pennsylvania, U.S.
- Education: Saint Joseph's University; Duquesne University; Jesuit School of Theology Berkeley; Boston University
- Occupation: University president

Charles Kevin Gillespie, S.J. is an American academic and Jesuit priest who served as the 27th president of Saint Joseph's University from 2012 to 2015. He succeeded Timothy R. Lannon. Gillespie graduated from St. Joe's in 1972 and is native to the Philadelphia area.

== Early life and education ==
Gillespie received a bachelor's degree in psychology from St. Joseph's University as well as a master's degree in psychology from Duquesne University. He also received a master's degree in divinity from the Jesuit School of Theology Berkeley along with a Ph.D. in pastoral psychology from Boston University.

== Career ==
Gillespie worked at Loyola University Chicago as the associate provost in the University Centers of Excellence. Gillespie was the first alum to serve as university president in over a century.

Gillespie served as president of Saint Joseph's University from 2012 to 2015 and has been an active member of the university's board of trustees since 2006.

In 2015, he was appointed pastor of Holy Trinity Catholic Church in Washington, D.C.'s Georgetown neighborhood.
