= John P. Schlegel =

American higher education professional

Rev. John P. Schlegel, S.J.

23rd President of Creighton University
- In office 2000–2011
- Preceded by: Michael J. Morrison, S.J.
- Succeeded by: Timothy R. Lannon, S.J.

26th President of the University of San Francisco
- In office July 15, 1991 – 2000
- Preceded by: John Lo Schiavo, S.J.
- Succeeded by: Stephen A. Privett, SJ

Personal details
- Born: July 30, 1943 Dubuque, Iowa
- Died: November 15, 2015 (aged 72) Omaha, Nebraska
- Cause of death: Pancreatic cancer
- Education: Saint Louis University (B.A.), (M.A.); University of London (Theology Degree); University of Oxford (Ph.D.)
- Salary: Donated to charity because of vow of poverty
- Website: Office of the President

John P. Schlegel, S.J. (July 30, 1943 – November 15, 2015) was the 23rd president of Creighton University from 2000 to 2011. He formerly served as 26th president of the University of San Francisco from 1991 until 2000.

== Biography ==
Schlegel received his Bachelor of Arts in philosophy and classics from Saint Louis University in 1969. He then completed a master's degree in political science in 1970, also from Saint Louis University. Schlegel also holds a degree in theology, which he obtained from the University of London in 1973, and a doctorate in international relations from Oxford University, which he obtained in 1977.

Prior to his tenure at San Francisco and Creighton, Schlegel served as the dean of the College of Arts and Sciences at Marquette University in Milwaukee, Wisconsin, and later as executive and academic vice president of John Carroll University in Cleveland, Ohio. On October 17, 1991, Schlegel was named the president of the University of San Francisco, succeeding Father John Lo Schiavo, who had served as USF's president for the prior 14 years. He officially became the 26th president of the University of San Francisco on June 15, 1991.

In 2000, Schlegel was named president of Creighton University in Omaha. Schlegel is credited with increasing student enrollment during his tenure at Creighton University. He also shepherded a $400 million capital campaign and oversaw the acquisition of 40 acres (160,000 m^{2}) of land located east of the existing campus.

In July 2010, Schlegel announced his intent to retire as president of Creighton University at the end of the 2010–2011 academic year. On July 1, 2011, he was succeeded by Father Timothy R. Lannon, who was the previous president of Saint Joseph's University.

Schlegel served as the pastor of Church of the Gesu on Marquette's campus from 2014-2015. On November 15, 2015, Schlegel died as a result of pancreatic cancer.
