= List of presidents of Saint Joseph's University =

This article is a list of presidents of Saint Joseph's University, located in Philadelphia, Pennsylvania.

1. Felix-Joseph Barbelin (1851–1856)
2. James A. Ryder (1856–1857)
3. James A. Ward (1857–1860)
4. Felix-Joseph Barbelin (1860–1868)
5. Burchard Villiger (1868–1893)
6. Patrick J. Dooley (1893–1896)
7. William F. Clark (1896–1900)
8. Cornelius Gillespie (1900–1907)
9. Denis T. O'Sullivan (1907–1908)
10. Cornelius Gillespie (1908–1909)
11. Charles W. Lyons (1909–1914)
12. J. Charles Davey (1914–1917)
13. Redmond J. Walsh (1917–1920)
14. Patrick F. O'Gorman (1920–1921)
15. Albert G. Brown (1921–1927)
16. William T. Tallon (1927–1933)
17. Thomas J. Higgins (1933–1939)
18. Thomas J. Love (1939–1944)
19. John J. Long (1944–1950)
20. Edward G. Jacklin (1950–1956)
21. J. Joseph Bluett (1956–1962)
22. William F. Maloney (1962–1968)
23. Terrence Toland (1968–1976)
24. Donald I. MacLean (1976–1986)
25. Nicholas S. Rashford (1986–2003)
26. Timothy R. Lannon (2003–2011)
27. John Smithson (2011–2012), interim
28. Kevin Gillespie (2012–2015)
29. Mark C. Reed (2015–2022)
30. Cheryl A. McConnell (2022–present)
