= Cheryl McConnell =

29th President of St. Joseph's University
- Incumbent
- Assumed office March 2023; Interim: August 2022 – February 2023
- Preceded by: Mark Reed

Personal details
- Education: Wichita State University (BBA); Saint Louis University (PhD)

Cheryl A. McConnell is an American accountant and academic administrator serving as the 29th president of Saint Joseph's University since 2022. She is the first laywoman to hold the role in the university’s history.

== Early life and education ==
McConnell earned a Bachelor of Business Administration with a major in accounting and a Master of Professional Accountancy from Wichita State University. She completed a Ph.D. in higher education administration from Saint Louis University. McConnell is also a certified public accountant and a certified fraud examiner. She is a first-generation college graduate.

== Career ==
McConnell has worked in Jesuit higher education for 35 years. She began her career at Rockhurst University where she held leadership positions, including dean of the College of Business, Influence, and Information Analysis, and the Helzberg School of Management, as well as associate provost for academic affairs.

In 2019, McConnell joined Saint Joseph's University as provost and senior vice president for academic affairs, where she focused on expanding academic programs, diversity initiatives, and strategic planning. In August 2022, McConnell was appointed interim president following the departure of Mark C. Reed. She was formally named the 29th president of Saint Joseph's University in March 2023, becoming the first laywoman to hold the position in the institution’s 172-year history.

As president, McConnell led the integration of the University of the Sciences in 2022 and the merger with the Pennsylvania College of Health Sciences in 2024. She has also served on various academic and civic boards, including the Association of Independent Colleges and Universities of Pennsylvania and the Council of Presidents for the Atlantic 10 Conference. McConnell was appointed to Pennsylvania’s State Board of Higher Education and Philadelphia’s Eds and Meds Roundtable.
