= John Smithson (university president) =

American college administrator

Interim President of Saint Joseph's University
- In office May 18, 2011 – June 30, 2012
- Preceded by: Timothy R. Lannon, S.J.

Personal details
- Education: Saint Joseph's University
- Profession: Academic administrator, retired Naval officer

John W. Smithson is an American college administrator who has served as the interim President of Saint Joseph's University in Philadelphia, Pennsylvania, from May 18, 2011, until June 30, 2012. He is the first president of Saint Joseph's University who is not a member of the Jesuits.

Smithson is a resident of Washington Crossing, Pennsylvania. He received his bachelor's degree in mathematics in 1968 and his MBA from Saint Joseph's University. Smithson also graduated from Officer Candidate School in Rhode Island and served as a U. S. Naval Officer from 1968 until 1972.

Smithson served on the Saint Joseph's University board of trustees from 1999 until 2007. He simultaneously served as chairman of the board from 2003 to 2007. In February 2010, Saint Joseph's University named Smithson as its senior vice president. His responsibilities as vice president included alumni relations, financial affairs, internal audits and external affairs.

In 2010, Saint Joseph's University's then president, Rev. Timothy R. Lannon, S.J., announced his departure at the end of the 2010–2011 academic year to become President of Creighton University. The university board of trustees initially selected Rev. Joseph O'Keefe, dean of the Lynch School of Education at Boston College, to succeed Lannon as Saint Joseph's 27th president. However, O'Keefe withdrew from the nomination several months before taking office citing health concerns, including "serious cardiovascular issues."

On April 25, 2011, the university board of trustees selected Saint Joseph's Senior Vice President John Smithson as interim president of the university. Smithson took office effective May 18, 2011, on an interim basis. Smithson's term ended July 1, 2012, when Rev. C. Kevin Gillespie, S.J., took over as the University's 27th President.
