= Mark Reed (academic) =

American academic administrator

Mark Cher. Reed

25th President of Loyola University Chicago
- Incumbent
- Assumed office October 1, 2022
- Preceded by: Jo Ann Rooney

President of St. Joseph's University
- In office July 1, 2015 – September 30, 2022
- Preceded by: C. Kevin Gillespie, S.J.
- Succeeded by: Cheryl McConnell

Personal details
- Born: Philadelphia, Pennsylvania, U.S.
- Education: Fairfield University; Boston College; University of Pennsylvania

Mark C. Reed is an American academic administrator who is the 25th president of Loyola University of Chicago in Chicago. Prior to his tenure at Loyola, Reed served as the first lay president of Saint Joseph's University in Philadelphia.

== Early life and education ==
Reed was born in Philadelphia, and grew up in Huntingdon Valley, Pennsylvania. In 1992, he graduated from St. Joseph's Preparatory School in Philadelphia. He earned a B.S. in mathematics from Fairfield University in Fairfield, Connecticut, in 1996, where he was elected student-body president and received the Loyola Medal in recognition of his outstanding service to the university.

He went on to earn an M.Ed. in secondary school administration from the Boston College Lynch School of Education in 1999, an MBA from the Fairfield University Dolan School of Business in 2002, and an Ed.D. in higher education management from the University of Pennsylvania Graduate School of Education at the University of Pennsylvania in 2008.

== Career ==
Prior to serving at Loyola University Chicago and St. Joseph's University, Reed spent 15-years at Fairfield University in various administrative roles before rising to the position of senior vice president and chief of staff. He was also an adjunct professor in the mathematics department. In 2015, Reed received the Fairfield University Distinguished Faculty/Administrator Award.
