= Paul J. Fitzgerald =

The Reverend Paul J. Fitzgerald
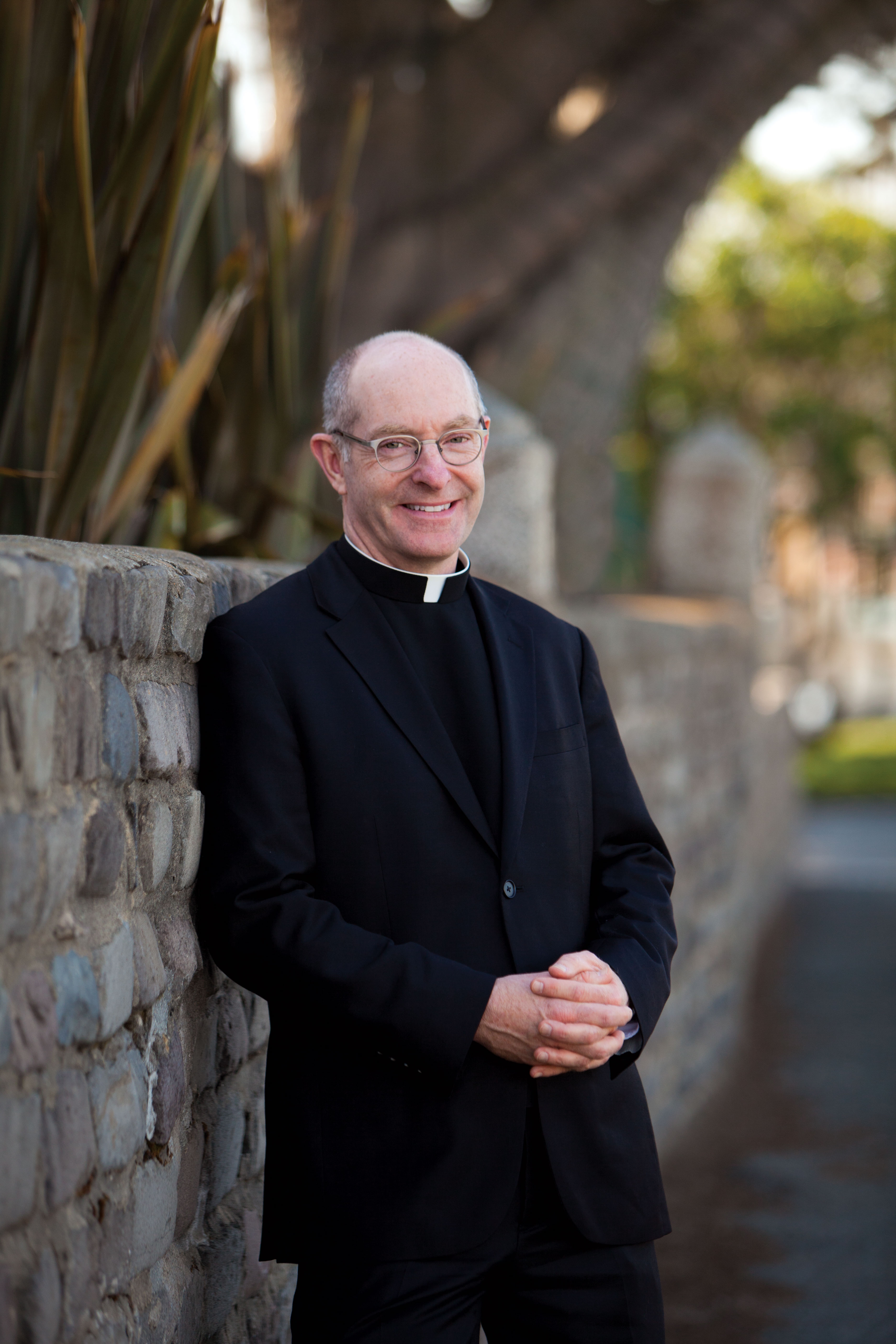

28th President of the University of San Francisco
- In office August 1, 2014 – December 31, 2024
- Preceded by: Stephen Privett, S.J.

Personal details
- Born: Burbank, California
- Education: Santa Clara University

Paul Joseph Fitzgerald, S.J. is a Roman Catholic priest and member of the Society of Jesus. Father Fitzgerald is the 28th president of the University of San Francisco.

== Biography ==
Fitzgerald was the 28th President of the University of San Francisco. Before coming to USF, he served as the Senior Vice President for Academic Affairs at Fairfield University. He has lived, studied and worked in Germany, France, Switzerland, Mexico, China and Kenya. His academic accomplishments include doctoral degrees in Theology and in the Sociology of Religion, a long list of publications, more than twenty years of college level instruction and more than a decade of higher education administrative experience.
