= Stephen Privett =

Rev. Stephen A. Privett, S.J.

27th President of the University of San Francisco
- In office September 15, 2000 – July 31, 2014
- Preceded by: John P. Schlegel, S.J.
- Succeeded by: Paul J. Fitzgerald, S.J.

Personal details
- Born: 1942 (age 83–84) San Francisco, California
- Education: Gonzaga University (B.A.); Jesuit School of Theology at Berkeley (M.A.); Catholic University of America (Ph.D.)

The Reverend Stephen Arena Privett, S.J. (/prɪˈvɛt/ priv-ET; born 1942 San Francisco, California) is a Roman Catholic priest and member of the Society of Jesus. Father Privett was the 27th president of the University of San Francisco. Father Privett currently serves as the 5th President of Verbum Dei High School, a member of the Cristo Rey Network of schools. He was inaugurated as President of Verbum Dei High School on September 18, 2018.

== Biography ==
Rev. Stephen A. Privett, S.J., began his tenure as the 27th president of the University of San Francisco on September 15, 2000.

On September 30, 2013, Father Privett announced he will step down as president. Rev. Paul J. Fitzgerald, S.J. was elected the 28th president of the University of San Francisco on April 8, 2014. Father Privett ended his tenure as president of USF on July 31, 2014. He was elected President Emeritus by the Board of Trustees on June 2, 2014, effective upon the conclusion of his tenure as president. He is currently serving as Chancellor of the university.

Born in San Francisco, California, Father Privett joined the Society of Jesus in 1960 and was ordained a priest in 1972. He holds a bachelor's degree from Gonzaga University, a master's of Divinity from the Jesuit School of Theology at Berkeley, and a doctorate in catechetics from The Catholic University of America in Washington, D.C.His doctorate is in Catechetics and his particular expertise focuses on the Hispanic community in the Catholic Church.

He has served as an instructor and principal at Bellarmine College Preparatory in San Jose, California and associate professor at Santa Clara University. While at Santa Clara, Father Privett was appointed academic vice-president in 1991 and provost in 1997. As provost, he was responsible for oversight of student life, intercollegiate athletics, as well as academic affairs. While teaching at Santa Clara, he was recognized for “Teaching Excellence and Campus Leadership” with the Sears Roebuck Foundation Award.

In 2000, Father Privett was elected president of the University of San Francisco, succeeding Father John Schlegel, S.J., who left to become the president of Creighton University.

In 2001 he effectively dismantled the original Saint Ignatius Institute when he summarily fired Director John Galten and Associate Director John Hamlon, allegedly to trim costs. His other reason was because the two were not believed to be qualified to head an academic program, despite the fact that they had been doing so for many years. Most of the SII's faculty resigned in protest. The affair received national media coverage. Orthodox Catholic leaders around the world expressed support for Galten; they included former U.S. Secretary of Education, William J. Bennett, and Michael Novak of the American Enterprise Institute, in a full-page ad published in the San Francisco Chronicle and elsewhere. In a memo published nationally, Privett responded to criticism of his decision, stating that the replacement of the SII's leadership would promote "synergies between St. Ignatius Institute and other university programs" and create "efficiencies by consolidating resources." He held a conference with students to assure them that the SII would continue as a Great Books curriculum with qualified instructors. The program today bears resemblance to the original mostly in name alone.

In January 2007, Privett offered the Invocation at the opening of the 110th Congress and the swearing in of Nancy Pelosi as Speaker of the United States House of Representatives.

Privett has received criticism and praise for his 2009 decision to eliminate USF's Master in Theology Program. Father Privett approved the sale of community radio station K.U.S.F. in January 2011.

Privett currently serves as a trustee at Fairfield University and St. Ignatius College Prep in San Francisco. He chairs the California Campus Compact and serves on the boards of the Commonwealth Club, the Fromm Institute, Jesuit Commons: Higher Education at the Margins and The Beijing Center. He is commissioner for the WASC Senior College and University Commission. He also serves on the advisory board of the California Foundation and is an honorary member of the San Francisco Host Committee.

At Santa Clara, Privett helped establish the Eastside Project, a program that received national recognition as a model program for community-based learning.
