= Daniel S. Hendrickson =

The Reverend Daniel S. Hendrickson SJ
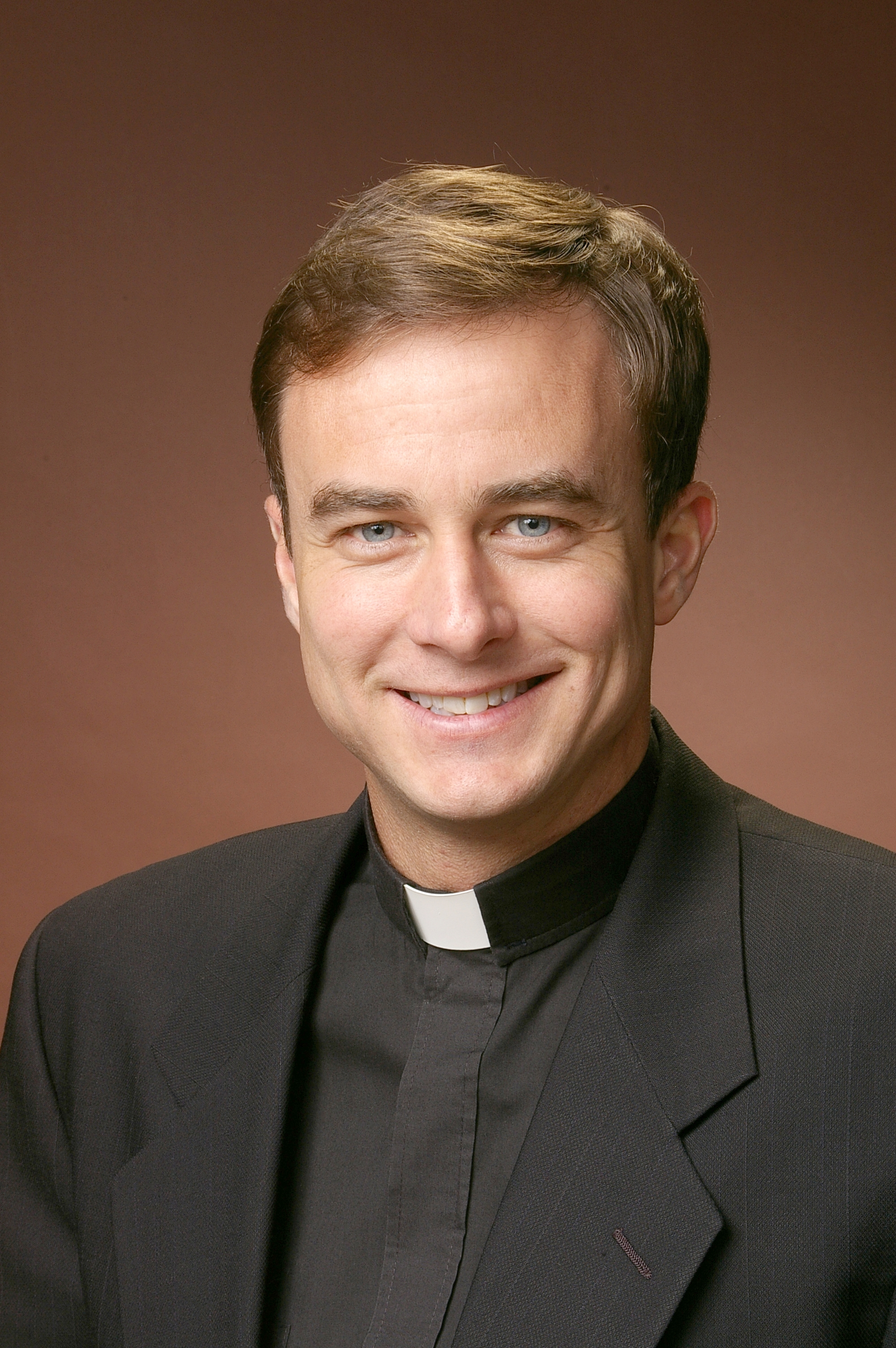

25th President of Creighton University
- Incumbent
- Assumed office July 1, 2015
- Preceded by: Timothy R. Lannon; Christopher Bradberry (interim)

Personal details
- Born: October 4, 1970 (age 56) Fremont, Nebraska, U.S.
- Education: Marquette University (BA); Fordham University (MA); Jesuit School of Theology of Santa Clara University (MDiv); Columbia University (MA)
- Profession: Jesuit priest, academic
- Website: https://www.creighton.edu/office-of-the-president

Daniel Scott Hendrickson SJ (born October 4, 1970) is an American Catholic priest and academic who has served as the 25th president of Creighton University since 2015. He was previously the associate provost for academic initiatives at Marquette University. He is a member of the Jesuits.

== Biography ==
=== Early life ===
Daniel S. Hendrickson is a native of Fremont, Nebraska, and graduated from Mount Michael Benedictine High School in Elkhorn, Nebraska. He comes from a family of educators. Daniel's identical twin is Darin Scott Hendrickson, a Loyola University Chicago assistant professor of modern languages. Daniel's older brother Ryan Hendrickson is the President of the University of St. Francis in Joliet, Illinois.

=== Education ===
Hendrickson graduated from Marquette in 1993 with a bachelor's degree in psychology and theology. Hendrickson holds three master's degrees: from Fordham University a MA in philosophical resources, from Jesuit School of Theology of Santa Clara University a Master of Divinity, and a MA from Columbia University.

Holding a doctorate in the Philosophy of Education from Columbia's Teachers College he wrote his dissertation, The Jesuit Imaginary: Higher Education in a Secular Age, on the work of the Canadian philosopher Charles Taylor and the Renaissance humanist elements of education in the Jesuit tradition.

=== Career ===
Hendrickson entered the Jesuits in 1994. He was ordained a Catholic priest of the Society of Jesus in 2006.

Hendrickson returned to Marquette University in 2012 as the Associate Vice President in the Office of the Executive Vice President, and then in 2014 became an Associate Provost for Academic Initiatives. Although never having served as a university president before, Hendrickson is confident in his ability to lead. At Marquette, in his role in the provost's office, he also co-directed a service leadership scholarship program, oversaw an enrollment growth initiative and managed expansion of the Title IX compliance office.

=== President of Creighton University ===
Hendrickson became the 25th president of Creighton University, a Jesuit, Catholic university in Omaha, Nebraska, on July 1, 2015. Hendrickson's predecessor, Timothy R. Lannon retired in January 2015, with J. Christopher Bradberry, Dean of the School of Pharmacy and Health Professions, named as interim president, until Hendrickson's arrival in July 2015. He presided at his first public Mass as president on the Solemnity of St. Ignatius of Loyola, founder of the Society of Jesus, July 31, 2015, at St. John's Parish (Omaha, Nebraska).

Hendrickson has been affiliated with Creighton University since he was in the Jesuit Humanities Program in 1996. From 2000 to 2003, Hendrickson returned as an adjunct philosophy instructor and briefly served as an adjunct professor with Creighton's Institute for Latin American Concern (ILAC) program in Santiago, Dominican Republic for a year. Elected to the Creighton University Board of Trustees in 2013 he also serves on the boards of Boston College and Xavier University.

==== Inauguration ====
The inauguration events for the 25th President, Hendrickson, took place on Thursday, October 1, 2015, and Friday, October 2, 2015. The Missioning Mass began the festivities of the inauguration. The principal celebrant for the Missioning Mass was Thomas A. Lawler, Provincial of the Wisconsin Province of the Society of Jesus. Those in attendance included retired Abbot Raphael Walsh and Abbot Theodore Wolff of Mount Michael Benedictine Abbey, the William Dendinger, and the two Jesuit Provincials of the Midwest USA province of the Society of Jesus, Brian Paulson (Chicago-Detroit Provincial) and Thomas A. Lawler (Wisconsin Provincial). (These two provinces merged in the summer of 2017 to form the Midwest USA Province of the Society of Jesus.) Liturgy Coordinator for the Missioning Mass was Keith Kozak. The inauguration took place on Friday, October 2, 2015, with various dignitaries and honored guests, including George Lucas, Archbishop of Omaha.

==== Creighton Global Initiative ====
Hendrickson has a special interest in education with a global perspective. His international travel and immersion experiences have taken him to over 30 countries on nearly every continent. A Distinct Presidential Initiative was created in 2016 almost immediately after taking office. A priority of Hendrickson's presidency is the Creighton Global Initiative. Although Creighton already has a firm foundation of various programs in the global and education communities, there is a desire through this initiative that Creighton will build upon current academic and institutional efforts and creatively envision and implement new ones.

Creighton Global Initiative (CGI) will strengthen existing Creighton projects and programs, increase support for and build up the Global Engagement Office (GEO), and CGI will create a funding pool, housed at the GEO, to which the Creighton community may apply for financial and departmental support.

=== Personal life ===
On February 11, 2025, Hendrickson was named a Nebraska Admiral, which is the state of Nebraska's highest civic honor, and an honorary title bestowed upon individuals by approval of the Governor of Nebraska.

Academic offices
Preceded by –	Associate Vice President in the Office of the Executive Vice President at Marquette University; 2012–2013	Succeeded by –
Preceded by –	Associate Provost for Academic Initiatives at Marquette University; 2013–2016	Succeeded by –
Preceded by Timothy R. Lannon	President of Creighton University; 2015–present	Incumbent
