= Timothy R. Lannon =

Timothy R. Lannon, S.J.

24th President of Creighton University
- In office July 1, 2011 – January 20, 2015
- Preceded by: John P. Schlegel, S.J.
- Succeeded by: J. Christopher Bradberry, Pharm. D. (interim); Daniel S. Hendrickson, S.J. (permanent)

26th President of Saint Joseph's University
- In office 2003 – May 18, 2011
- Preceded by: Nicholas S. Rashford, S.J.
- Succeeded by: John Smithson

Personal details
- Education: Creighton University; Harvard Graduate School of Education
- Profession: Jesuit priest, academic

Timothy Ryan Lannon, S.J. was the 24th president of Creighton University from July 1, 2011, to January 20, 2015. He was previously the president of Saint Joseph's University.

== Biography ==
=== Early life ===
Timothy Ryan Lannon, S.J., is a native of Mason City, Iowa. His father, James Lannon, played football at Creighton University, where he earned a medical degree during the 1930s.

Lannon graduated from Newman Catholic High School in 1969. He graduated from Creighton in 1973 with a bachelor's degree in mathematics, and was president of the Student Board of Governors. While at Creighton, Lannon was also an active member in the Phi Kappa Psi fraternity. Lannon holds two master's degrees from Weston Jesuit School of Theology (now Boston College School of Theology and Ministry); a doctorate in administration, planning and social policy from the Graduate School of Education at Harvard University; and a professional diploma from Fordham University.

=== Career ===
Lannon entered the Jesuits in 1977. He was ordained a Catholic priest of the Society of Jesus in 1986.

Lannon began his professional career as an admissions counselor at Creighton and honed his educational and administrative skills as an instructor and assistant principal at Marquette University High School, an instructor at Boston College, and an assistant professor at Marquette University.

Lannon served as the President of Creighton Preparatory School, a Jesuit all-male high school in Omaha, from 1988 until 1995. He then joined Marquette University, where he served as the vice president for university advancement and associate executive vice president.

Lannon received Creighton University's College of Arts and Sciences Alumni Merit Award in 1993 and has been inducted into Creighton Prep's Hall of Fame. As an undergraduate, he received Creighton's highest student honor, the Spirit of Creighton Award, in 1973.

=== President of Saint Joseph's University (2003-2011) ===
Lannon was elected as president of Saint Joseph's University on December 6, 2002. He was chosen to succeed Rev. Nicholas S. Rashford, who has served as Saint Joseph's president for seventeen years. Lannon became the 26th President of Saint Joseph's University in Philadelphia, Pennsylvania during the summer of 2003.

Lannon spearheaded the acquisition of the 38-acre former Episcopal Academy in Lower Merion Township, Pennsylvania, which has been renamed the Maguire Campus in honor of James J. Maguire, a Saint Joseph's alumnus. Lannon also added new residence halls and a parking garage to Saint Joseph's main campus. The renovation of Alumni Memorial Fieldhouse, which will be called Michael J. Hagan arena when completed, was begun during his tenure.

SJU's historic comprehensive campaign With Faith and Strength to Dare: The Campaign for Saint Joseph's University, raised more than $152M exceeding its goal of $150M during Father Lannon's tenure.

In 2008, Father Lannon became the chairman of the Association of Jesuit Colleges and Universities. Additionally, Lannon serves on the boards of directors of Marquette University, Saint Joseph's Preparatory School in Philadelphia, the Greater Philadelphia Chamber of Commerce and the Association of Independent Colleges and Universities of Pennsylvania.

=== President of Creighton University (2011-2015) ===
Lannon became the 24th president of Creighton University, a Jesuit, Catholic university in Omaha, Nebraska, in July 2011. Lannon was the first alumnus of Creighton to be president.

During Father Lannon's short tenure, the university named its first school, the Heider College of Business due the largest gift in the university's history from Charlie and Mary Heider, achieved record enrollments, created the Provost model which resulted in a more unified and integrated educational experience, and forged a clinical partnership for the Health Sciences Schools and the College of Nursing with what is now called CHI Health. Lannon with others was instrumental in the university's affiliation with the Big East Athletic Conference in 2013.

In February 2014 Lannon announced his retirement as of June 2015. Creighton's Board of Trustees launched, in April 2014, a search for Lannon's successor and in December 2014, named Daniel S. Hendrickson, SJ, PhD as the prospective president.

Lannon retired, in January 2015 with J. Christopher Bradberry, Dean of the School of Pharmacy and Health Professions, named as interim president, until Fr. Hendrickson's arrival in July 2015.

=== Post-retirement Plans ===
Following retirement as president of Creighton University, Fr. Lannon took a sabbatical. He then was appointed in 2015 as the formation assistant of the USA Midwest Province of the Society of Jesus. In 2020, Fr. Lannon was appointed treasurer of the Midwest Jesuits in which he served for four years. In July 2024, Lannon became the superior of the Omaha Jesuit Community.
