= Felix-Joseph Barbelin =

Felix-Joseph Barbelin, (30 May 1808 – 9 June 1869) called the "Apostle of Philadelphia", was a 19th-century Jesuit priest influential in the development of the Catholic community in Philadelphia, Pennsylvania, in the United States.

== Life ==
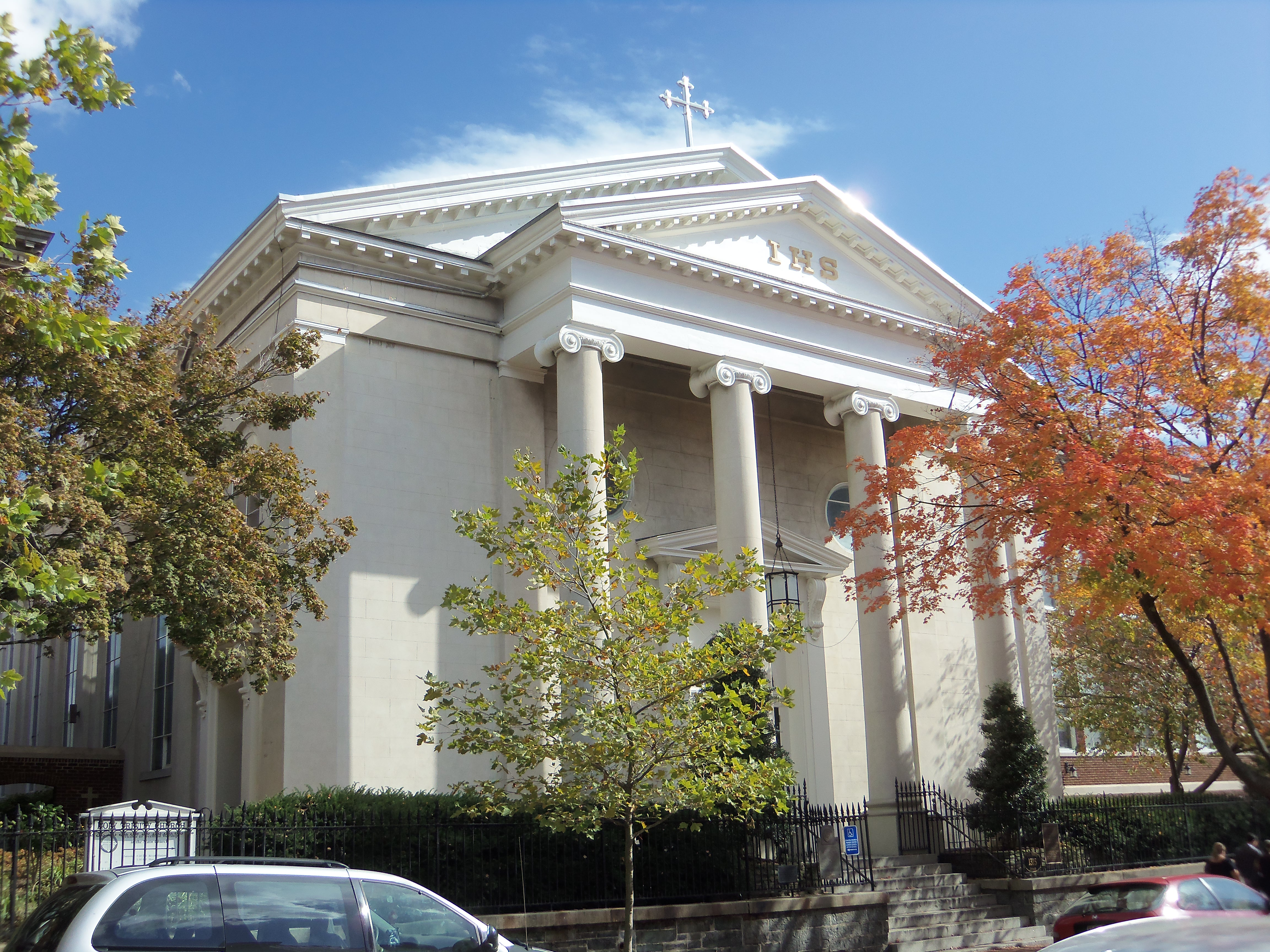
Holy Trinity Catholic Church in the Georgetown district of Washington, D.C., where Barbelin was assistant pastor from 1836 to 1838

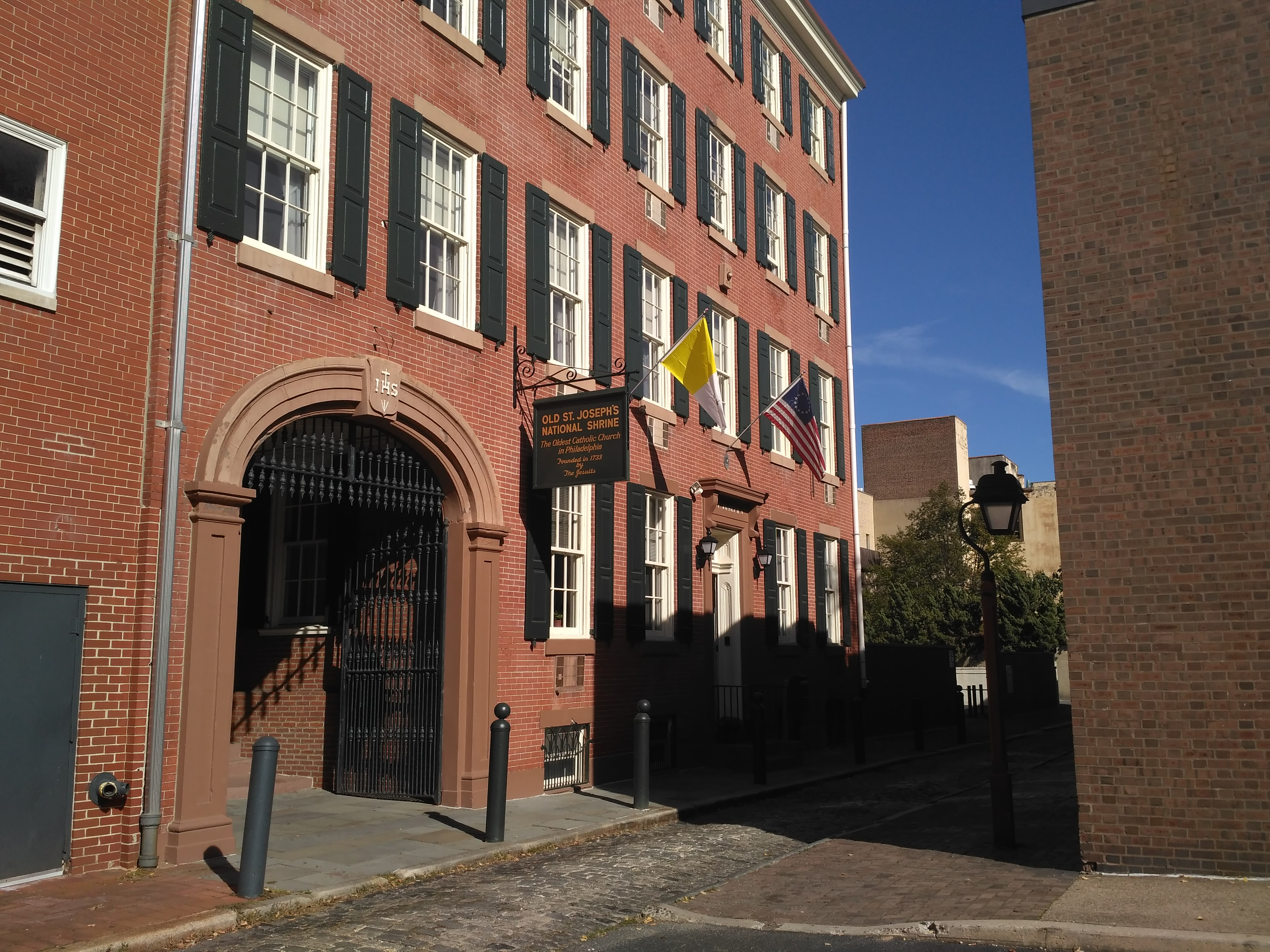
In 1838, Barbelin was named assistant pastor at Old St. Joseph's Church in Philadelphia

Barbelin was born at Lunéville, (then in the Province of Meurthe, now Meurthe-et-Moselle), in the Alsatian region of France, the oldest of seven children born to Dominic and Elizabeth Louis Barbelin. His father was the Secretary to the Revenue Department of the district of Luneville. All but one of his siblings chose to enter religious life. His youngest brother, Ignace-Xavier, also became a Jesuit.

Barbelin received his early training at the home of a reverend grand-uncle, and at the age of nineteen took up his philosophical and theological studies in a seminary in Nancy where another grand-uncle was president. He received minor orders in 1829 and was then Prefect of Studies at the minor seminary at Pont-à-Mousson.

He sailed from Le Havre on December 21, 1830, just before being conscripted, and landed in Norfolk, Virginia. From there he went to Georgetown, and entered the Society of Jesus on January 7,1831, at their novitiate at White Marsh Manor in Maryland. Subsequent to that, for some years he was stationed at Georgetown University, where he served as assistant prefect and professor of French. He was ordained in September 1835.

In 1836, he became assistant pastor of Holy Trinity Church in the Georgetown section of Washington, D.C. Given the tumultuous history of Irish factions in Philadelphia, in 1838, church authorities decided to send the Frenchman as assistant to St. Joseph's Church in Philadelphia. In the spring of 1844, anti-Catholic riots swept Philadelphia. Barbelin was advised to disguise himself and remove to a place of safety. Although St. Michael's and St. Augustine Church were burnt down, St. Joseph's was spared. When some rioters proposed to sack it, their leaders were heard to say, "Oh no, that little Frenchman won't hurt anybody". Philadelphians held a partiality towards the French because of the assistance they had provided during the Revolution. Barbelin was named pastor of St. Joseph's in August of that year.

For more than a quarter of a century he was pastor of St. Joseph's Church, Willing's Alley, which became, mainly during his term of office, the centre from which radiated Catholic influences throughout the city and diocese. He founded Saint Joseph's Hospital (closed 2015) in his adopted city, and was the first to establish sodalities for men and women and for the young. In 1852 he was appointed the first President of Saint Joseph's College, which is now known as Saint Joseph's University. Barbelin Hall at that university is named in his honor.

Around 1856, he and Thomas Lilly founded of the first Catholic school in Philadelphia to serve the educational needs of African American students. It later became St. Peter Claver School.

Barbelin died in Philadelphia on June 8, 1869.

Barbelin Hall at Old St. Joseph's was dedicated on March 18, 2005. It hosts the parishes "Faith, Food & Friends" outreach program, serving over 200 meals a week to the homeless and hungry poor. The hall has also been used to stage a production of Pope John Paul II's "The Jeweler’s Shop", put on by St. Joseph's eldership group.

Academic offices
New office	1st President of Saint Joseph's College; 1852—1856	Succeeded by James A. Ryder
Preceded by James A. Ward	4th President of Saint Joseph's College; 1860—1868	Succeeded by Burchard Villiger
