= Pennsylvania College of Health Sciences =

Private college in Lancaster, Pennsylvania, US

Coordinates: 40.0609254°N 76.2470571°W

- Type: private non-profit
- Active: 1903–2024
- Location: Lancaster, Pennsylvania, United States
- Website: www.pacollege.edu

Pennsylvania College of Health Sciences was a private healthcare-focused university in Lancaster, Pennsylvania. It offered associate, bachelor's, master's, and doctoral degree programs, as well as certificate programs. It enrolled more than 1,700 students at the time of its closure. On January 19, 2023, it was announced that Saint Joseph's University would acquire the campus of Pennsylvania College of Health Sciences, effectively merging the two institutions. This was completed on January 3, 2024.

== History ==
Founded in 1903, the Lancaster General Hospital School of Nursing was established to provide educational advancement for the hospital's nursing staff and to fulfill the needs of the local community with qualified healthcare providers. As Lancaster County, Pennsylvania grew, so did the school. More than 4,000 nurses had graduated from this program.

In 1952, Lancaster General Hospital (LGH) renewed its commitment to education and the community by developing Allied Health programs. The first major to be added was Medical Laboratory Science (now known as Clinical Laboratory Sciences). A program in Radiology Technology was added in 1960, followed by Surgical Technology.

As advances were made in healthcare, a need developed for more specialized healthcare practitioners. Since 1982, programs in Diagnostic Medical Sonography, Cardiovascular Invasive Specialty, and Nuclear Medicine have been added.

In 1994, the Lancaster General Hospital School of Nursing and allied health programs combined to form the Lancaster Institute for Health Education. The Pennsylvania Department of Education granted approval for private school licensure.

The Institute petitioned to the Pennsylvania Department of Education in 2001 and was granted approval to form the Lancaster General College of Nursing & Health Sciences. The parent organization of the College remains Lancaster General Health (now Penn Medicine Lancaster General Health). The College offers associate degrees, bachelor's degrees, master's degrees, and diploma and certificate programs.

As of 2006, Lancaster General College of Nursing & Health Sciences is accredited by the Middle States Commission on Higher Education. The College received approval from the Pennsylvania Department of Education in 2009 to offer baccalaureate education.

In August 2013, Lancaster General College of Nursing & Health Sciences changed their name to Pennsylvania College of Health Sciences, hoping to clarify the school's purpose. The school will continue its relationship with Penn Medicine Lancaster General Health and offer the same programs in healthcare management, training, and nursing.

In December 2014, the College's associate degree in nursing program was placed on provisional approval after too many graduates failed a licensing test on their first try. In September 2015, the College's pass rate was up to 84.08%.

The College announced in November 2015 that it will begin offering Pennsylvania's first three-year Bachelor of Science in Nursing program in Fall 2016.

In 2023, Saint Joseph's University announced it would acquire Pennsylvania College of Health Sciences. On January 3, 2024, Pennsylvania College of Health Sciences merged into Saint Joseph's University. All assets, records, and property of Pennsylvania College of Health Sciences has been acquired by Saint Joseph’s University.

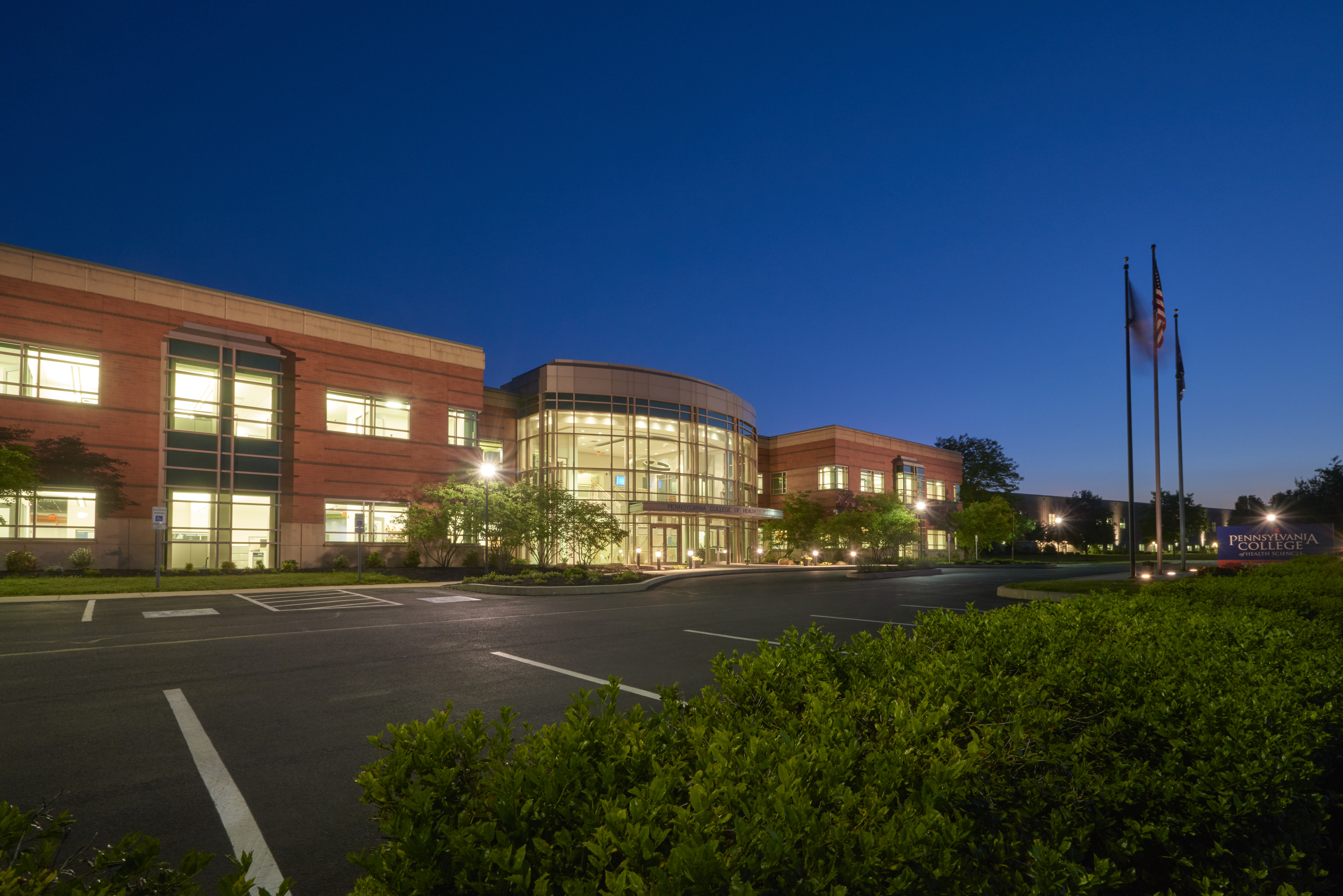
Pennsylvania College of Health Sciences is a private, accredited, four-year college focusing exclusively on the field of health care.

Lancaster General Hospital, the college's major clinical affiliate is part of the University of Pennsylvania Health System.

== Academics ==
The Pennsylvania College of Health Sciences offers the following academic degrees:

- Bachelor of Science
- Bachelor of Science in Nursing
- Master of Healthcare Administration
- Master of Science in Nursing
- Doctor of Nursing Practice
