= Barbelin Hall =

- Barbelin Hall
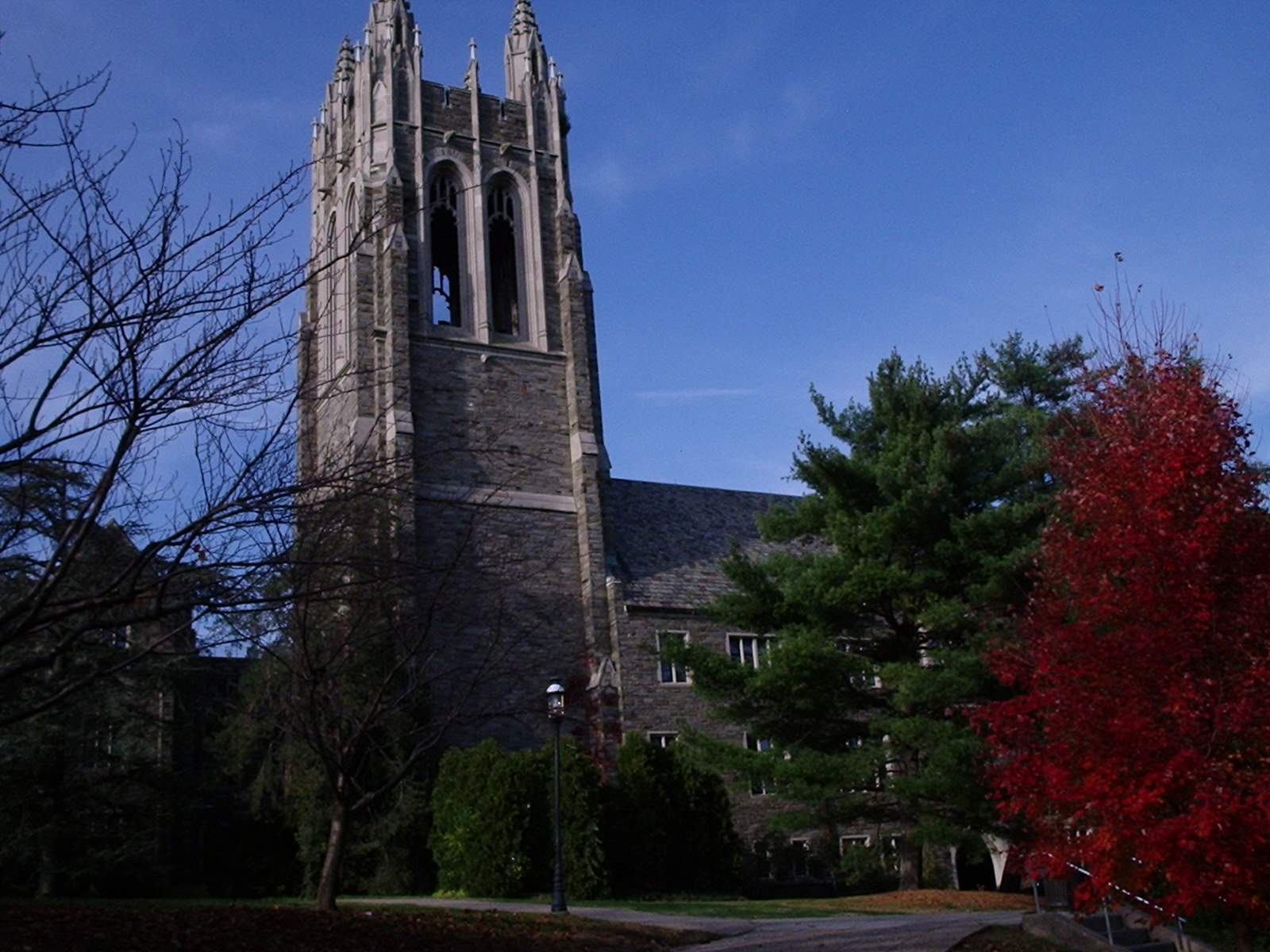
- Barbelin Tower

General information
- Type: Collegiate building
- Architectural style: Gothic revival
- Location: 5600 City Avenue Philadelphia, PA 19131
- Completed: 1927
- Owner: Saint Joseph's University

Height
- Height: 165 feet

Design and construction
- Architect: F. Ferdinand Durang
- Main contractor: John McShain

Barbelin Hall is the most enduring and memorable building on the campus of Saint Joseph's University in Philadelphia, Pennsylvania. The structure was completed in 1927 and was the first building on the current City Avenue campus known as Hawk Hill. The building is known for its 165-foot tower which has become a symbol of the university. It is often used as a secondary logo for SJU.

The building is named for Felix-Joseph Barbelin who served two separate terms as president of what was then known as Saint Joseph's College. Constructed of Wissahickon schist (a local stone) and limestone, the facade features gargoyles, heads of early presidents of the college, and an array of other limestone carvings. The building was first used for all types of classes and as a residence hall. It is now exclusively used for the College of Arts & Sciences at Saint Joseph's. What is known as Barbelin Quad is located in the middle of the building. The tower overlooks the entire campus including Sweeney Field and the Haub School of Business in Mandeville Hall.

A number of gargoyles can be seen on the building while on Barbelin Quad. Statues and grotesques of heads of former presidents of Saint Joseph's are also located on the edges of the building. In front of Barbelin, overlooking City Avenue, is a statue of sju
