= Saint Joseph's University =

Private university in Philadelphia, Pennsylvania, US

- Former name: Saint Joseph's College (1851-1978)
- Motto: "Spirit, Intellect, Purpose"
- Type: Private university
- Established: September 15, 1851; 175 years ago
- Accreditation: MSCHE
- Religious affiliation: Catholic (Jesuit)
- Academic affiliations: AJCU; ACCU; NAICU
- Endowment: $484.2 million (2025)
- President: Cheryl McConnell
- Faculty: 449
- Students: 7,159 (fall 2024)
- Undergraduates: 5,044 (fall 2024)
- Postgraduates: 2,115 (fall 2024)
- Location: Philadelphia-Lower Merion Township, Pennsylvania, United States; 39°59′43″N 75°14′20″W
- Campus: 149 acres (60.3 ha); Large city
- Other campuses: Lancaster
- Newspaper: The Hawk
- Colors: Crimson and gray
- Nickname: Hawks
- Sporting affiliations: NCAA Division I - A-10; Philadelphia Big 5; City 6
- Mascot: The Hawk
- Website: www.sju.edu

Saint Joseph's University (SJU or St. Joe's) is a private Jesuit university in Philadelphia and Lower Merion Township, Pennsylvania, United States. The university was founded by the Society of Jesus in 1851 as Saint Joseph's College, named after Saint Joseph. It is the seventh oldest Jesuit university in the United States and the sixth largest university in Philadelphia. The university has an additional campus in Lancaster, Pennsylvania.

Saint Joseph's University has nearly 9,000 undergraduate, graduate, and doctoral students in over 162 undergraduate programs, 84 graduate programs, and 9 degree-completion and post-baccalaureate programs. It has 14 centers and institutes, including the Kinney Center for Autism Education and Support and the Pedro Arrupe, S.J., Center for Business Ethics. Saint Joseph's University is classified as an R2: Doctoral University with High Research Activity by the Carnegie Classification of Institutions of Higher Education.

== History ==
=== Establishment ===
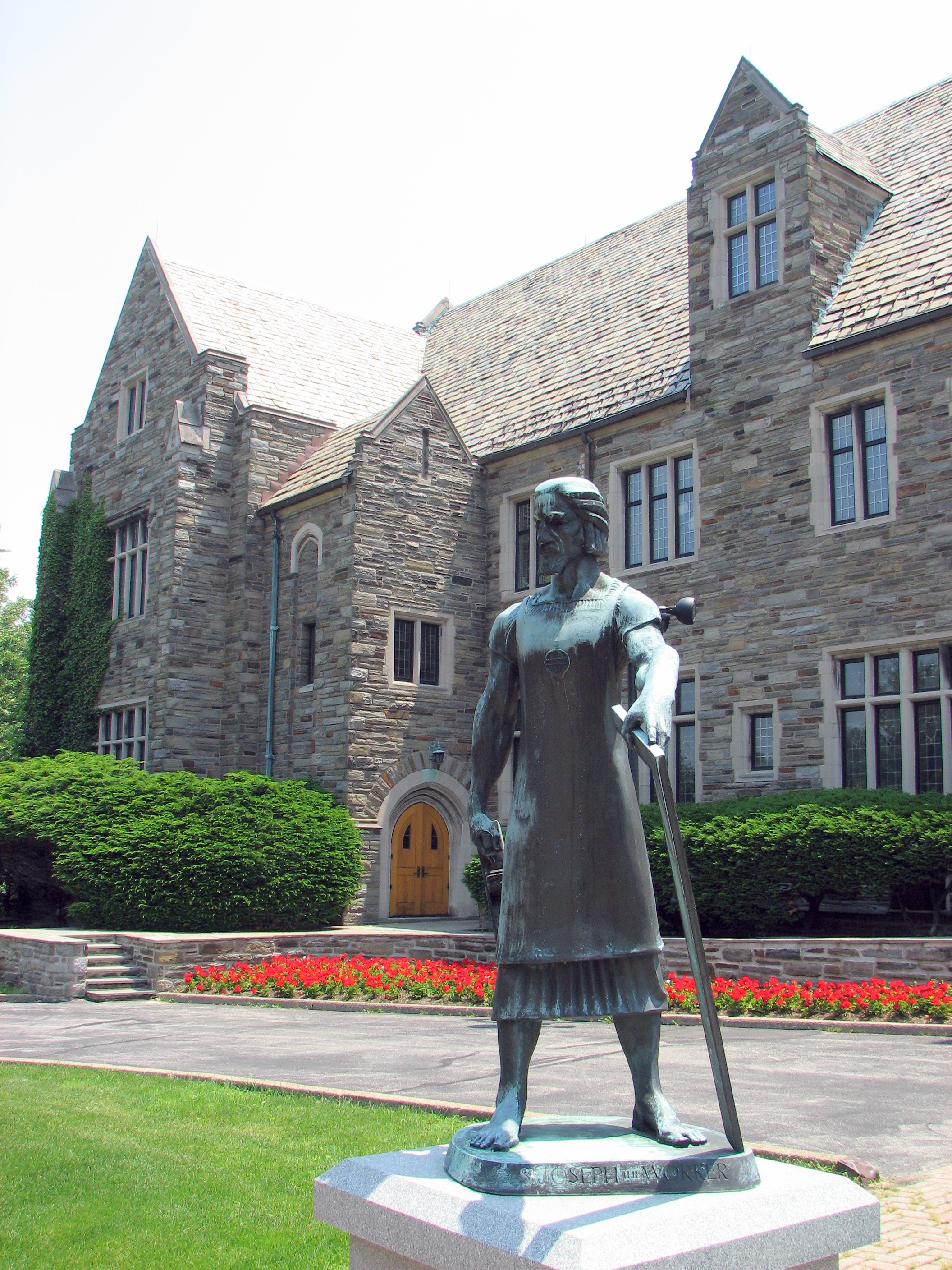
A Statue of Saint Joseph located on the Hawk Hill Campus outside Barbelin Hall

Saint Joseph's University was founded by the Jesuits in 1851 as Saint Joseph's College. The university is the seventh oldest Jesuit university in the United States. St. Joseph's College started on September 15, 1851, when 36 students began classes in a building adjacent to Old St. Joseph's Church on Willings Alley, between South 3rd and South 4th Streets and Walnut and Spruce Streets in Philadelphia.

St. Joseph's College moved in 1866 from Willings Alley to a full block on Girard Avenue between 17th and 18th Streets in Philadelphia (now the location of Saint Joseph's Preparatory School).

St. Joseph's College moved to its present City Avenue campus in November 1927. After raising over $1 million, Saint Joseph's College purchased twenty-three acres of land along City Avenue and began construction on Barbelin Hall, the first academic building on campus. In 1978, Saint Joseph's College became Saint Joseph's University after being recognized as a university by the Secretary of Education of the Commonwealth of Pennsylvania.

=== Recent mergers ===
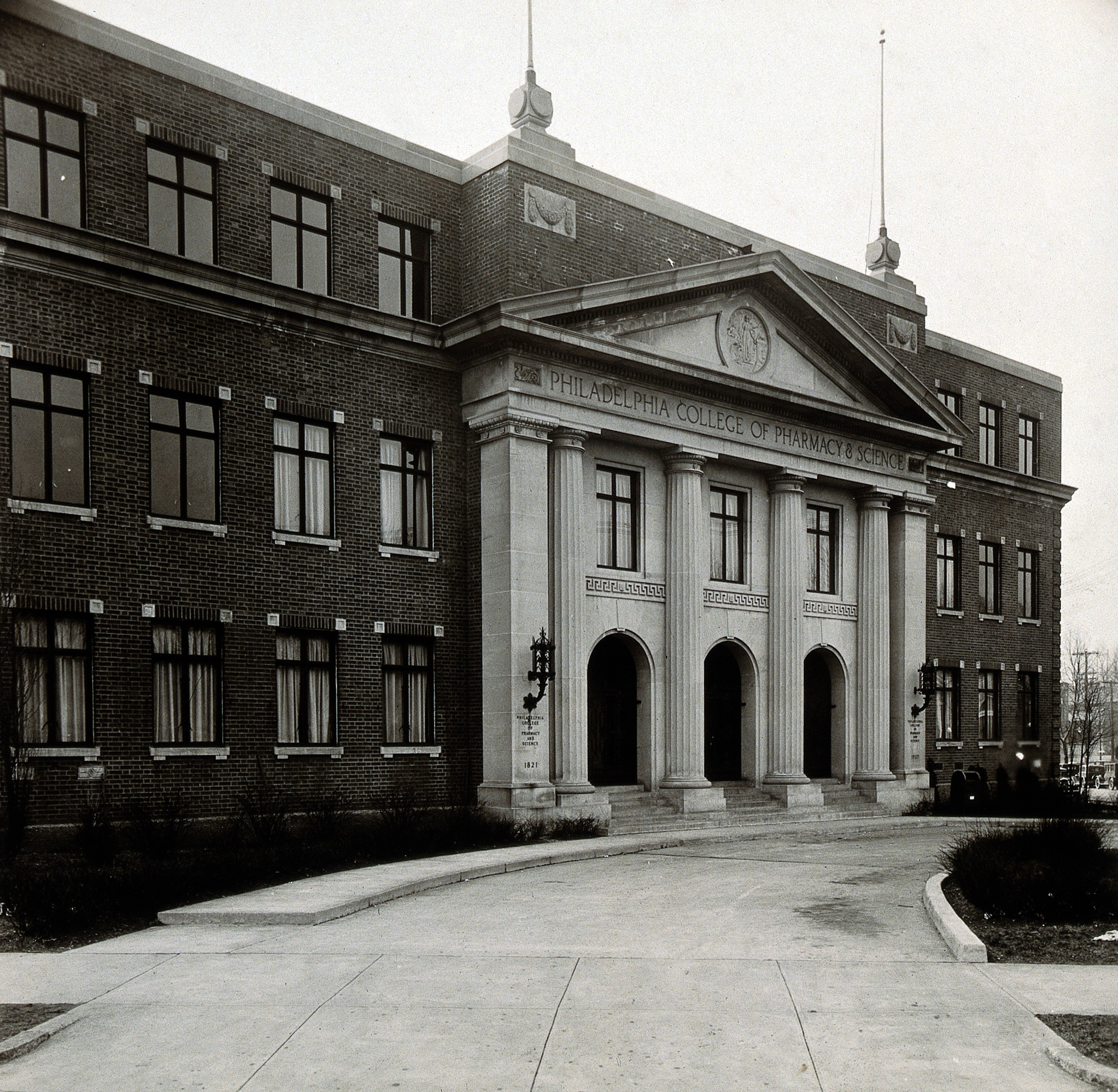
Entrance to the Philadelphia College of Pharmacy

In February 1821, 68 apothecaries met at Carpenters' Hall to establish improved scientific standards and develop better training programs. Classes began nearly immediately, making the Philadelphia College of Pharmacy the first institution of higher learning in the United States dedicated to the field of pharmacy.

In 1825, the college began publishing the first academic journal in the United States dedicated to pharmacy. The apothecaries formalized their new association through a constitution, which declared their intent to establish a school of pharmacy to enhance their vocation and to "guard the drug market from the introduction of spurious, adulterated, deteriorated or otherwise mischievous articles, which are too frequently forced into it".

On June 1, 2022, Saint Joseph's University acquired University of the Sciences, which included the Philadelphia College of Pharmacy. This acquisition added professional programs in health and science, including occupational therapy, physical therapy, physician assistant, and pharmacy to Saint Joseph's University. This merger

Saint Joseph's University merged with the Pennsylvania College of Health Sciences in January 2024, making it the university's third campus.

=== University leadership ===
Upon Saint Joseph's College being founded in 1851, Fr. Felix-Joseph Barbelin served as the first president of the university. The subsequent 26 presidents were also priests in the Catholic Church.

On April 22, 2015, Mark C. Reed was appointed to serve as the 28th president of Saint Joseph's University, being the first layperson to hold the role of President since the founding of the university. He served as president of Saint Joseph's University from 2015 until 2022, when he resigned to serve as president of Loyola University Chicago.

On March 10, 2023, Saint Joseph's University's board of trustees elected Cheryl A. McConnell its 29th – and first female – president in the university's 172-year history. She had most recently served as Saint Joseph's interim president, as provost, and as chief academic officer for three years prior.

=== Crest ===
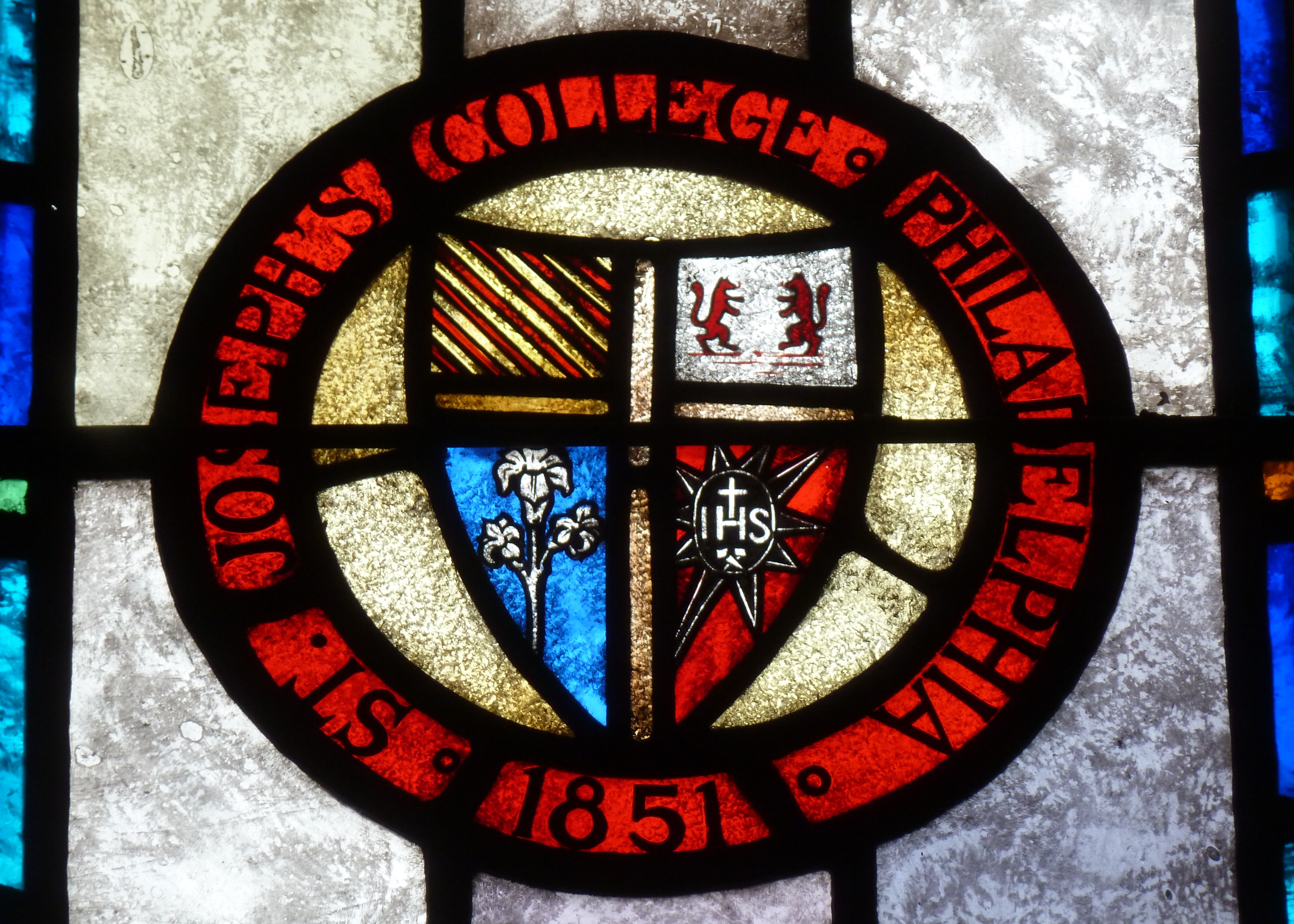
The seal of Saint Joseph's College in the Burns Library at Boston College

The crest of Saint Joseph's University is a graphical representation of the university's Jesuit background. The logo represents important moments in the history of the Loyola family, particularly St. Ignatius of Loyola, one of the founders of the Society of Jesus.

In relation to the elements of the crest, four sections are present. In the top left section of the crest, seven gold bars on a maroon field are representative of the Loyola family, particularly, the seven sons of Loyola. In the top right section of the crest, two wolves are shown standing over a kettle pot. This section represents the reported generosity of the Loyola family towards both their soldiers and the poor. Tradition claims that the Loyola family provided so much food for their soldiers that even the wolves had enough to eat.

In the bottom right section of the crest, the letters "IHS" are visible. These are the first three letters of the name of Jesus in Greek, and the historic monogram of the Society of Jesus. In the bottom left section, a lily is visible. In Catholicism, the lily is associated with Saint Joseph, the school's patron saint. The seal is the graphical representation of Saint Joseph's and its Jesuit identity.

== Jesuit and Catholic identity ==
The university's Jesuit identity is extensively used in its branding. It began the Magis ("greater") campaign in 2013 to highlight commitment to living "For the greater glory of God" (Ad maiorem Dei gloriam), the motto of the Society of Jesus.

SJU also promotes the Jesuit principle of cura personalis or "care for the whole person." Undergraduates must complete a general education program that focuses heavily on traditional liberal arts disciplines.

The university's Jesuit community live in one of two locations on the Hawk Hill campus. The Loyola Center, located on City Avenue, is connected to Manresa Hall, the infirmary for Jesuits. The Loyola Center exclusively houses retired members of the Jesuit Community. The second location, Arrupe Hall, serves as housing for active Jesuits at Saint Joseph's University, and features a large dining hall and chapel.

On September 27, 2015, Pope Francis, himself a long-time member of the Jesuit Order, made a stop at the university during his two-day visit to Philadelphia.

== Academics ==
Academic rankings

Master's
- Washington Monthly: 89

Regional
- U.S. News & World Report: 8

National
- Forbes: 272
- WSJ/College Pulse: 42

The university has five schools and colleges that offer 250 academic programs and 9 degree-completion and post-baccalaureate certificate programs. Of tenure-track faculty, 100% hold the highest possible degrees in their fields. As of 2025, the six-year undergraduate graduation rate was 83% and the first-year student retention rate was 89%. The Carnegie Classification of Institutions of Higher Education classified Saint Joseph's among "Master's Colleges and Universities (larger programs)".

The university has 14 centers and institutes, which include the Academy of Food Marketing, The Barnes Arboretum at Saint Joseph's University, Center for Addiction and Recovery Education, Center for Professional Development, Faith-Justice Institute, Institute for Environmental Stewardship, Institute for Jewish-Catholic Relations, Institute of Clinical Bioethics, Kinney Center for Autism Education and Support, Maguire Academy of Insurance and Risk Management, Pedro Arrupe, S.J., Center for Business Ethics, Philadelphia Regional Institute for STEM Educators and Substance Use Disorders Institute.

=== Admissions ===
The overall first-year acceptance rate is 83%. The average freshman retention rate is 89%. Of the undergraduate class of 2024, 98% were either employed, pursuing graduate studies, or involved in full-time volunteer programs within six months of graduation.

Saint Joseph's University is test-optional. Applicants are not required to submit SAT or ACT test scores, although they may choose to.

== Campus ==
=== Main campus ===
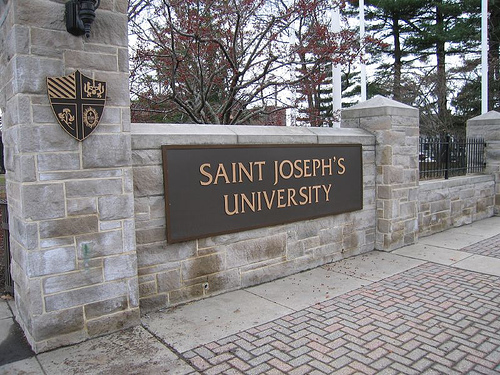
A sign for Saint Joseph's University located along City Avenue

Saint Joseph's University's main campus, often referred to as Hawk Hill, is located along City Avenue, which splits the university between the western edge of Philadelphia and Lower Merion Township. The university owns property on both the Philadelphia and Lower Merion sides of City Avenue. Hawk Hill is the original location of the university when it moved to City Avenue in 1927. Saint Joseph's most well-known building is Barbelin Hall, which opened in 1927. The hall is known for its Gothic architecture, particularly the gargoyles that mark what is called the Barbelin Quadrangle (or Barbelin Courtyard) and the tall, four-spired bell tower that can be seen from miles away. The bell tower that sits atop Barbelin served as the university's logo for several years. Barbelin Hall was built by John McShain, who constructed The Pentagon and the Jefferson Memorial.

The university's official mailing address is in Philadelphia. The two sides of the main campus are connected by both bridge and underpass allowing access across City Avenue. Its 125 acres (0.51 km^{2}) are concentrated from Cardinal Avenue to 52nd Street and Overbrook Avenue to City Avenue. With the acquisition of the Maguire Campus, one half of the 125 acres (0.51 km^{2}) are located on the Lower Merion side of City Avenue. In all, there are 99 buildings on the university's campus.

The Hawk Hill campus features Barbelin Hall, Mandeville Hall, Bellarmine Hall, Post Hall, and the Science Center as the main academic halls. Green spaces on campus include St. Mary's, Claver House, and Wolfington lawns located on the Main Campus, in addition to two quadrangles, College Hall Quad and Barbelin Quad.

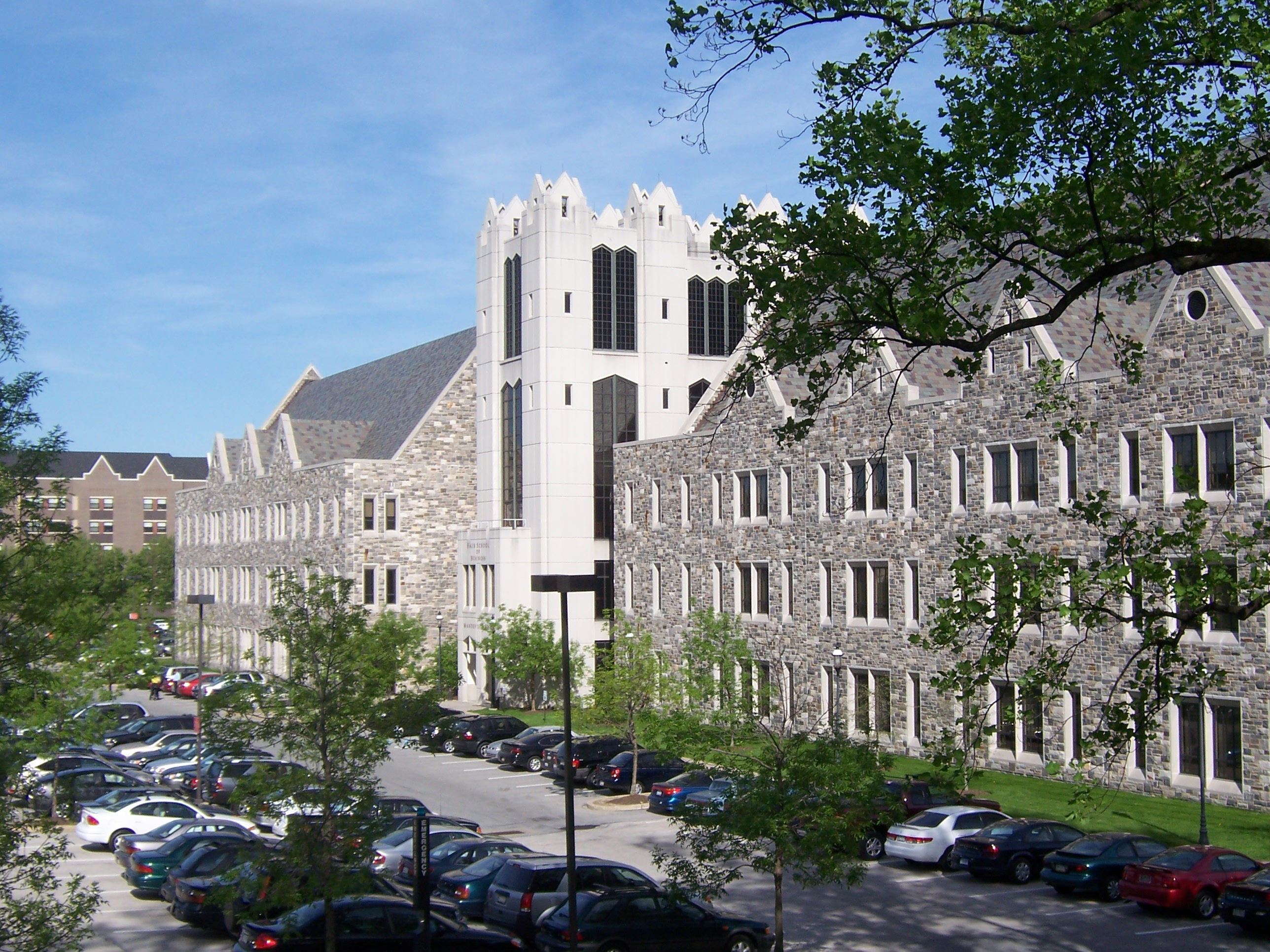
Mandeville Hall on Hawk Hill

The Post Learning Commons is the university's main library, the result of a renovation of the original Francis A. Drexel Library and an expansion project called the Post Learning Commons, from 2011 to 2013. Drexel Library and Post Learning Commons are connected via a glass atrium and bridge through the heart of campus. The Post Learning Commons houses approximately 355,000 volumes, 1,450 print journals, 15,000 full-text electronic journals, 2,800 e-books, 866,000 microforms, and 4,975 audio-visual materials. Unique to the Post Learning Commons is the Campbell Collection in Food Marketing.

In September 2012, the university purchased the adjacent Cardinal's Residence on 54th and Cardinal Avenue from the Archdiocese of Philadelphia. Beginning with the fall 2014 semester, the Cardinal's Residence was renamed the Maguire Wolfington Welcome Center. It serves as a welcome center for prospective families and has offices for all enrollment management operations.

Campion Student Center is the hub for student activities, student life administrative offices, and dining facilities. The student center within Campion also features the Doyle Banquet Halls, Forum Theater, and President's Lounge used for larger gatherings and lectures on campus. Located just off Campion Student Center is Simpson Hall, which houses the Student Media Center and The Perch, a 24-hour student lounge. In 2023, the dining facilities were renovated, with the new dining facility being named "The Kettle". The Kettle utilizes the concept of ghost kitchens and mobile ordering. The Kettle also offers a separate large dining area with buffet-style food.

Saint Joseph's University also owns multiple buildings in Overbrook, located about a mile from the center of Hawk Hill near the Overbrook Train Station. Currently the Overbrook campus holds four dorms, reserved exclusively for sophomores. These dorms are the Ashwood Apartments, Merion Gardens Apartments, Morris Townhouses, and Moore Hall.

St. Joe's is within 15 miles (24 km) of La Salle University, Harcum College, Rosemont College, Philadelphia College of Osteopathic Medicine, University of Pennsylvania, Drexel University, Temple University, Swarthmore College, Bryn Mawr College, Haverford College, Philadelphia University, Eastern University, and Villanova University. SEPTA regional rail train stations on each side of campus provide students with easy access to Center City.

First-year students on Hawk Hill can choose from traditional residence halls (McShain Hall, Villiger Hall, or Sr. Thea Bowman Hall) or a suite-style residence hall (Sourin Residence Center). Sophomores can choose to live in several campus houses or apartments. In May 2022, the university announced the largest fundraising campaign in the university's history, which sought to raise $300 million to improve the campus, financial aid offers, and academic programs. As part of the campus plan, construction began on a new residence hall in fall 2023, which the university named after Sister Thea Bowman. Additional on-campus construction and developments are listed on the university's Campus Master Plan.

=== Maguire campus ===
On August 8, 2008, Saint Joseph's completed the acquisition of the adjacent Episcopal Academy after purchasing the property in 2005. The new 38-acre area (150,000 m^{2}) was named the Maguire Campus for the lead donor, Saint Joseph's alumnus James Maguire. The Maguire Campus is located directly across from the Main Campus on the Lower Merion side of City Avenue. While this land is referred to as the "Maguire Campus", the property is considered part of the main "Hawk Hill" campus in contrast to the University City or Lancaster campuses. The Maguire Campus features three main academic buildings: Merion Hall, Connelly Hall, and Toland Hall. Merion Hall is the largest of the three.

The Cardinal John Foley Center, a multi-use space, hosts lectures, concerts, and social gatherings, in addition to large-scale admission events. The Kinney Center for Autism Education and Support, established in 2009, was made possible with donations totaling over $8 million, and is located in Connelly Hall. Duperreault, Quinn, and Windrim Halls are campus houses serving as administrative space for University Advancement.

In 2018, Saint Joseph's University announced that it had entered into an educational collaboration with The Barnes Foundation. The Arboretum of the Barnes Foundation, located adjacent to the Maguire Campus, would have facilities and operations handled by Saint Joseph's University, while the Barnes Foundation would continue to oversee historic buildings and the Arboretum. In May 2023, the university opened the Maguire Art Museum within the Arboretum after renovating many aspects of the building. The museum collaboration has been attributed by the university to a historic $50m gift made in 2017 by alumnus James Maguire ('58).

=== Lancaster campus ===
The Lancaster Campus was acquired in 2024 as a result of the merger between Saint Joseph's University and the Pennsylvania College of Health Sciences. The Lancaster Campus is the only campus at Saint Joseph's University that does not offer on-campus housing.

=== University City campus ===
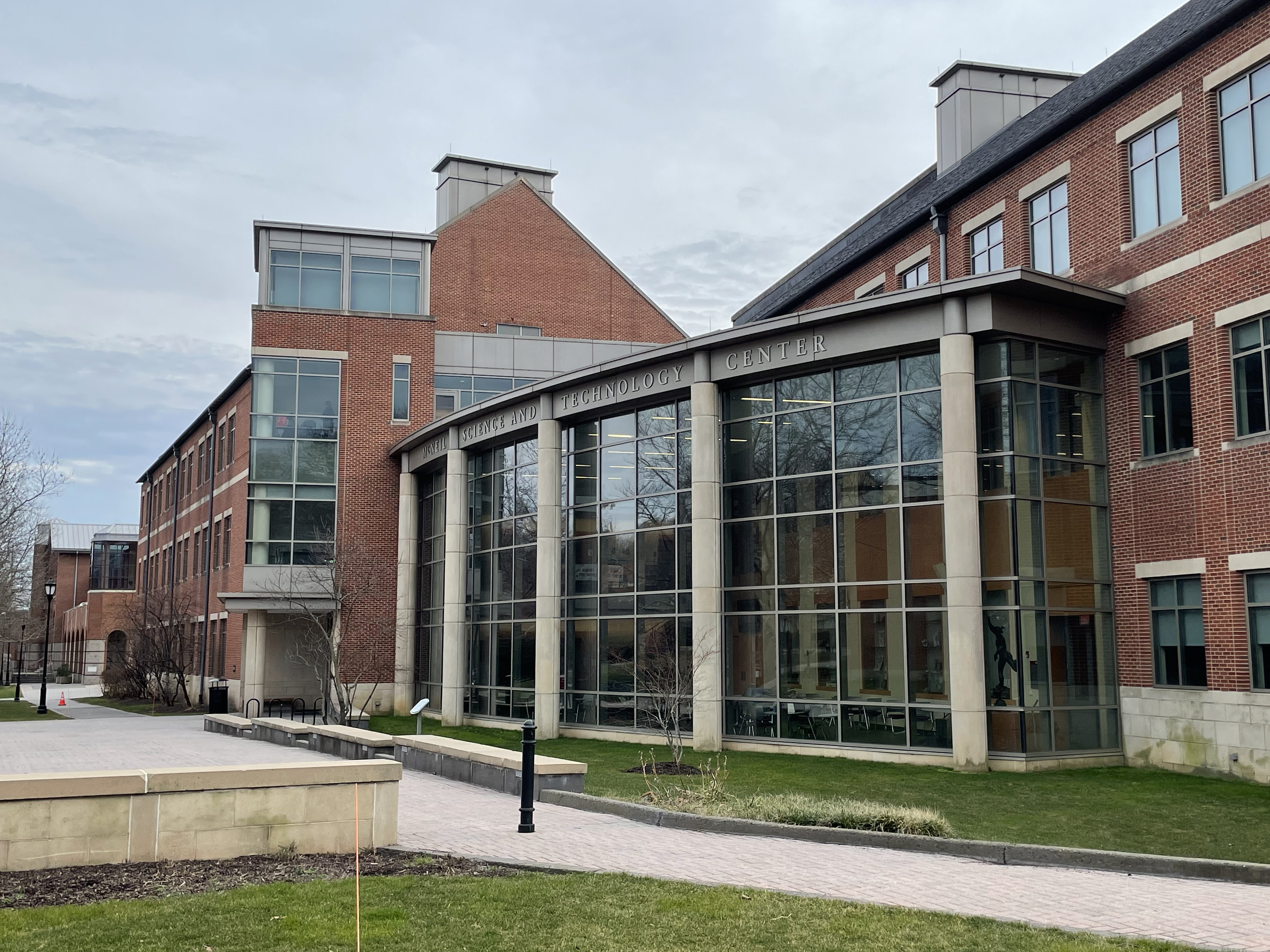
McNeil Science And Technology Center at the University City campus

On June 1, 2022, as a result of the merger with University of the Sciences, Saint Joseph's acquired a second major campus. At the time of the merger, the University City campus covered approximately 24 acres of urban landscape in the section of West Philadelphia known as University City, which also encompasses the University of Pennsylvania and Drexel University.

In January 2025, The Philadelphia Inquirer reported that Saint Joseph's University planned to sell the entire University City campus and use the funds to construct additional buildings on the Hawk Hill campus.

In September 2025, the Inquirer reported that Saint Joseph's University had reached an agreement with the Belmont Neighborhood Educational Alliance, an educational organization operating schools within Philadelphia. The agreement stated that Saint Joe's would sell all buildings on the UCity Campus owned by the university below Woodland Avenue, with plans to lease three buildings back post-sale for University usage.

== Student life ==
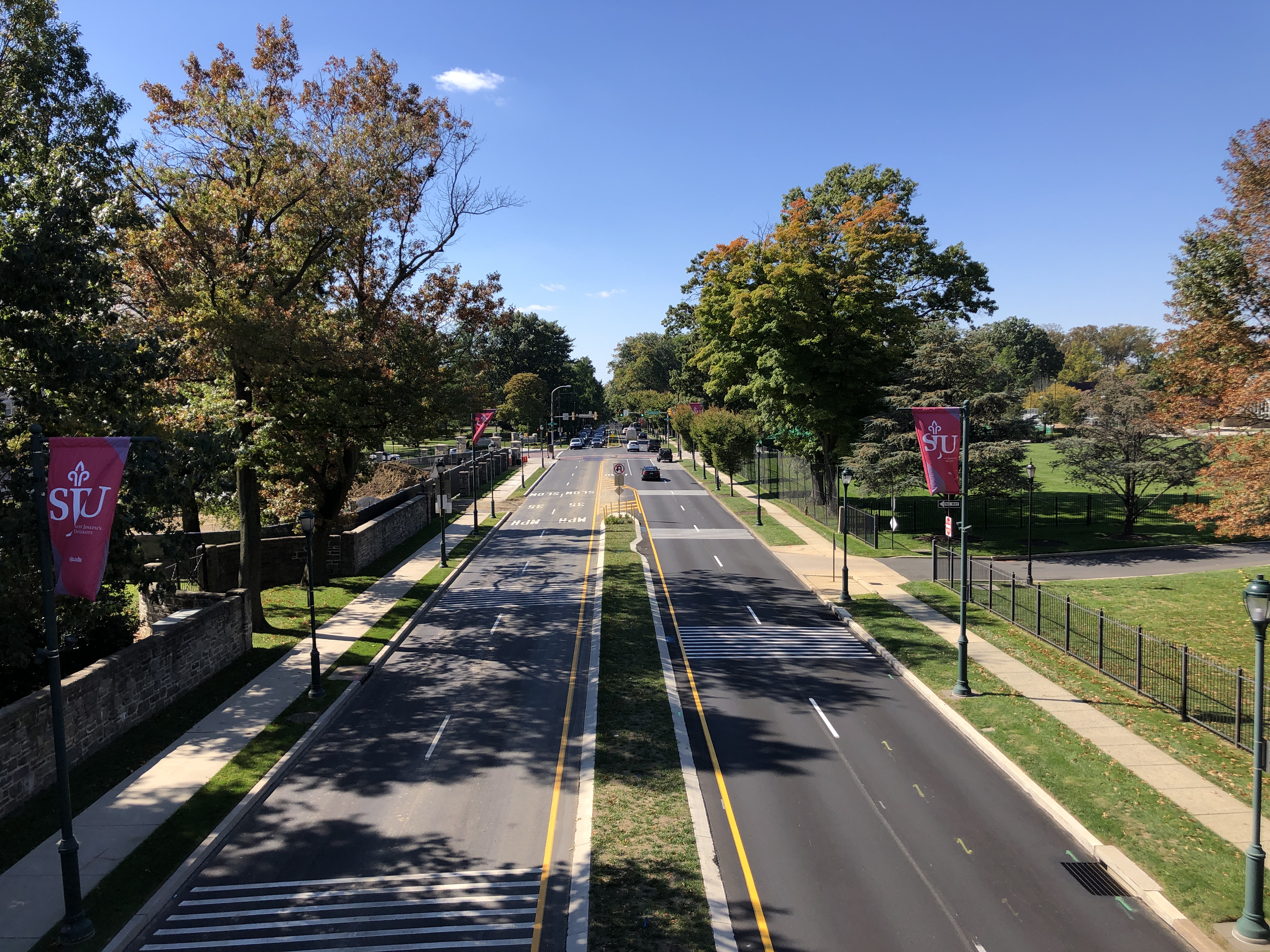
Saint Joseph's University campus along City Avenue

As of fall 2023, Saint Joseph's University enrolled 7,861 students. Students come from all over the United States, but most come from the Northeast, including Pennsylvania. Of these students 5,036 are traditional undergraduates, while the university's graduate and professional student population is numbered at 2,373.

Student body composition as of May 2, 2022
Race and ethnicity	Total
White	67%
Asian	11%
Hispanic	9%
Black	6%
Other (Note: Other consists of Multiracial Americans & those who prefer to not say.)	3%
Foreign national	2%
Economic diversity
Low-income (Note: The percentage of students who received an income-based federal Pell grant intended for low-income students.)	18%
Affluent (Note: The percentage of students who are a part of the American middle class at the bare minimum.)	82%

The student body is 55% female and 45% male. The retention rate for Saint Joseph's is high, with about 89% of students returning for their sophomore year. As of 2025, the undergraduate graduation rate for the past six years was 83%. The student-faculty ratio is 10:1 for undergraduate programs and 7:1 for graduate programs, with an average class size of 25.

=== Community service organizations ===
Saint Joseph's University has an active Campus Ministry. The group is inspired by Catholic and Jesuit traditions, but is open to students of any faith. Students in campus ministry are able to take part in retreats, offered each semester, and programs or events hosted in the Chapel of Saint Joseph throughout the spring and fall semesters.

The Kinney Center for Autism Education and Support at Saint Joseph's University hires students to serve as peer mentors for the ASPIRE Program, a program designed to support students with autism during the transition to college. Kinney Scholars are able to work with neurodivergent individuals and provide peer mentoring and resources to help individuals with autism during their college transition.

=== Student media ===
The Hawk, the university's student newspaper, was founded in 1930. Articles are published weekly during the fall and spring semesters.

The Crimson and Gray Literary Magazine showcases student fiction, poetry, and artwork. The Crimson and Gray Literary Magazine was first founded in 2002, but was forced to take a two-year hiatus over 2020 and 2021 as a result of the COVID-19 pandemic. Students review submissions and publish the magazine, with two students serving as co-editors.

Radio 1851 is Saint Joseph's University's student-run radio station. It plays a variety of genres, including indie rock, rap/hip-hop, country, and electric dance music. The station began in 1922 as WSJR, the first college radio station to broadcast on AM, and moved to FM in the 80s.

=== Greek life ===
Saint Joseph's University recognizes fourteen social Greek organizations and six co-educational, professional Greek organizations. Approximately 22% of undergraduates are affiliated with a social fraternity or sorority. No Greek housing is provided by the university.

=== Club sports ===
Saint Joseph's University recognizes 30 clubs, intramural sports, and fitness programs. It competes in the Philadelphia City 6 Extramural Classics. The women's ice hockey team is a club sport at Saint Joe's, but is recognized by the Delaware Valley College Hockey Conference (DVCHC) as a Division III sport.

== Athletics ==
Saint Joseph's University is the home of the Hawks, the university athletics program. The school colors are crimson and gray. SJU fields teams in 21 varsity sports in Division I of the National Collegiate Athletic Association. The Hawks are part of the Atlantic 10 Conference. Since the Atlantic 10 does not support men's lacrosse, the Hawks play in the Northeast Conference for that sport only.

Along with the Atlantic 10, Saint Joseph's is a member of the Philadelphia Big 5. The other member schools of the Philadelphia Big 5 are Temple University, Villanova University, the University of Pennsylvania, Drexel University, and inter-conference rival LaSalle University.

=== Men's basketball ===
While Saint Joseph's fields 20 NCAA sports, the university's most popular sport is men's basketball. Saint Joseph's has a rich basketball tradition. Most home games are played at Hagan Arena on the school's campus, while some games are played at the Palestra on the University of Pennsylvania campus.

Saint Joseph's major rival is Villanova University. The rivalry is known as the Holy War, although starting in 2013 both schools requested that the media refrain from using the term. The school also maintains rivalries with the other Philadelphia universities.

Fans of the Hawks often chant "The Hawk Will Never Die!" Since the school's undefeated regular season, this chant has gained familiarity with the team's opponents. In 2003, Sports Illustrated listed the cheer among "The 100 Things You Gotta Do Before You Graduate (Whatever the Cost)", calling it "the most defiant cheer in college sports."

=== The Hawk Mascot ===
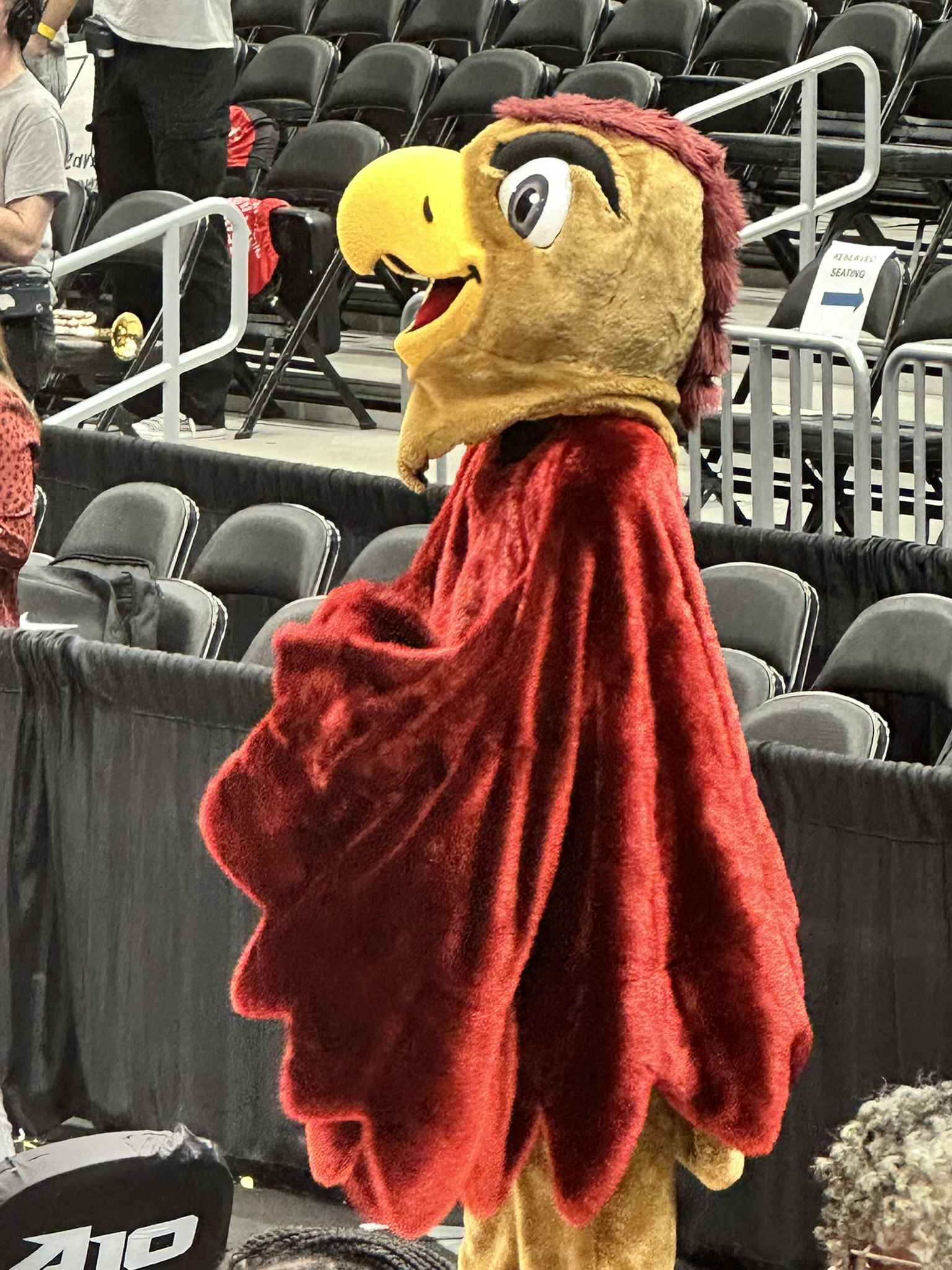
The Hawk

Saint Joseph's Mascot, 'The Hawk', has been flapping its wings for over 50 years. Jim Brennan originated the idea for a hawk as mascot during the 1954–1955 season. Brennan, a former Marine and SJU cheerleader, at first wanted to secure an actual hawk, but later switched to the costume idea. The student government raised the $120 needed to buy the initial costume, which Brennan donned for three years. He made his debut as the Hawk on January 4, 1956, at a 69–56 win over La Salle University at the Palestra.

The Hawk is best known for staying in constant motion by flapping its wings throughout every basketball game, and for representing the Saint Joseph's motto, "The Hawk Will Never Die". It is also recognized by its "flying" in figure eights around the court during timeouts.

=== Athletic facilities ===
- John W. Smithson '68 Field: The Hawks' on-campus baseball field opened in 2012 on the Maguire Campus. It features a synthetic surface with a dirt pitching mound and an AstroTurf 3D GameDay Grass surface. Bleacher seating capacity is 400 with much more space for standing room only.
- SJU Softball Field: The softball team opened their on-campus field in 2012. It features a turf outfield and bleacher seating for 400 spectators.
- Robert M. Gillin Jr., Boathouse: Located along the Schuylkyll River, Saint Joseph's University's rowing programs are based at this boathouse. The boathouse is located in 'Boathouse Row'. The boathouse provides a permanent home for the Hawk rowing programs. In addition, it provides the university with a significant presence on Kelly Drive. Named in honor of Robert Gillin Jr., groundbreaking for the facility took place in the fall of 2001.
- Sweeney Field: Laid out in a natural bowl in the center of Saint Joseph's campus, Sweeney Field (formerly known as Finnesey Field) is the home field of Hawk soccer, lacrosse, and field hockey teams. Originally constructed for football and opened in 1929 with plans for an eventual 70,000-seat stadium, the field has undergone numerous changes over the years.
- SJU Tennis Complex: The university offers six tennis courts on the Maguire Campus along with four courts on the Main Campus, located alongside Sweeney Field.
- Michael J. Hagan Arena: The on-campus home of the Hawks basketball teams was originally named Alumni Memorial Fieldhouse for the Saint Joseph's graduates who gave their lives in World War II. The building was officially dedicated on November 11, 1949, and two weeks later played host to its first basketball game, a 62–46 loss to Rhode Island on November 26. Following that initial setback, SJU would go on to win the next 23 games in the friendly confines of the Fieldhouse. Overall, the Hawks have compiled an impressive 305–76 record (80.0 winning percentage) on Hawk Hill. Among the highlights of the Hawks' home court advantage was a 34-game winning streak from the late 1950s to the early 1960s, an 11–0 record in 2000–01, and the unbeaten 11–0 mark as the Hawks made their perfect season run in 2003–04. All told, SJU has had only two losing records in the Fieldhouse over 57 seasons. The Fieldhouse held 3,200 fans but the arena has a capacity of 4,200. Martin Luther King Jr., spoke at the Fieldhouse in the 1960s.
- Ellen Ryan Field: The field hockey team returned to campus after a multi-year hiatus with the addition of Ellen Ryan Field on the Maguire Campus in 2011. Ryan Field has a synthetic AstroTurf12 pitch and is situated adjacent to City Avenue.
- Athletic/Recreation Center (ARC): Located on the University City Campus, the ARC serves as the main athletic facility for students at the UCity campus. Featuring 78,000 square feet of space, the facility includes an indoor track, basketball court, gym equipment, and multiple rooms in which events are able to be hosted.

The university also has a four-court multi-purpose area for basketball, tennis, and volleyball, an indoor four-lane 200-yard (180 m) jogging track, an esports lab on the Hawk Hill campus, four racquetball courts, locker rooms and saunas.

== Alumni ==
As of 2023 there are over 95,000 living alumni of Saint Joseph's University.

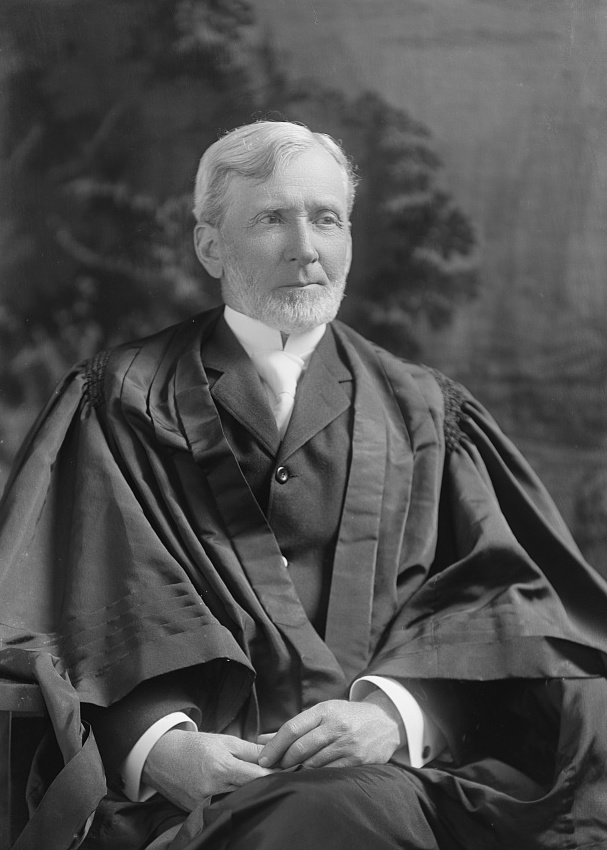
Joseph McKenna, former associate justice of the Supreme Court of the United States

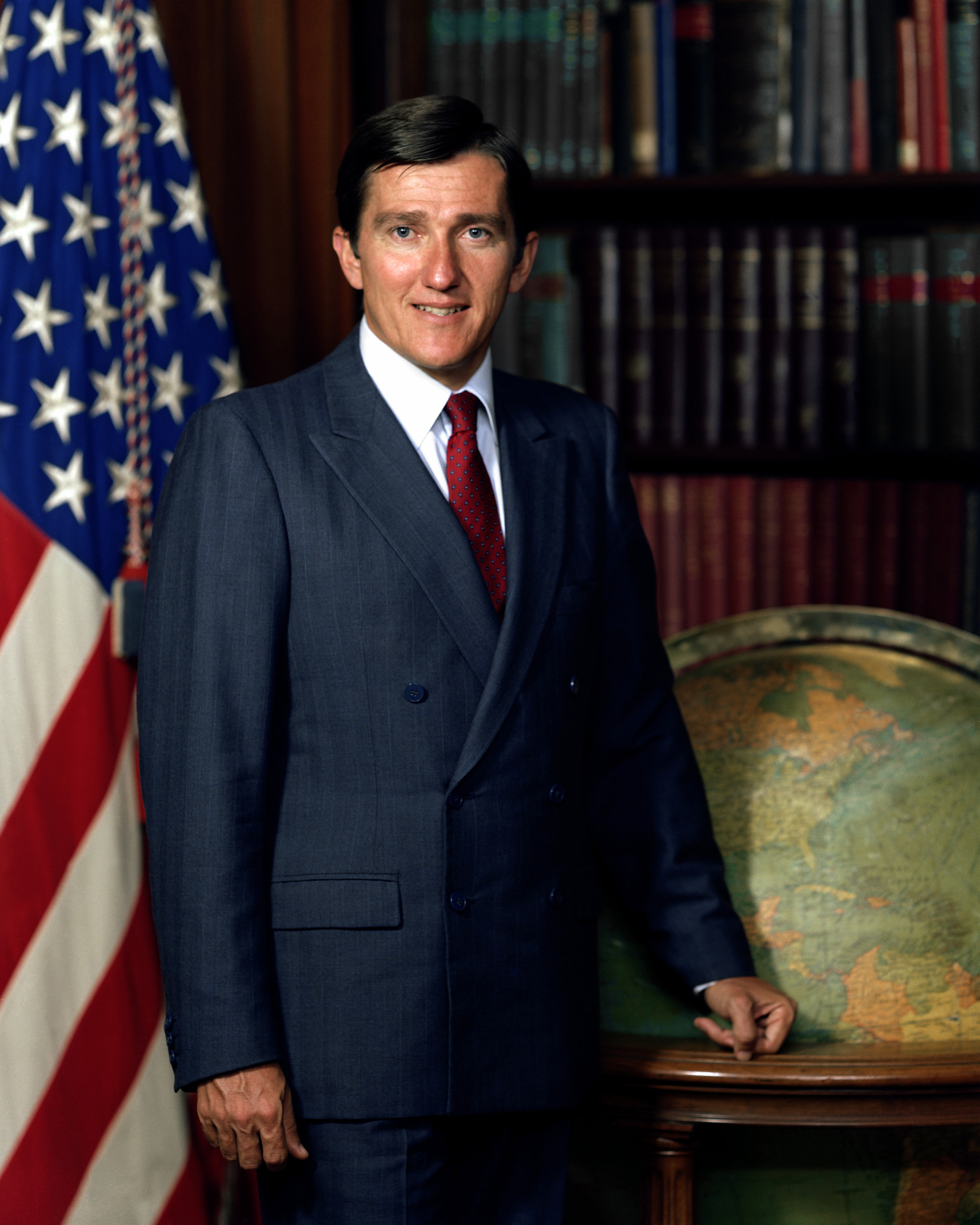
John Lehman, former United States secretary of the Navy

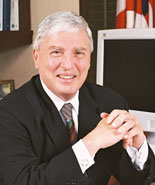
Andrew von Eschenbach, former commissioner of the FDA

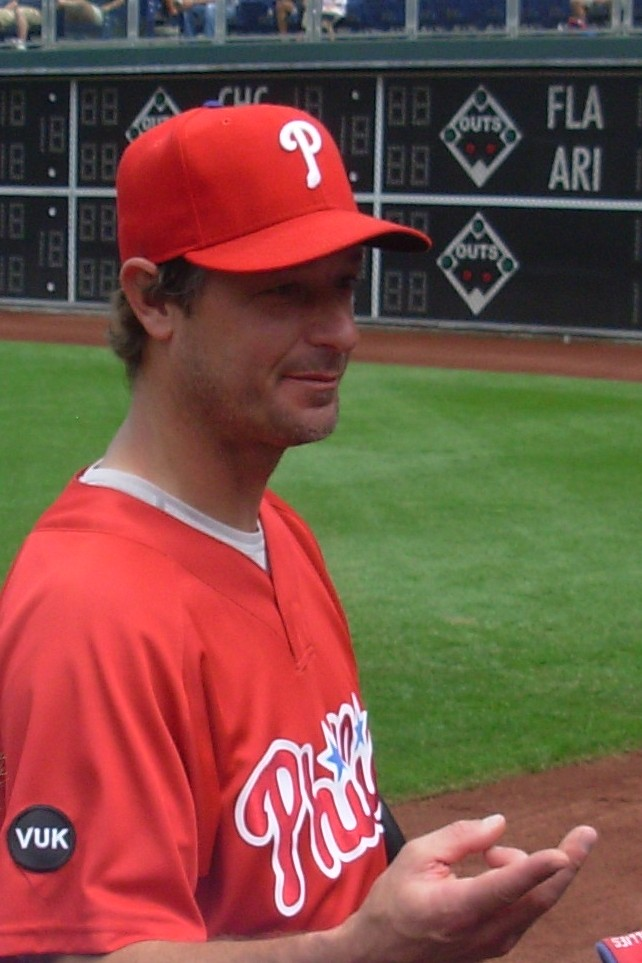
Jamie Moyer, former MLB pitcher

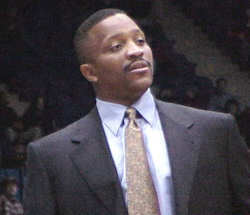
Bruiser Flint, college basketball coach

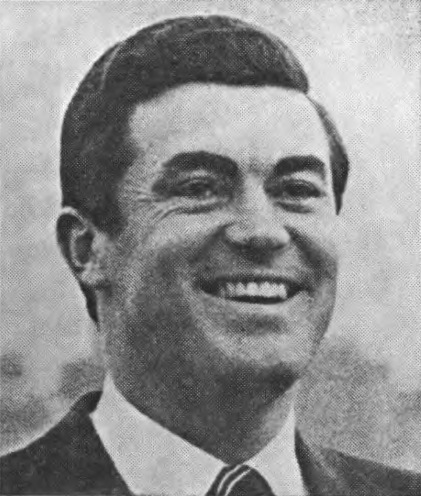
William J. Green III, former U.S. representative and former mayor of Philadelphia

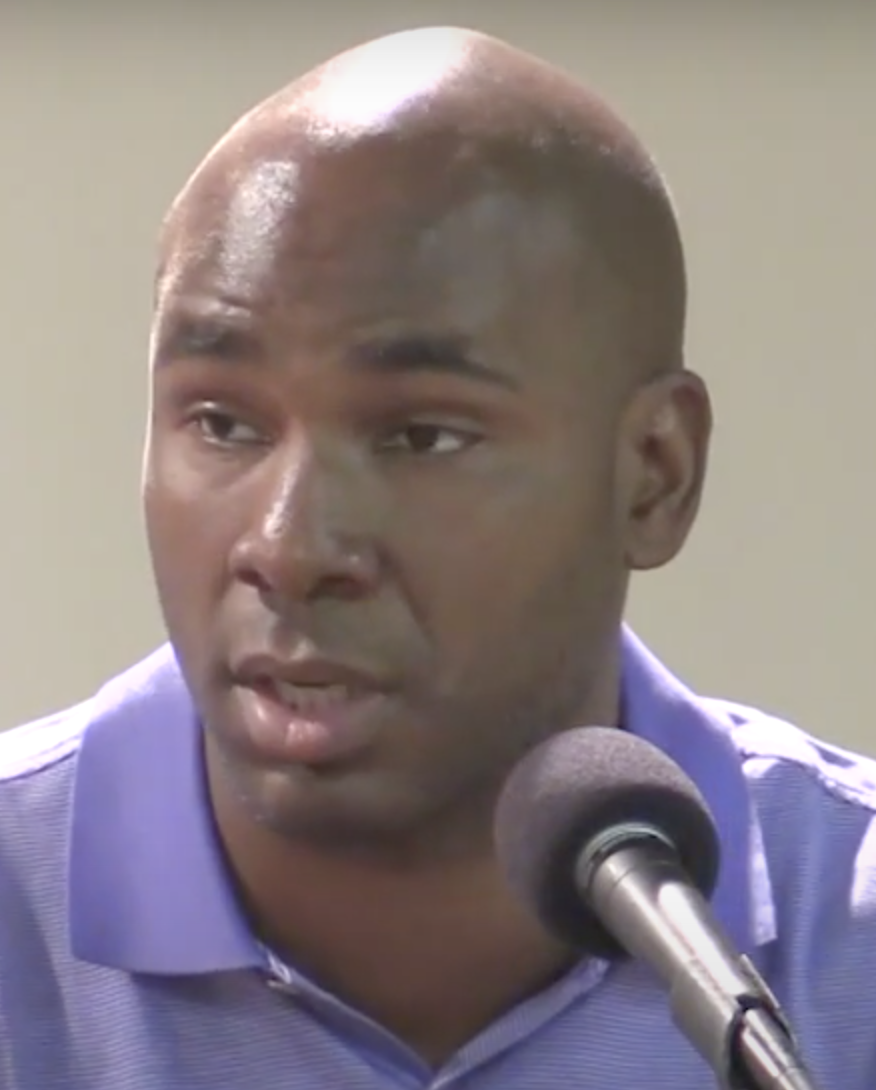
Keith Leaphart, entrepreneur and physician

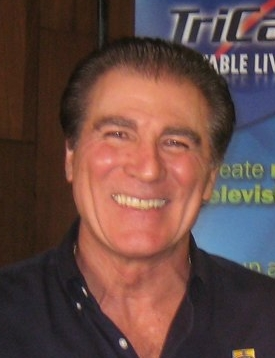
Vince Papale, former NFL wide receiver and inspiration for the film Invincible

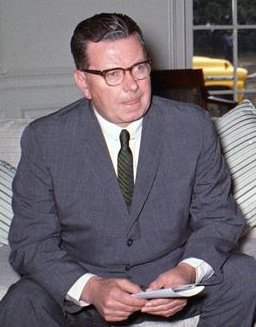
Richard J. Hughes, former governor of New Jersey

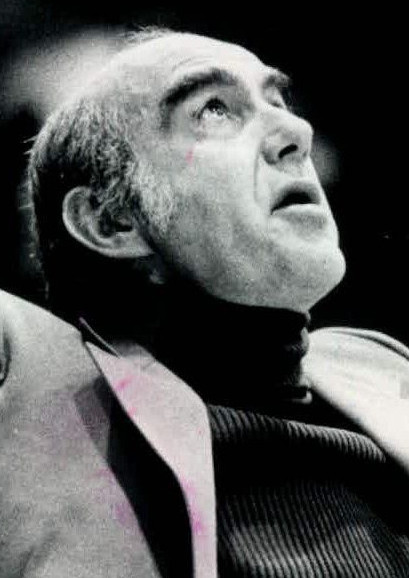
Jack Ramsay, former NBA basketball coach

Lawrence W. Pierce, former United States circuit judge of the United States Court of Appeals for the Second Circuit

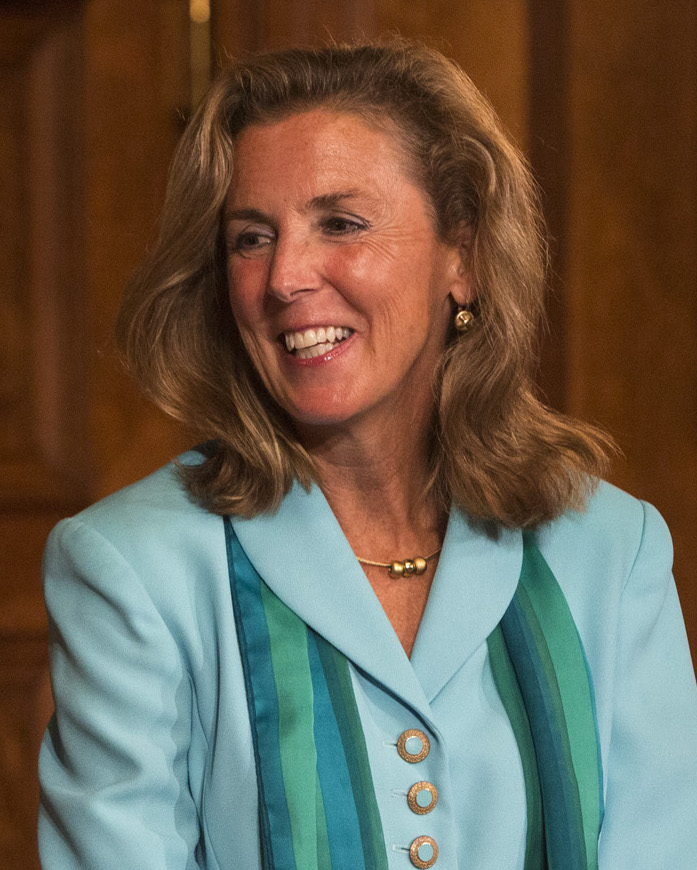
Katie McGinty, former chair of the Council on Environmental Quality

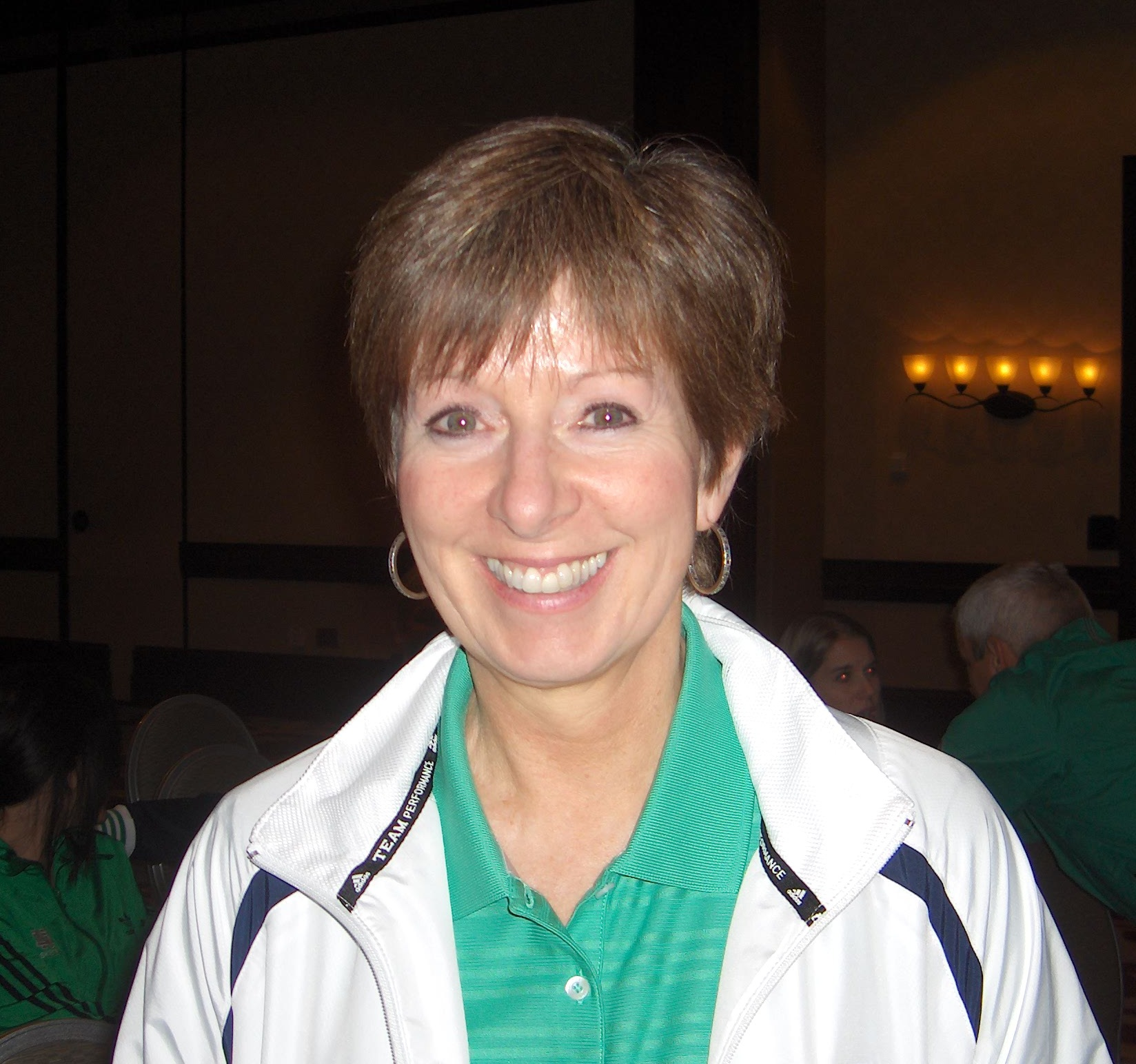
Muffet McGraw, former women's college basketball coach

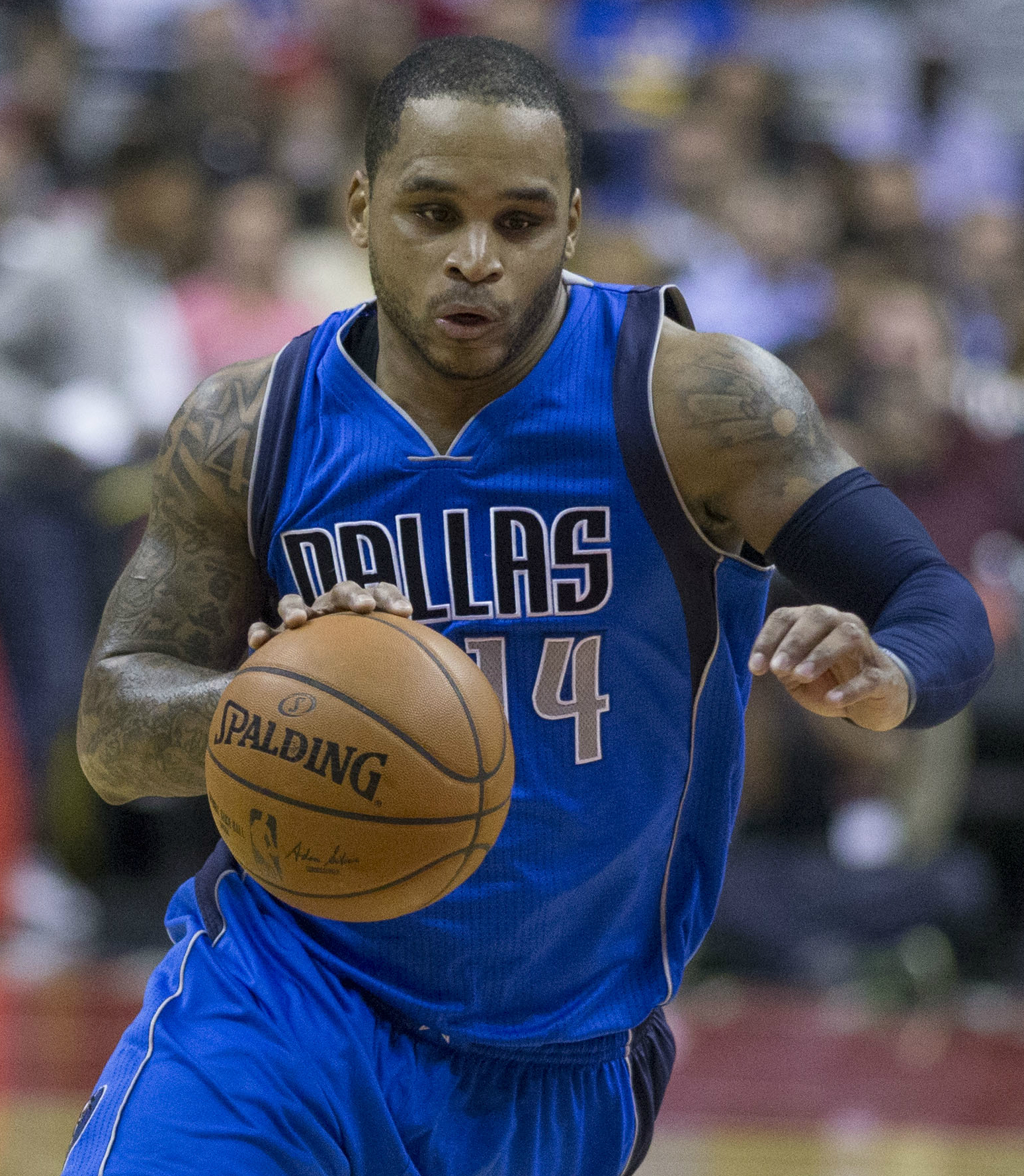
Jameer Nelson, former NBA basketball player

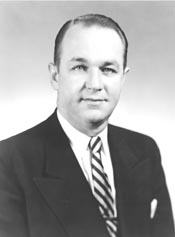
William T. Cahill, former governor of New Jersey

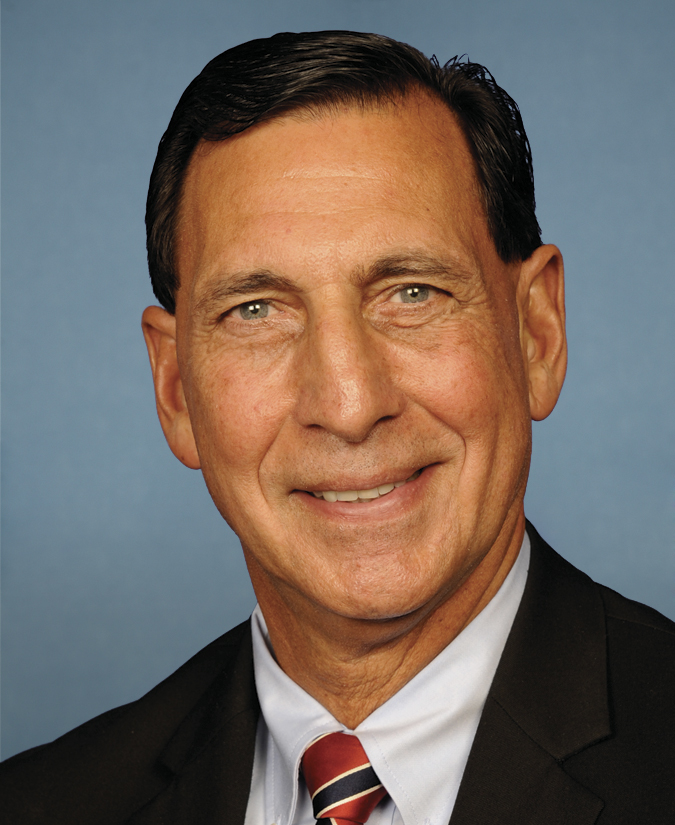
Frank LoBiondo, former U.S. congressman

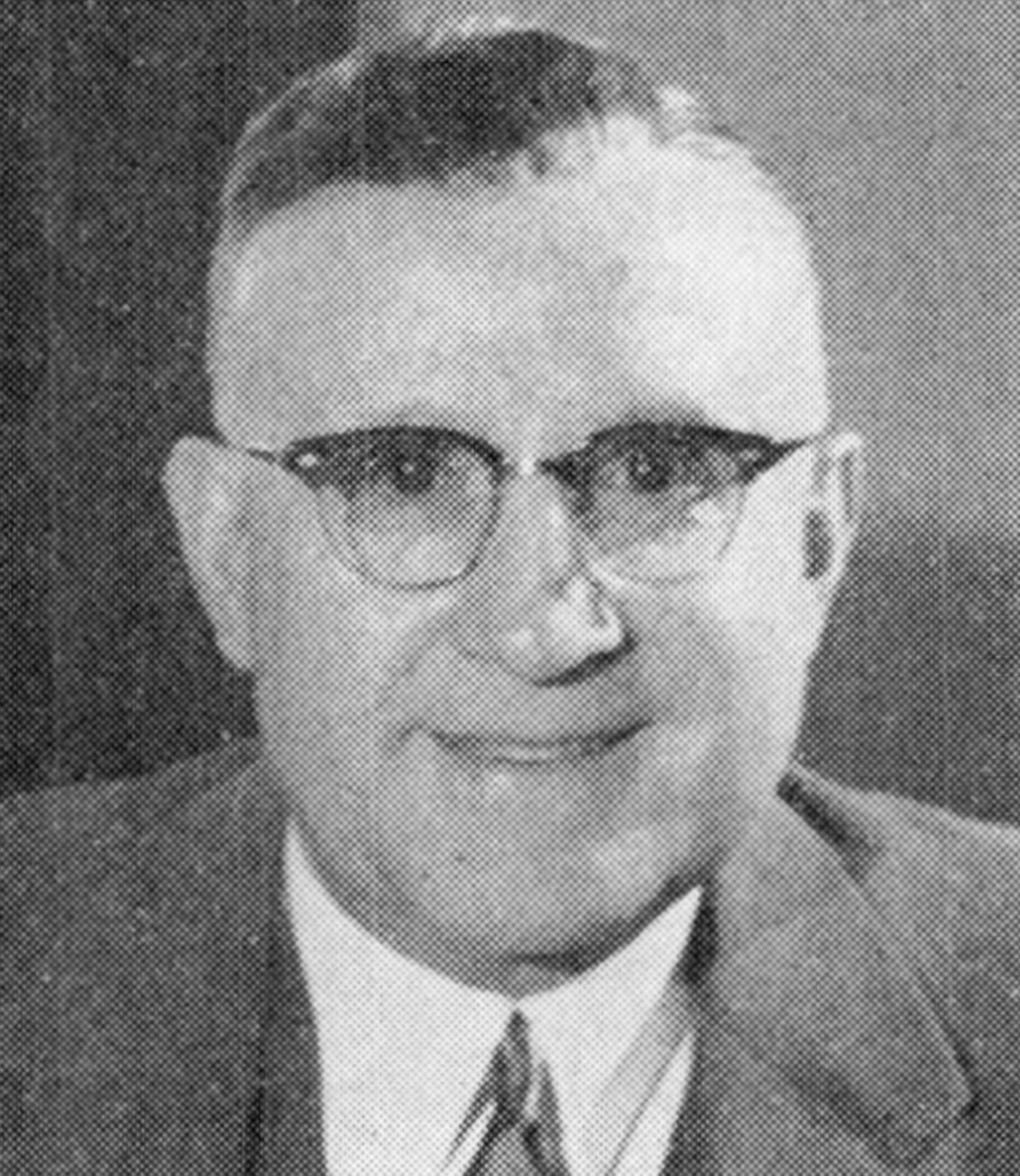
William A. Barrett, U.S. representative from Philadelphia (1945–1947, 1949–1976)

== See also ==
- List of Jesuit sites
