= List of Woodstock College people =

This is a list of people associated with Woodstock College, a former Jesuit seminary in Maryland.

== Alumni ==
- Joaquin G. Bernas
- Horacio de la Costa, first Filipino provincial general of the Society of Jesus in the Philippines
- George Coyne, director of the Vatican Observatory 1978-2006
- Royden B. Davis, dean of Georgetown College 1966–1989
- James Demske, S.J., president of Canisius College (1966–1993)
- Joseph N. Dinand, vicar apostolic of Jamaica
- J. Hunter Guthrie, president of Georgetown University
- Timothy S. Healy, 46th president of Georgetown University
- Thomas M. King, theologian
- Charles W. Lyons, president of several Catholic colleges
- James A. Martin, world's oldest Jesuit priest at the time of his death in 2007
- W. G. Read Mullan, 11th president of Boston College and 11th president of Loyola College in Maryland
- John H. O'Rourke, famous Jesuit priest (1856-1929)
- Gerard Reedy, 30th president of the College of the Holy Cross
- Harold Ridley, 23rd president of Loyola College in Maryland
- Thomas Ewing Sherman, S.J., son of William Tecumseh Sherman
- Eugene Ulrich, professor at the University of Notre Dame

== Faculty ==
- Avery Dulles (professor, 1960–1974)
- Anthony Maas (professor, 1891–1905; rector, 1907–1912)
- Leo J. O'Donovan
- Edward J. Sponga (head, 1957–1960)
