= Joseph Hanselman =

American Jesuit priest

The Very Reverend Joseph F. Hanselman
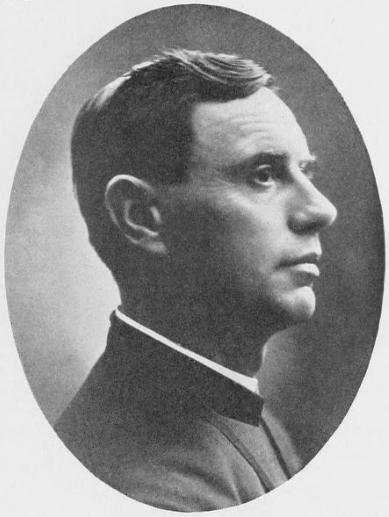

14th President of the College of the Holy Cross
- In office 1901–1906
- Preceded by: John F. Lehy
- Succeeded by: Thomas E. Murphy

Personal details
- Born: Joseph Francis Hanselman; October 28, 1856 Brooklyn, New York, U.S.
- Died: January 16, 1923 (aged 66) Rome, Italy
- Education: St. Francis Xavier College; Woodstock College

Orders
- Ordination: 1892

Joseph Francis Hanselman (October 28, 1856 – January 16, 1923) was an American Catholic priest and member of the Society of Jesus. He served as the president of the College of the Holy Cross and rector of Woodstock College. He also was the superior of the Maryland-New York Province of the Jesuits and as the American assistant to the Jesuit Superior General in Rome.

== Biography ==
Joseph Francis Hanselman was born in the Williamsburg neighborhood of the city of Brooklyn, New York (then independent of New York City), on October 28, 1856. He was born to Margaret and Henry Hanselman and had eight siblings. Of his six brothers, five became priests; both of his sisters became nuns. His brothers were James, John Thomas, George, Michael, and his sisters assumed the religious names of Vincent and Thomasina.

He attended Saint Vincent College in Pennsylvania before completing his education at St. Francis Xavier College in New York City, where he graduated in 1877. Following his secular education, Hanselman entered the Grand Séminaire de Montréal. However, soon thereafter, he instead decided to enter the Jesuit Order at West Park, New York in 1878. After some time teaching at St. Peter's College in Jersey City, he completed his formation Woodstock College and was ordained a priest in 1892.

Hanselman was made the dean of studies and discipline at the College of the Holy Cross in 1893, where he remained until being appointed the president of the college in 1901. As president, he was responsible for overseeing the construction of Alumni Hall.

He became the provincial superior of the Maryland-New York Province of the Society of Jesus on March 25, 1906, succeeding Thomas J. Gannon. He remained in this position until becoming the rector of Woodstock College in 1912; he was succeeded as provincial by Anthony Maas. In 1918, Hanselman was elevated to the position of American assistant-general to the Jesuit Superior General. He was the second person to hold this office. Unlike his predecessor, Gannon, Hanselman initially remained in the United States while holding the position, rather than move to Rome, due to the fighting of World War I. He held this post until his death in Rome on January 16, 1923. He was succeeded as the American assistant by Anthony Maas, S.J.

== Sources ==
- Devitt, Edward I. (October 1, 1933). "History of the Maryland-New York Province: IX, The Province in the Year 1833" (PDF). Woodstock Letters. LXII (3): 309–348. Archived (PDF) from the original on March 10, 2020 – via Jesuit Archives.

Academic offices
Preceded by John F. Lehy	14th President of the College of the Holy Cross; 1901–1906	Succeeded by Thomas E. Murphy
Preceded by Anthony Maas	Rector of Woodstock College; 1912–1918	Succeeded by William Clark
Catholic Church titles
Preceded by Thomas J. Gannon	18th Provincial Superior of the Jesuit Maryland-New York Province; 1906–1912	Succeeded by Anthony Maas
Preceded by Thomas J. Gannon	2nd American assistant to the Jesuit Superior General; 1918–1923	Succeeded by Anthony Maas
