= Vincent Cooke =

American Jesuit priest, academic and academic administrator

Vincent Cooke S.J.

President of Canisius College
- In office July 1, 1993 – July 1, 2010
- Preceded by: James Demske, S.J.
- Succeeded by: John J. Hurley

President of John Carroll University (acting)
- In office 1992–1992

Personal details
- Born: May 24, 1936 New York City
- Died: June 22, 2017 (aged 81) Bronx, New York
- Profession: Jesuit priest Academic administrator

Vincent M. Cooke, S.J., (May 24, 1936 – June 22, 2017) was an American Jesuit priest, academic, and academic administrator who served as the 23rd President of Canisius College, a private Jesuit college in Buffalo, New York, from 1993 to 2010.

Father Cooke is credited with transforming Canisius College from a small school, primarily attended by commuter students, into the largest private university in western New York during his 17-year tenure. Cooke oversaw 24 major building projects, including the construction of eight residential dormitories, the renovation of existing structures, the launch of Canisius' first comprehensive capital campaign in 2000, as well as a second campaign in 2007 which raised $66 million. Cooke also acquired several nearby buildings to the expand the existing campus, including the former St. Vincent de Paul Catholic Church, which was transformed into the 515-seat Montante Cultural Center in 2000.

== Biography ==
Cooke was born in New York City in 1936 and raised in nearby Hoboken, New Jersey. He graduated from Xavier High School in Manhattan and entered the Society of Jesus at the order's Bellarmine College in Plattsburgh, New York, on August 14, 1954. In 1962, he received his bachelor's degree from Fordham University. Cooke then completed his master's degree in teaching at Fordham in 1960, as well as a second master's in philosophy in 1965, also from Fordham University.

Cooke next completed advanced degrees in theology from both Woodstock College and Yale University. He was ordained as a priest of the Society of Jesus on June 15, 1967, at Fordham University Church. In 1971, Cooke obtained a doctorate in philosophy from the University of Wisconsin–Madison. He returned to Fordham University, where he taught both undergraduate and graduate level courses as an assistant professor of philosophy, philosophy courses from 1971 until 1976. He also served as the vice chair of the department of philosophy from 1973 to 1976. Cooke specialized in ethics, the philosophy of language, which explores the relationship between language and reality, and epistemology.

In 1976, Cooke was appointed vice provincial for higher education for the Society of Jesus' New York Province. In 1978, he was elevated to Provincial for the New York Province, a leadership position he held from 1978 to 1984. In 1983, Cooke was a delegate to the General Congregation 33 of the Society of Jesus, which elected Father Peter Hans Kolvenbach as the 29th Superior General of the Society of Jesus. Two decades later, Cooke once again served as a delegate to General Congregation 35 in 2008, in which Adolfo Nicolás, S.J., was elected Superior General.

Cooke returned to the faculty of Fordham University as an associate professor of philosophy from 1985 until 1991. He remained at Fordham until 1991, when he was appointed executive and academic Vice President for John Carroll University, a Jesuit university in Ohio. He briefly served as the acting President of John Carroll University for three months in 1992.

=== Canisius College ===
Father Vincent Cooke became the 23rd President of Canisius College in Buffalo on July 1, 1993. He succeeded Father James M. Demske, S.J., who had served as the college's president for 27 years.

When Cooke arrived at Canisius, he inherited a small college attended primarily by commuter students. The existing campus, which was largely centered around the Christ the King Chapel, was largely unchanged since the 1950s. Cooke soon embarked on a plan to modernize the college, strengthen its academic programs, and improve existing facilities. From 1993 to 2010, Cooke oversaw the expansion of the campus through 24 major construction or acquisition projects. These included the construction or renovation of eight residence halls and other on-campus housing options, which were intended to attract more students from outside the Buffalo metro area, at a cost of $85 million. New residential buildings included a $16.5 million townhouse project for 325 students, which opened on the site of the former Delavan Armory in 2002. In total

Under Cooke, Canisius undertook $89 million in capital spending on projects, including the residence halls, between 1994 and 2002 alone. For example, the college renovated and modernized the Old Main, the original building at Canisius College. Cooke not only focused on new construction, but also acquired existing buildings surrounding the original campus as well. Lyons Hall, which was once the Mount St. Joseph Academy high school for girls, was renovated and transformed into a new classroom and administrative building in 2000 for $9.8 million. Once opened, Lyons Hall housed new classrooms, as well as the admissions and enrollment offices.

Cooke also championed the $4 million purchase and renovation of the shuttered St. Vincent de Paul Catholic Church, a landmark Byzantine-Lombardic style former Catholic church originally opened in 1926 on Eastwood Place. The original parish had closed in 1993. Canisius spent $3.4 million to renovate the former church into the Montante Cultural Center, a 515-seat performance space which was dedicated by Father Cooke on October 23, 2000.

In 2002, Canisius College purchased the 237,000-square-foot BlueCross BlueShield complex on Main Street for $18.45 million, with plans to convert it into a major science center. Later in the mid-2000s, Cooke oversaw another acquisition of the former Sears Roebuck store, located Main and Jefferson Avenue, along with an adjacent 1,350-car parking garage. Together, the former Sears and BlueCross BlueShield were redeveloped into a modern, state-of-the-art Science Hall, which opened to students in 2012. Canisius College has previously attempted to buy the Sears Roebuck building when the store closed in 1980, but, with only a $2 million total endowment in 1980, had been unable to afford it at the time. By 2002, Cooke and his administration had grown the endowment to $43 million, which allowed the school to acquire the former Sears store later in the 2000s.

In addition to the expansion of Canisius' facilities and campus footprint, Father Cooke worked to raise Canisius' academic standards as well. He lowered the student-faculty ratio and established new undergraduate and graduate degrees. Cooke and his administration introduced several new academic majors, including accounting information systems, bioinformatics, digital media arts, health and human performance, and international business. He increased student enrollment by recruiting prospective students from outside the core Western New York region by adding new academic programs and expanding residence halls. Cooke's administration also created the Employer Housing Assistance program, which encouraged faculty and staff to buy homes near the campus.

In 2000, Cooke launched the first capital campaign in Canisius College's history. The 2000 campaign, called "Imagine Canisius," raised $39 million. Seven years later, a second, larger capital campaign, known as "A Legacy of Leadership," brought in $66 million, becoming the school's largest ever fundraiser.

In 2002, Canisius College discontinued its football program, the Canisius Golden Griffins, which proved controversial at the time. Cooke stood by the decision to end the sport, joking in 2010 that his greatest legacy would be ending Canisius' chronic on-campus parking problems.

In addition to his work at Canisius, Cooke simultaneously served as the President of the Metro Atlantic Athletic Conference (MAAC) from 1996 to 1998. He also served on the board of directors for the Buffalo Niagara Partnership. From 2004 to 2010, Father Cooke was a member of Board of Trustees of Fordham University, his alma mater, as well.

==== Recognitions ====
Cooke was recognized for his work at Canisius. In 2001, The Buffalo News named Cooke as its Buffalo News Outstanding Citizen. A separate 2001 Buffalo News poll named Cooke as the second most influential leader in Western New York. Additionally, the Erie-Niagara Chapter of the New York State Society of Professional Engineers named him "Citizen of the Year" and the Buffalo Niagara Sales and Marketing Executives honored Cooke as its "Executive of the Year," also in 2001.

Two years later, the Preservation League of New York State honored Cooke for "Excellence in Historic Preservation" for the Canisius' renovation of historic buildings in 2003. He was also given the "Renaissance Man Award" by the Buffalo Renaissance Foundation in 2003 as well.

In 2005, the Niagara Lutheran Foundation bestowed its "Humanitarian Award" on Cooke. He also received the "Citation Award for Community Leadership" from the National Federation for Just Communities of Western New York in 2007.

==== Retirement from Canisius ====
By 2010, when he retired as president after a 17-year tenure, Father Cooke had transformed Canisius College into the largest private university in Western New York. John J. Hurley, vice president and vice president for college relations, was appointed Cooke's successor, becoming the first lay president of Canisius College in its 140-year history on July 1, 2010. Cooke had originally recruited Hurley to join Canisius' administration in 1997.

Upon his retirement, Canisius College honored Cooke with its Distinguished Citizen of the Year Award and awarded him a 2010 honorary degree.

== Later life ==
Following his retirement from the presidency of Canisius, Father Cooke returned to New York City, where he served as the assistant to the provincial for higher education of the New York Province of the Society of Jesus. He later became the assistant for strategic planning for the Jesuits' Maryland, New England and New York Provinces.

Father Vincent Cooke died from pancreatic cancer at the Murray-Weigel Hall, a Jesuit infirmary at Fordham University in Fordham, the Bronx, New York City on June 22, 2017, at the age of 81. His funeral mass was held at the Fordham University Church with burial at the Jesuit Cemetery in Auriesville, New York. Canisius College scheduled a memorial mass for August 12, 2017.
