= Thomas E. Murphy (educator) =

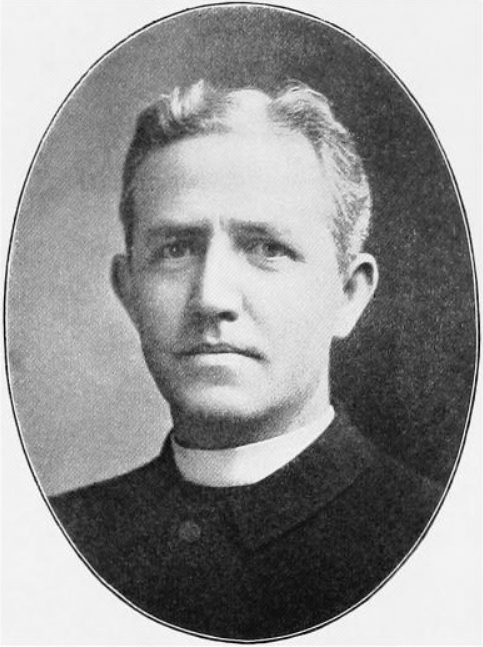
- Born: Thomas Edward Murphy; January 27, 1856 Manhattan, New York, US
- Died: December 14, 1933 (aged 77) Brooklyn, New York, US
- Occupation: Educator

Thomas Edward Murphy (January 27, 1856 – December 14, 1933) was an American educator.

== Life and career ==
He was born in Manhattan and educated in the public school system, before attending the College of St. Francis Xavier, now known as Xavier High School, in New York. He did not graduate, instead entering the Society of Jesus in 1875 in Quebec. After further studies at Woodstock College in Maryland he obtained a post at Georgetown University in Washington D.C. in 1882. In 1887 he returned to Woodstock, and in 1890 was ordained. He was dean of studies at Georgetown from 1891 to 1893, and in 1894 returned to the College of St. Francis Xavier as its president. In 1900 he became dean of studies at Holy Cross College, where he became president in 1906, resigning in 1906 to allow more time for parochial work. From 1912 until his death he was the pastor of the Church of St. Ignatius in Brooklyn.

He died at St. Mary's Hospital in Brooklyn on December 14, 1933.
