= Aloysius C. Galvin =

American Jesuit priest, administrator and teacher

Aloysius Carroll Galvin, S.J.

President of the University of Scranton
- In office 1965–1970
- Preceded by: Edward J. Sponga, S.J.
- Succeeded by: Dexter L. Hanley, S.J.

Personal details
- Born: January 15, 1925 Baltimore, Maryland, United States
- Died: November 23, 2007 (age 82) Washington, D.C., United States
- Education: Loyola University Maryland; Woodstock College
- Profession: Jesuit priest, academic

Aloysius Carroll Galvin S.J. (January 15, 1925 – November 23, 2007) was an American Jesuit priest, administrator and teacher. He served as academic dean at Loyola College in Baltimore from 1959 to 1965. He was selected as the 17th president of the University of Scranton, which he led from 1965 until 1970. Galvin spent much of the rest of his career teaching mathematics at Georgetown Prep from 1970 until 2007. Nicknamed "Wish" by his family, friends and students, he was frequently voted a favorite teacher.

== Early life ==
Aloysius Carroll Galvin was born in Baltimore, Maryland, on January 15, 1925. His parents were Agnes Mercedes (Smith) and John T. Galvin Jr., a wholesale lumber merchant. He was one of four children, with an older brother and older sister and a younger sister. Their mother Agnes died when Aloysius was just five years old. His father married again, choosing Agnes's sister, Helen Regina Smith.

Galvin attended Blessed Sacrament Parochial School in Baltimore for elementary school. He went on to graduate from Loyola High School in 1942. Galvin began attending Loyola College but dropped out in 1943 to join the United States Navy's V-12 College Training Program during World War II. It was held at Mount Saint Mary's College in Emmitsburg, Maryland.

Galvin was officially commissioned as a naval ensign at Columbia University in 1944. He served as an executive officer on board a submarine chaser in both the Atlantic and the Pacific Oceans during the war. He spent much of his time assigned to the Aleutian Islands. Following the end of the war, Galvin re-enrolled in Loyola College in 1946. He earned a bachelor's degree in 1948.

An avid athlete during his years in college, Galvin took up boxing and enjoyed playing basketball while in the Navy. The Washington Post'' referred to him as a "basketball standout" during his time as a student at Loyola College.

== Jesuits ==
Galvin entered the Society of Jesus, a Roman Catholic religious order commonly known as the Jesuits, in August 1948. He was formally ordained as a Jesuit priest on June 23, 1957, and celebrated his first Mass at St. Ignatius Roman Catholic Church on Calvert Street in Baltimore.

Galvin began his academic career when he became a high school Latin and English teacher at St. Joseph's Preparatory School in Philadelphia for one year. He left St. Joe's Prep in 1959 when he was appointed an academic dean at Loyola College. He served as dean from 1959 to 1965. He departed to become president of the University of Scranton.

Galvin was officially inaugurated as the 17th President of the University of Scranton on September 24, 1965. He is credited with changing the way that the university was governed and making it more open and inclusive for both faculty and students. He served as president of the university until 1970.

He took a teaching position at Georgetown Preparatory School, a Jesuit high school in North Bethesda, Maryland. Three days after his arrival, he suffered a massive heart attack. He spent much of 1970 and 1971 recovering and living in the school's infirmary.

Galvin returned to teaching high school math at Georgetown Prep in 1971. He continued as a teacher for much of the next four decades. He also served as the school's chaplain for the American football team. He was frequently voted as a favorite teacher by students and alumni.

Galvin taught at Georgetown Prep until the 2006–2007 school year when his health began to rapidly decline due to cancer.

== Legacy and honors ==
- Galvin was inducted into the Georgetown Prep Athletic Hall of Fame on October 26, 2007.

== Death ==
Fr. Aloysius C. Galvin died of cancer in the Jesuit community of Georgetown Preparatory School on November 23, 2007, at the age of 82. His funeral was held at the Our Lady of Lourdes Chapel at Georgetown Prep on November 26; he was buried at the Woodstock Seminary cemetery in Woodstock, Maryland on November 27.

Galvin was survived by his brother John Galvin III and sister Ella Galvin O'Conor.

Academic offices
Preceded by Edward J. Sponga	President of the University of Scranton; 1965–1970	Succeeded by Joseph A. Rock, S.J. (acting)
