= Buffalo Braves =

Basketball team (1970–1978)

- Conference: Eastern
- Division: Atlantic
- Founded: 1970
- History: Buffalo Braves; 1970–1978; San Diego Clippers; 1978–1984; Los Angeles Clippers; 1984–present
- Arena: Buffalo Memorial Auditorium
- Location: Buffalo, New York
- Team colors: Black, orange, white, light blue
- Team manager: Eddie Donovan (1970–1975)
- Head coach: Dolph Schayes (1970–1972); Johnny McCarthy (1972); Jack Ramsay (1972–1976); Tates Locke (1976–1977); Bob MacKinnon (1977); Joe Mullaney (1977); Cotton Fitzsimmons (1977–1978)
- Ownership: Paul Snyder (1970–1977); John Y. Brown Jr. (1976–1978); Harry T. Mangurian Jr. (1977–1978) (minority partner)
- Championships: 0
- Conference titles: 0
- Division titles: 0
- Playoff appearances: 3 (1974, 1975, 1976)

The Buffalo Braves were an American professional basketball team based in Buffalo, New York. Founded in 1970, the Braves competed in the National Basketball Association (NBA) as a member of the Atlantic Division of the Eastern Conference. In 1978, owner John Y. Brown Jr. swapped franchises with then-Boston Celtics owner Irv Levin, who then moved the team to San Diego, where it was renamed the San Diego Clippers. The franchise relocated to Los Angeles in 1984, becoming the Los Angeles Clippers.

== History ==
=== Play begins ===
The Braves were one of three NBA expansion teams that began to play in the 1970–71 season (the others being the Portland Trail Blazers and Cleveland Cavaliers). It was originally owned by Neuberger Loeb, a New York City investment firm that had few ties to Buffalo. However, a series of missteps resulted in the league taking control of the team before it even played a preseason game. By opening night, Paul Snyder, a then 33-year-old entrepreneur who had recently cashed in on the sale of his Freezer Queen business, had bought the franchise for $4 million. They played their home games at the Buffalo Memorial Auditorium, sharing the arena with another new franchise, the National Hockey League (NHL)'s Buffalo Sabres, who also debuted in 1970, as well as local college basketball teams that had used the auditorium for decades prior. Because the Braves only had third choice of dates (behind the Sabres and Canisius College Golden Griffins) at the auditorium, from 1971 to 1975 the Braves were forced to play a total of 16 home games at Maple Leaf Gardens in Toronto; in addition to alleviating the auditorium's scheduling issues, the Braves also played internationally in the hopes of expanding their fan base beyond Western New York and into the Greater Toronto Area (a similar strategy was employed by the National Football League (NFL)'s Buffalo Bills from 2008 to 2013). The NBA had two previous teams in Upstate New York, the Rochester Royals and the Syracuse Nationals (who are now known as the Sacramento Kings and Philadelphia 76ers, respectively). As of 2026, the Braves are the last New York State-based NBA team to be based somewhere other than New York City, where the New York Knicks and Brooklyn Nets play.

=== Initial hiring ===
The team's first head coach was Hall of Famer Dolph Schayes and the franchise's first star players were Bob Kauffman and Don May, who were acquired in the 1970 NBA expansion draft. However, in the NBA draft of 1970, Buffalo passed on hometown hero Calvin Murphy, a 5-foot-9 point guard from Niagara University, and picked Princeton graduate John Hummer as their first round draft pick. Murphy would eventually be inducted into the Hall of Fame. As is typical of first-year expansion teams, the Braves finished with a dismal record, 22–60, seven games ahead of the Cleveland Cavaliers, their expansion cousins, who finished at 15–67. Kauffman, who averaged 4.3 points per game the previous year with the Chicago Bulls, led Buffalo in scoring with 20.4 points per game and earned a spot on the 1971 NBA Eastern Conference All-Star team.

=== Season-by-season summary ===
==== 1971–72 season ====
The Braves repeated their 22–60 record in the 1971–72 season, but made acquisitions that would prove to improve the team. Buffalo drafted center Elmore Smith from Kentucky State University and local favorite Randy Smith from Buffalo State College. Johnny McCarthy replaced Schayes one game into the season as the team's head coach.

==== 1972–73 and 1973–74 seasons ====
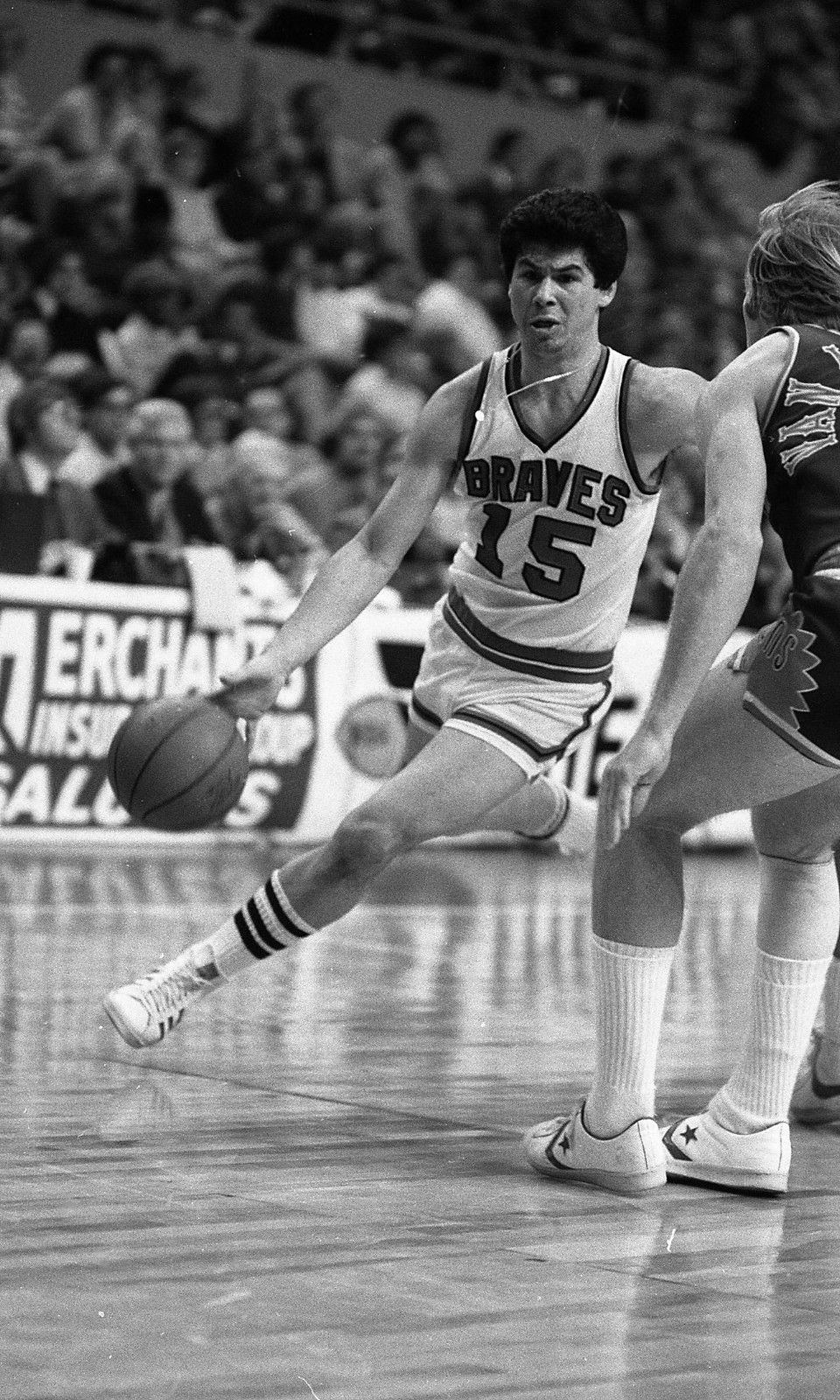
Ernie DiGregorio was named NBA Rookie of the Year in 1973–74 after leading the NBA in assists and free throw percentage.

The team did slightly worse in the 1972–73 season, as it went 21–61 under new head coach Dr. Jack Ramsay. In a showcase of the futility of the '72-'73 Braves, during the team's fifth game of the season on October 20, 1972, the team set an NBA record which still stands for most points in a single quarter with 58 in the fourth quarter against the Boston Celtics. However the Celtics were in the process of a blowout win and had already led the Braves 103–60 at the start of the quarter. They had inserted their substitutes to play the final quarter and the reduced quality of the opponents allowed for the comeback. The Braves outscored the Celtics 58-23 but still lost 126–118. The Braves' big move that season was drafting forward/center Bob McAdoo from North Carolina. The team finally made its first playoff appearance in 1974, in which they faced the Celtics and lost in six games. That season, McAdoo posted averages of 30.6 points and 15.1 rebounds; this is the last time any player has averaged at least 30 points and 15 rebounds in the same NBA season. Also, that season, the Braves rookie Ernie DiGregorio won the NBA Rookie of the Year Award.

==== 1974–75 and 1975–76 seasons ====
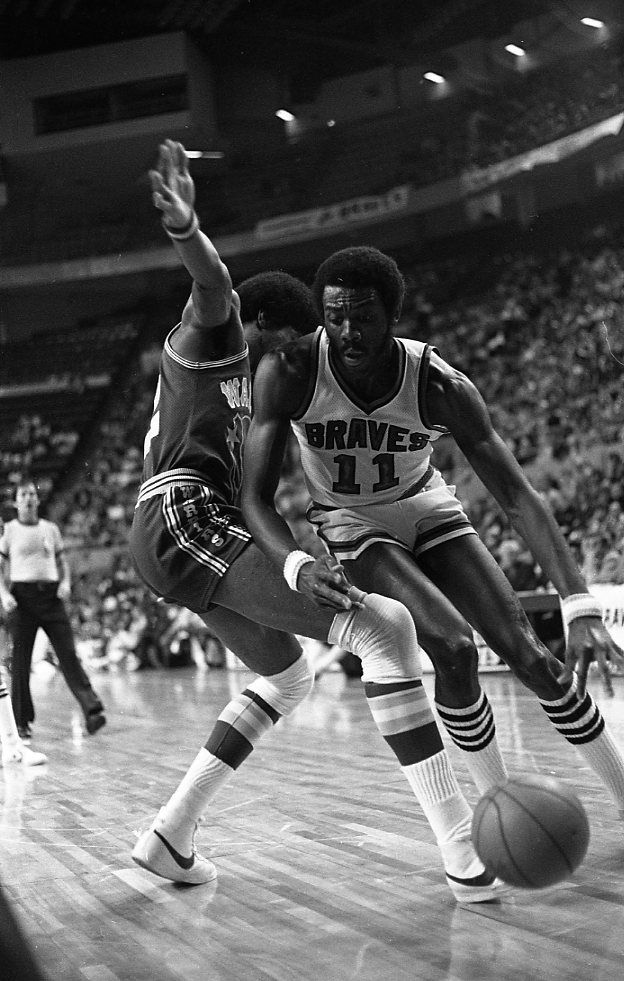
Bob McAdoo (11) was the NBA MVP in the 1974–75 season after averaging 34.5 points per game and 14.1 rebounds per game.

In 1974–75, McAdoo was awarded the NBA Most Valuable Player Award, averaging 34.5 points, 14.1 rebounds. and 2.12 blocks per game, while shooting 51.2% from the field and 80.5% from the free-throw line. The Braves made trips to the playoffs in both 1974–75 and 1975–76, the latter of which would be their last playoff berth playing in Buffalo.

==== 1976–77 season ====
The Braves by this point were a modest success, both on the court and off; the team was drawing close to the league average in fans, had solid broadcasting ratings and was turning a consistent profit. Even so, by 1976 Snyder was facing severe pressure to sell the team and get it out of Buffalo. As a result of the Braves only getting the third choice of dates at the Aud, the entire NBA was unable to finalize a schedule and hammer out television contracts until the Sabres and Griffins finalized their schedules. The NBA considered this untenable, and gave Snyder five years to resolve the problem. In a 2016 interview with The Buffalo News as part of a retrospective on the Braves, Snyder laid particular blame on Canisius president Father James Demske for making it difficult to get good home dates at the Aud. Snyder recalled offering Demske $125,000 per game to give up some Saturday night dates to the Braves. However, Demske turned the offer down, believing that the Braves posed a threat to the Little Three rivalry in college basketball. When the five-year deadline expired without a resolution, Snyder found himself with two options–build a new arena or sell the team. Building a new arena wasn't financially realistic at the time, leaving Snyder with no option but to sell the team. Had the dispute been resolved, the Braves would have likely been able to stay in Buffalo, especially since Canisius basketball went into what would be permanent decline in the early 1980s and retreated to its on-campus Koessler Athletic Center in 1999.

At the time, Snyder's more public feuds were with the Sabres, whose owners, Northrup and Seymour Knox, represented Buffalo's old money circuit while Snyder had nouveau riche status. Years later, Snyder attributed these feuds to his own inexperience with sports ownership and spoke in more conciliatory tones regarding his former hockey competition in the last years of his life. Outside observers noted that this might have been a degree of revisionist history on Snyder's part, as Snyder had partnered with Sabres president Larry Quinn on a hotel project in the 1990s. Broadcaster Pete Weber, who arrived in Buffalo just as Snyder's public feuds were emerging in early 1976, suspected that Snyder may have been acting as a "black hat" whose volatility had sabotaged his own franchise, and noted that the Golden Griffins had occupied only eight games at the Auditorium in 1976, a figure he felt was too small to cause a problem in scheduling with the Braves.

The June 15, 1976 issue of Buffalo's Courier-Express blasted the headline "Braves Go to Florida, Leaving 'Hockey Town'". Snyder had a handshake deal to sell the team for $6.1 million to hotel owner Irving Cowan, who would move the Braves to the Hollywood Sportatorium outside of Miami. However, the city of Buffalo filed a $10 million damage suit to block the move. The sale eventually fell through and the Braves and the city signed a new 15-year Memorial Auditorium lease in July with a provision that the lease could be voided if the team did not sell 5,000 season tickets in any season. Later that summer, Snyder finally sold 50% of the franchise to businessman John Y. Brown Jr., who had previously owned the Kentucky Colonels of the American Basketball Association (ABA). Brown later acquired the remaining half from Snyder sometime in the 1976–77 season with the intention of reviving the Colonels by relocating the Braves to Louisville. Unable to find a willing co-owner for such a venture, he resold the other stake to another businessman, Harry T. Mangurian Jr.

Brown and Mangurian proceeded to dismantle the Braves. Ramsay, unwilling to have his career hurt by the change in ownership, left for the Portland Trail Blazers, who would win the NBA championship in the upcoming 1976–77 season. A provision in the team sale agreement stipulated that if Brown sold the contract of any Braves player, then the money would go to Snyder and the purchase price would be reduced. This subsequently occurred when the Braves sent McAdoo to the New York Knicks for players and cash midway through the season. Before the first game of the season, the Braves also managed to acquire eventual Hall-of-Fame center Moses Malone from Portland. However, after just two games in which he played a total of six minutes, he too was traded; he was sent to Houston for two draft picks. He would finish the season in Houston averaging 13 points and 13 rebounds while only two years later winning his first of three MVP Awards. The Braves would go through four head coaches in the next two seasons: Tates Locke, Bob MacKinnon, Joe Mullaney (formerly coach of the Colonels) and Cotton Fitzsimmons. Fitzsimmons (who would find himself in a nearly identical situation seven years later when his next team the Kansas City Kings relocated to Sacramento) jokingly took the blame for the Braves' relocation and acknowledged that the NBA had given Buffalo a "raw deal."

==== 1977–78 season ====
The team's poor play in its final two years (30–52 in 1976–77 and 27–55 in 1977–78) and the overt attempts to break the lease on Memorial Auditorium drove attendance down below the threshold that would have been needed to break the lease. John Y. Brown met with Irv Levin, who then owned the Celtics, and negotiated a deal in which the owners would swap franchises, with Brown taking control of the Celtics and Levin getting the Braves. Levin was a California businessman, and wanted to own an NBA team in his native state. However, he knew the NBA would not even consider letting him move the Celtics. He was therefore very receptive to Brown's offer. The deal was brokered by then NBA general counsel David Stern, who became the league's commissioner in 1984. Following what would be the Braves' final season in Western New York, the NBA owners voted 21–1 to let the team move. As Levin wanted, he became owner of a team in San Diego after the 1977–78 season, which became the San Diego (now Los Angeles) Clippers. As part of the transaction, the teams traded most of the players on their rosters. Mangurian would acquire Brown's stake in the Celtics in 1979 as Brown sought (and won) the office of Governor of Kentucky.

== Team colors ==
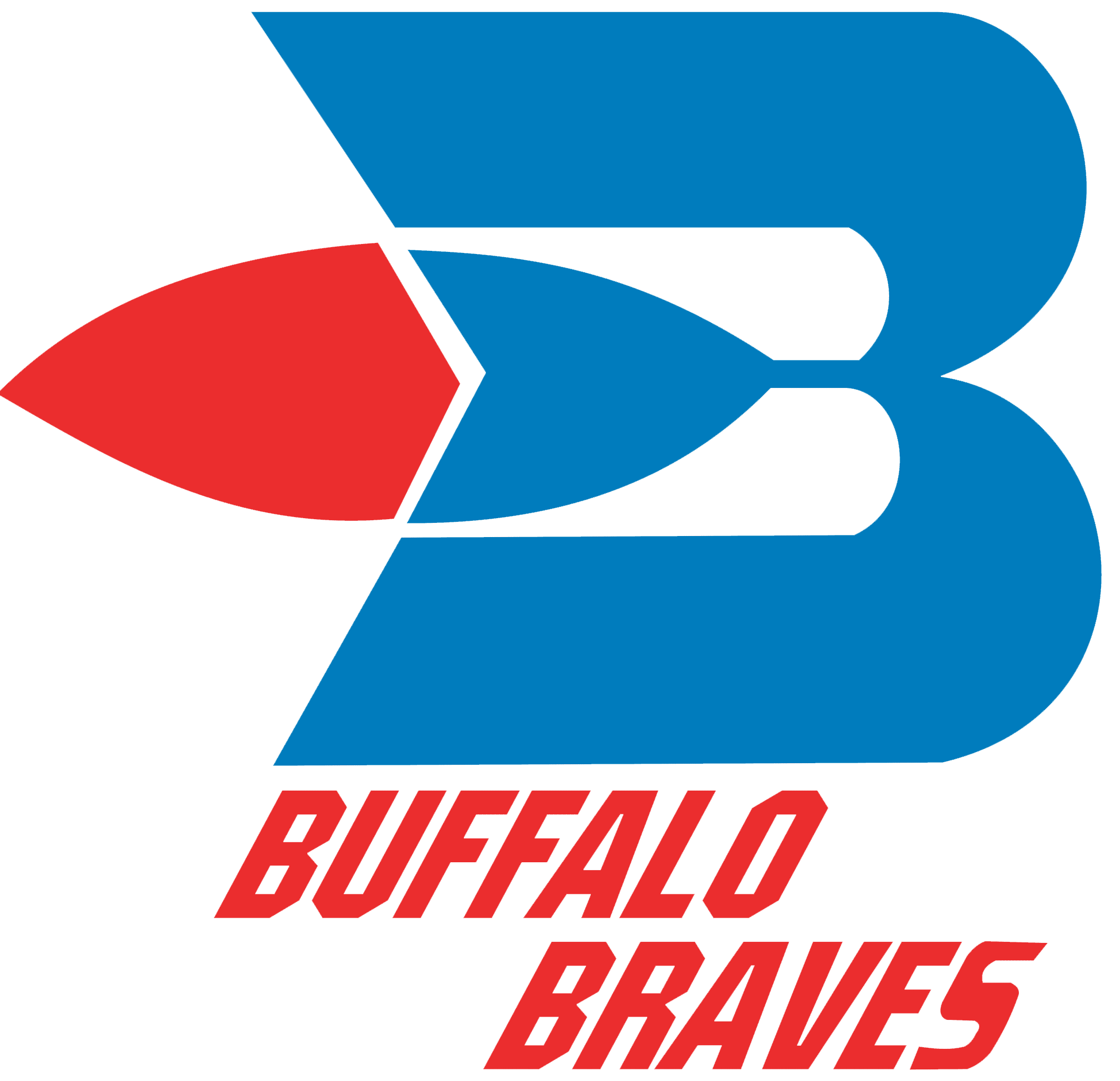
Blue and red variant of the Braves' logo.

For the franchise's first season (1970–71) team colors were blue, red & gold; home white uniforms featured lettering and striping in only red & gold, with road uniforms being blue, also with red & gold lettering and striping. In the second season, (1971–72) the team adopted the colors of the Baltimore Orioles. This was with the heavy influence of the local uniform supplier, James (Jim) Ludtka. Ludtka was a former pro baseball player with the New York Yankees and was scouting for the Orioles organization. The new color scheme was white, orange and black, with the now familiar "feather B" logo featured on uniforms that had diagonal stripes across both jerseys and shorts (the predominant color on the road being orange). This scheme was kept one more season (1972–73) and, with the 1973–74 season, the team adopted another new color scheme of Columbia blue and white, with uniforms including black accents outlining the lettering and also striping on jerseys and shorts; they continued with these uniforms until the team was moved to California. (Despite the new color scheme, the logo – which no longer appeared on the uniforms – remained the black and orange "feather B").

== Clippers acknowledgement and naming issues ==
Since Steve Ballmer bought the team, the history of the Braves has been acknowledged through occasional throwback uniforms during Clipper games and Buffalo throwback merchandise being made available through team venues, though any explicit Native American references outside the city name, the Braves name itself, and "feather B" logo have been de-emphasized, with the original "feather sunburst" logo remaining unused. The team's name, said at the time to be a tribute to the Seneca Nation of Indians, came well before the controversy of Native American names in sports beginning in the 1990s came to light, and the Braves nickname has been said to have been a "curse" upon the franchise from the start. The Clippers refused to relinquish the Braves trademark in 2005 when an expansion American Basketball Association franchise wanted to use it, so that team instead became the Buffalo Rapids.

== Basketball Hall of Famers ==
Buffalo Braves Hall of Famers
Players
No.	Name	Position	Tenure	Inducted
11	Bob McAdoo	F/C	1972–1976	2000
20	Moses Malone	C/F	1976	2001
44	Adrian Dantley	F/G	1976–1977	2008
Coaches
Name		Position	Tenure	Inducted
Jack Ramsay		Head coach	1972–1976	1992
Contributors
Cotton Fitzsimmons		Head coach	1977–1978	2021

== Individual awards ==
NBA Most Valuable Player Award

- Bob McAdoo – 1975

NBA Rookie of the Year

- Bob McAdoo – 1973
- Ernie DiGregorio – 1974
- Adrian Dantley – 1977

NBA Executive of the Year

- Eddie Donovan – 1974

All-NBA First Team

- Bob McAdoo – 1975

All-NBA Second Team

- Bob McAdoo – 1974
- Randy Smith – 1976

NBA All-Rookie First Team

- Elmore Smith – 1972
- Bob McAdoo – 1973
- Ernie DiGregorio – 1974
- John Shumate – 1976
- Adrian Dantley – 1977

=== NBA All-Star Weekend ===
NBA All-Star selections

- Bob Kauffman – 1971, 1972, 1973
- Bob McAdoo – 1974, 1975, 1976
- Randy Smith – 1976, 1978

NBA All-Star Game Most Valuable Player

- Randy Smith – 1978

== Broadcasting ==
For most of the team's existence, WBEN (930 AM) was the radio home of the Buffalo Braves, with Van Miller on play-by-play. Miller also called play-by-play on the team's telecasts over WBEN-TV (channel 4, now WIVB-TV), the local CBS television affiliate. Snyder claimed that the Braves broadcasts were drawing far higher ratings than the Sabres at the time and insisted that if he had managed to keep the Braves in Buffalo, the Sabres would have been the team eventually forced to move out of the city.

== Season-by-season records ==
League champions	Conference champions	Division champions	Playoff berth

Season	Team	League	Conference	Division	Regular Season						Postseason results
Season	Team	League	Conference	Division	Conf. Finish	Div. Finish	Wins	Losses	Win%	GB	Postseason results
1970–71	1970–71	NBA	Eastern	Atlantic	7th	4th	22	60	.268	30	
1971–72	1971–72	NBA	Eastern	Atlantic	8th	4th	22	60	.268	34	
1972–73	1972–73	NBA	Eastern	Atlantic	7th	3rd	21	61	.256	47	
1973–74	1973–74	NBA	Eastern	Atlantic	4th	3rd	42	40	.512	14	Lost conference semifinals to Boston Celtics, 2–4
1974–75	1974–75	NBA	Eastern	Atlantic	3rd	2nd	49	33	.598	11	Lost conference semifinals to Washington Bullets, 3–4
1975–76	1975–76	NBA	Eastern	Atlantic	5th	2nd	46	36	.561	8	Won First round vs. Philadelphia 76ers, 2–1; Lost conference semifinals to Boston Celtics, 2–4
1976–77	1976–77	NBA	Eastern	Atlantic	10th	4th	30	52	.366	20	
1977–78	1977–78	NBA	Eastern	Atlantic	10th	4th	27	55	.329	28	
Relocated to San Diego

Statistic	Wins	Losses	W–L%
Buffalo Braves regular season record (1970–1978)	259	397	.395
Buffalo Braves postseason record (1970–1978)	9	13	.409
All-time regular and postseason record	268	410	.395
