= Thomas J. Reese =

American Catholic Jesuit priest, author, and journalist

Thomas J. Reese, SJ (born 1945) is an American Jesuit priest, author, and journalist. He is a senior analyst at Religion News Service, a former columnist at National Catholic Reporter, and a former editor-in-chief of America.

== Life and works ==
He was an associate editor of America from 1978 to 1985, where he wrote about a variety of topics including public policy, politics, the American Catholic bishops, and dance.

He was a senior fellow at the Woodstock Theological Center from 1985 to 1998, where he wrote a trilogy on the politics and organization of the Catholic Church.

He was also a visiting fellow at the Woodrow Wilson International Center for Scholars from 1994 to 1995

He returned to America as editor-in-chief from 1998 to 2005. During his tenure as editor, the magazine supported the consistent ethic of life as espoused by Cardinal Joseph Bernardin, supported the social justice teachings of the church, opposed the 2003 invasion of Iraq, reported on Catholic Church sexual abuse cases, and encouraged discussion of issues facing the church.

While he was editor, the magazine won awards from the Catholic Press Association.

As editor of a journal of opinion, he published a variety of authors, some critical of Vatican positions. He was forced by the Vatican to resign from America in 2005.

He subsequently spent a sabbatical year at Santa Clara University, where he continued to contribute during the summers of 2010 to 2020 as a visiting scholar at the Markkula Center for Applied Ethics.

In 2006 he returned as a fellow at the Woodstock Theological Center in Washington, D.C. Reese wrote for the National Catholic Reporter from 2013 to 2017, and was senior analyst there. In 2017, he became senior analyst at Religion News Service. He was appointed to the U.S. Commission on International Religious Freedom by President Barack Obama in 2014 and in 2016 was elected chair of the commission. His term as commissioner expired at the end of May 2018.

== Views ==
As a high school student and young seminarian, Reese was a Goldwater Republican, and when he entered the Jesuit novitiate in 1962, he was comfortable with the Catholic Church of the 1950s in which he was raised. His political science training and his disillusionment with the Vietnam War made him more politically progressive. The Second Vatican Council made him more theologically progressive with a greater understanding of the liturgy, the role of the church in the world, social justice, ecumenism and interreligious relations.

In 2018, he argued that the anti-abortion movement "should strongly support programs that give women a real choice — increasing the minimum wage, free or affordable day care for working and student moms, free or affordable health care for mothers and their children, parental leave programs, education and job-training programs, income and food supplements, etc." It "also has to support birth control as a means of avoiding unwanted pregnancies" as a "lesser of two evils" in reducing the number of abortions.

He also argued that the prohibition of artificial contraception in Humanae vitae was a 'mistake' and that a majority of American Catholics ignore it. He said that arguing that contraception led "to conjugal infidelity, disrespect for women, gender confusion, and gay marriage" is "an insult to all the good people who have used contraceptives at some point in their lives." Cardinal Timothy Dolan expressed his "serious reservations" to Reese's proposed strategy, "considering it a capitulation to the abortion culture, and a grave weakening of the powerful pro-life witness."

In a 2021 column, Reese outlined several liturgical reforms he would like to see, and criticized the Tridentine Mass as well as Pope Benedict's 2007 document Summorum Pontificum which gave priest the option to celebrate the Latin Mass without their bishop's permission. Reese said that the authority over the use of the Tridentine Mass should be returned to the bishops in their dioceses. "The church needs to be clear that it wants the unreformed liturgy to disappear and will only allow it out of pastoral kindness to older people who do not understand the need for change," he wrote. "Children and young people should not be allowed to attend such Masses." The article drew strong backlash from Traditionalist Catholics, who said that Reese was being hypocritical and encouraging authoritarianism to deal with people he disagrees with.

On NCR, Reese has asserted that climate change is the "No. 1 pro-life issue" facing the Catholic Church today.

== Publications ==
=== Books ===
- The Politics of Taxation. Westport, Connecticut: Greenwood Press, 1980.
- Archbishop: Inside the Power Structure of the American Catholic Church, San Francisco: Harper & Row, 1989.
- Episcopal Conferences: Historical, Canonical, and Theological Studies (editor), Washington, DC: Georgetown University Press, 1989. ISBN 9780878403660
- The Universal Catechism Reader (editor), San Francisco: HarperCollins, 1990.
- A Flock of Shepherds: The National Conference of Catholic Bishops, Kansas City, Missouri: Sheed & Ward, 1992.
- Inside the Vatican: The Politics and Organization of the Catholic Church, Cambridge, Massachusetts: Harvard University Press, 1996 ISBN 9780674932609
  In Het Vaticaan: De Organisatie van de Macht in de Katholieke Kerk, Amsterdam: Uitgeverij Bert Bakker, 1998.
  Im Inneren des Vatikan: Politik und Organisation der katholischen Kirche, Frankfurt am Main: S. Fischer, 1998.
  O Vaticano por dentro: A Política e a Organização da Igreja Católica, Bauru, Brasil: Editora da Universidade do Sagrado Coração, 1999.
  No Interior do Vaticano: A Política e Organização da Igreja Católica, Portugal: Publicações Europa-América, Lda., 1998.
- NCR eBook, Caring for Our Common Home: A Readers’ Guide and Commentary on Pope Francis’ Encyclical on the Environment (2015).

=== Monographs ===
- Communication II: Decision-Making Examined, Jesuit Self-Study California/Oregon Provinces, 1969.
- The Generation Gap, Jesuit Self-Study California/Oregon Provinces, 1971.
- 95th Congress Rated on Tax Reform, Arlington, VA: Taxation with Representation, 1978.
- Co-Discipleship in Action: Bishops and Laity in Dialogue, Woodstock Theological Center, 1991.

=== Articles and Columns ===
- Articles in America magazine
- "This Catholic View" for Washington Post's Georgetown/On Faith site
- Articles in the National Catholic Reporter
- Columns at Religion News Service
