= James Demske =

American Jesuit priest and educator

James Demske S.J.

President of Canisius College
- In office 1966 – July 1, 1993
- Preceded by: ?
- Succeeded by: Vincent Cooke, S.J.

Personal details
- Born: c. 1922
- Died: June 15, 1994 (aged 71–72) Buffalo, New York
- Education: University of Freiburg (Ph.D.); University of Innsbruck; Woodstock College; Canisius College (B.A.)
- Profession: Jesuit priest Academic administrator

James M. Demske, S.J., (c. 1922 – June 15, 1994) was an American Jesuit priest, academic, academic administrator and, expert on existentialism. Demske served as the President of Canisius College, a private Jesuit college in Buffalo, New York, for 27-years from 1966 until 1993. Under Demske's administration, Canisius College established its school of business. Demske also increased Canisius' endowment from just $1 million in 1966 to more than $27 million by 1993.

== Biography ==
Demske, a native of Buffalo, New York, began his studies at Canisius College prior to World War II. He left Canisius during the war to enlist in the United States Army, where he served as an Army captain and company commander in the European theatre of World War II.

Demske returned to Canisius College following the war and received his Bachelor's of Arts degree in 1947. He entered the Society of Jesus, also in 1947. He received a licentiate in philosophy the former Woodstock College in Maryland in 1951, as well as a licentiate in theology in 1958 from the University of Innsbruck in Austria. In 1957, he was ordained as a Jesuit priest in Innsbruck. Demske later completed his doctorate in philosophy at the University of Freiburg in West Germany in 1962.

Demske taught philosophy at St. Peter's College (now known as Saint Peter's University) in Jersey City, New Jersey, from 1951 to 1954. He then became a professor of theology and Master of Novices at the former Bellarmine College seminary in Plattsburgh, New York, from 1963 until 1966. An expert on existentialist philosophy, authored a number of books on the subject, including a textbook, "Introductory Metaphysics," in 1955; "Encounters with Silence" (1960), which examined existentialist philosophy; and "Being, Man and Death" (1970), which explored the philosophy of German philosopher, Martin Heidegger.

=== Canisius College ===
In 1966, Father Demske became the President of Canisius College, his alma mater. Demske oversaw the expansion of Canisius during his 27-year tenure from 1966 until 1993. Demske nearly doubled the total student enrollment at Canisius to approximately 4,700 students by 1994, marking a 70% increase in enrollment. Demske established the School of Business, which accounted for one-third of all students by the 1990s. He also expanded Canisius' elementary and secondary education majors.

Under Demske's administration, Canisius' endowment grew from just $1 million in 1966 to $27 million by 1993. Additionally, a number of new buildings were added to the campus during Demske's tenure, including the Churchill Academic Tower, the Demske Sports Complex, the former Health-Science Center, and the Koessler Athletic Center.

Demske retired as President of Canisius College in 1993 after 27 years in office. However, Demske remained at Canisius as chancellor from 1993 until his death in 1994. He was succeeded by Father Vincent Cooke, S.J.

Demske was an openly admitted enemy of Paul Snyder and the Buffalo Braves, believing the professional basketball team to be a threat to the Canisius basketball team's viability. In his capacity with Canisius, according to Snyder, Demske tried to block the Braves from getting viable dates to use Buffalo Memorial Auditorium, forcing the team to play part of its home schedule in Toronto and play much of the rest on off-prime days. Snyder later cited this feuding as the primary reason for his dismantling, sale and ultimate relocation of the Braves in the late 1970s.

Father James Demske died from complications of leukemia at Sisters of Charity Hospital in Buffalo, New York, on June 15, 1994, at the age of 72. He had first been diagnosed with leukemia in May 1992.
