= National Federation for Just Communities =

The National Federation for Just Communities is a coalition of social justice member organizations across the United States which work to overcome racism, bias, and discrimination. The coalition of was formed in 2006 after the dissolution of the National Conference for Community and Justice. Members meet annually at a conference hosted by one of NFJC's affiliate offices.

== See also ==
- Miami Coalition of Christians and Jews
- Virginia Center for Inclusive Communities
