= Queen City Landing =

Unbuilt skyscraper in Buffalo, New York

- Rendering of the tower
- Interactive map of the Queen City Landing area

General information
- Status: Never built
- Type: Mixed-use residential
- Location: Immediately northwest of Ohio Street and Furhmann Boulevard, Buffalo, New York
- Coordinates: 42.853176°N 78.867624°W
- Groundbreaking: April 17, 2017
- Estimated completion: undetermined
- Cost: $60 million-$85 million

Height
- Roof: 324 ft (99 m)

Technical details
- Floor count: 20

Design and construction
- Architect: Trautman Associates
- Developer: Gerald Buchheit
- Main contractor: R&P Oak Hill

References
- www.queencitylanding.com

Queen City Landing was an approved residential tower proposal by developer Gerald Buchheit on the Outer Harbor of Buffalo, New York. Preparation work included the demolition of a 6-story warehouse formerly operated by Freezer Queen Foods and the project was planned to have approximately 200 apartment units. Upon completion, it would have been the 6th-tallest building in Buffalo and the 13th-tallest in Upstate New York, with a height of 324 feet and 23 floors.

The tower was targeted in a lawsuit by local environmentalists out of concern that it posed a danger to bird migration, given its proximity to the Tifft Nature Preserve, and how the city board did not conduct a full environmental study on the site. However, on many occasions, a state Supreme Court judge upheld the city board's decision to build the tower and also ruled that the city acted properly in its environmental study. Bucheit completed the environmental cleanup of the site in late 2018.

On November 18, 2019, Bucheit announced a slight change in the tower's design. The building would be reduced to 20 stories and would be moved further away from the water, in addition to occupying 30 percent less land. The new finish date was tentatively projected to 2021. In addition, Bucheit also added plans for a surrounding neighborhood around the main tower complete with two 6-story apartment buildings, a cluster of 3-story townhouses, and more public space. However, in light of the COVID-19 pandemic, continued resistance from the plaintiffs, and an inability to secure public funding from the city, the project was "suspended indefinitely" in March 2020 and presumably canceled for good the following year when the developer listed the property for sale.

== See also ==
- List of tallest buildings in Buffalo, New York
