= Stephen Spiro =

American activist (1939–2007)

Stephen Joseph Spiro
- Born: 1939; The Bronx, New York, U.S.
- Died: October 23, 2007 (aged 67–68)
- Education: Fairleigh Dickinson University
- Occupation: Computer programmer
- Known for: Opposition to Vietnam War, consistent life ethic

Stephen Spiro (1939–2007) was a political activist known for his opposition against the Vietnam War and his advocacy of an ideology that opposes abortion, capital punishment, assisted suicide, and euthanasia. Opposing the Vietnam war based on the theory of Just War, he objected to being conscripted, but as the law only allowed for conscientious objection to all wars, he was convicted of avoiding conscription and given a suspended sentence of five years. He was later pardoned by President Gerald Ford.

== Early life ==
Born in the Bronx, Spiro attended Xavier High School in Manhattan. He attended the University of Chicago and later received bachelor's and master's degrees in economics from Fairleigh Dickinson University. While at the University of Chicago, his studies in economics and politics led him to become suspicious of government in all its forms. He joined the Student Peace Union and studied Catholic peace traditions, eventually becoming active in the Catholic Worker movement. He later described himself as a "Biblical anarchist and a radical pacifist."

== Opposition to war ==
Spiro opposed the Vietnam War as not conforming to the Catholic theory of just war. As the conscription laws in the United States allowed for conscientious objection only on the grounds of opposition to all war, Spiro was labeled a "selective conscientious objector" and was convicted of avoiding the draft. His case was championed by the newly formed Catholic Peace Fellowship; Daniel Berrigan, Tom Cornell, and Thomas Merton all lobbied on his behalf. The sincerity of his beliefs were recognized, as he received a five-year suspended sentence for his actions, and he was later pardoned by President Gerald Ford. He was "more proud of the conviction than the pardon" and throughout his life he referred to himself as a "political criminal."

Spiro also opposed the Gulf War and the Iraq War. In the last years of his life, he was the President of the New Jersey Catholic Peace Fellowship and he often engaged in counter-recruitment, setting up information tables in front of military recruiting offices in New Jersey.

== Anti-abortion movement ==
Spiro was active in the Right to Life movement. He regularly attended the March for Life and met with legislators. He advocated a consistent life ethic, also known as the seamless garment argument. This argument states that the right to life leads to opposition to abortion, capital punishment and war as a single consistent moral position. He would often bring anti-war signs to anti-abortion rallies (and vice versa), sparking arguments with his fellow protesters.
