= Jack Ziegler =

American cartoonist

John Denmore "Jack" Ziegler Jr. (July 13, 1942 - March 29, 2017) was an American cartoonist who contributed more than 1,600 cartoons to The New Yorker magazine over the course of his career.

== Early life ==
Jack Ziegler Jr. grew up in Forest Hills, Queens. His father sold pigment for a paint company, and his mother, the former Kathleen Clarke, was a homemaker. He graduated from Xavier High School and obtained a bachelor's degree in communication arts from Fordham University.

By 1974 he was selling cartoons to the National Lampoon, The Saturday Evening Post, Writer's Digest and men's magazines, and eventually, to The New Yorker.

== Legacy ==
Ziegler was considered one of the most transformative cartoonists in the history of The New Yorker, widely credited with bridging the gap between the "old school" sophisticated drawing room humor and the surreal, pop-culture-obsessed absurdity of modern comedy.

While New Yorker cartoons had often relied on witty dialogue between socialites, Ziegler found endless comedy in the mundane artifacts of American consumerism, for example hamburgers and toasters. He would place a suburban dad in a situation involving Norse gods or classic film noir tropes without any explanation, a precursor to the "random" humor of The Far Side. He helped popularize the "vibe" cartoon, where the humor came from the sheer weirdness of the situation rather than a traditional setup-and-delivery.

Ziegler's arrival in 1974 broke a "dry spell" at The New Yorker magazine and paved the way for a new generation of cartoonists. Gary Larson himself cited Ziegler as a major influence on his brand of skewed logic.

In 2016 he donated his archives to the Ohio State University Libraries’ Billy Ireland Cartoon Library & Museum. He died in 2017 in Kansas City.
