= John H. O'Rourke =

Rev. John H. O'Rourke S.J. (1856-1929) was a noted Jesuit priest, Master of novices, Retreat master, author and speaker.

== Early life ==
Rev. John H. O'Rourke, SJ was born in Newark, NJ on September 14, 1856, the son of Irish immigrants Thomas and Rosanna O'Rourke. John was the nephew of a famous architect Jeremiah O'Rourke.

== Jesuit Years ==
John studied at Fordham university New York and entered the Society of Jesus on July 23, 1874. He was ordained a priest at Woodstock College in Maryland in 1888. He was Master of Novices of the Novitiate at Frederick, Maryland during the years 1890-1904 and led the transfer of the Novitiate to St. Andrew-on-Hudson, Hyde Park, New York, in 1903.

In 1904 he began a career as a Retreat Master, leading over a hundred religious retreats across the United States. He was editor of the "Messenger of the Sacred Heart" (Jesuit periodical) for most of the period 1907–1917.

Father O'Rourke authored several religious books published by Apostleship of Prayer in New York:

- 1909 Under the sanctuary lamp: The hills that Jesus loved; Reflections for the holy hour
- 1912 The Fountains of the Savior; Reflections for the Holy Hour
- 1914 On the Hills With Our Lord
- 1916 On Israel's Hills. Reflections for the Holy Hour
- 1917 Journeys With Our Lord; Reflections for the Holy Hour
- 1921 The Mountains of Myrrh; Reflections on the Sacred Passion

== Death ==
Rev. O'Rourke died at St. Vincent's hospital in Manhattan on November 21, 1929, and is buried at the Jesuit cemetery at the former St-Andrew-on-Hudson Novitiate (now a Culinary Institute of America). The library at Woodstock College was constructed with donations from Mr. and Mrs. Francis P. Garvan and named in memory of Father John H. O'Rourke.

A book about John H. O'Rourke's life entitled "A Moulder of Men" was written by W. Coleman Nevils, S.J. and published in 1953, Apostleship of Prayer, New York.
