= John Larkin (Jesuit) =

19th-century Jesuit priest and educationist

John Larkin SJ
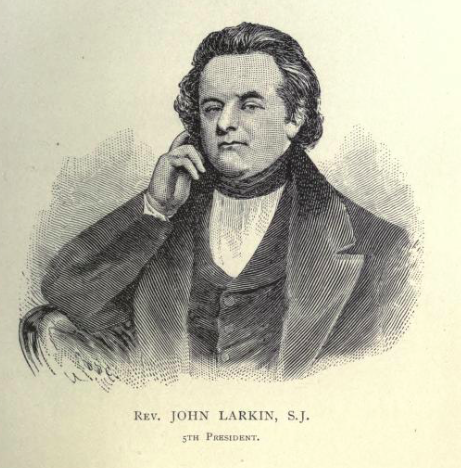
- Born: February 2, 1801; Ravensworth, England
- Died: December 11, 1858 (aged 57); New York City, United States of America
- Known for: Founder of Xavier High School; Sixth President of Fordham University

John Larkin SJ (1801–1858) was a Jesuit priest, born in England, who settled in New York City. There he founded the College of St. Francis Xavier (now Xavier High School) and became president of St John's College (now Fordham University).

== Earlier life ==
John Larkin was born in County Durham, England in 1801. He focused on classical studies at Ushaw College of the University of Durham. After his studies at Ushaw, he joined the navy and briefly traveled to Hindostan before returning to England to work at firms in Newcastle and London. In 1823 he began studying theology in Paris at the St. Sulpice seminary. He became an ordained priest in 1826 and was sent to Montreal to teach philosophy. He was appointed Coadjutor Bishop of Kingston, Ontario in 1832, but this did not take effect. It was in Montreal that Larkin joined the Society of Jesuits in 1841, and in 1846 he journeyed to New York City with 50 cents in his pocket.

== College of St. Francis Xavier ==
In 1847, with only five cents remaining from his travels, Larkin founded the College of St. Francis Xavier, now Xavier High School. With his five cents he was able to purchase a former Protestant church at the crossroads of Elizabeth and Walker streets. However, in 1848 a devastating fire destroyed the property. In 1851 a new location was acquired on West Sixteenth Street. During the search for a new location, Larkin received the opportunity to become Bishop of Toronto, a position he declined.

== St. John's College ==
In 1851 Larkin returned to Fordham where he became the President of St. John's College (now Fordham University), and for the next three years he "exerted such an extraordinary influence over pupils of all ages as he exercised—an influence that did not cease with the college life, but made itself felt in after years and stamped the future career of many of the men who were disciplined by him as boys."

Larkin did encounter issues during his presidency; in particular, there were repercussions when he cancelled the St. Patrick's Day holiday, and then there were threats from the Know Nothings. When Larkin's administration cancelled the holiday, Irish students brought cheap marbles and destroyed a majority of the college's windows. The Know Nothings were a group determined to fight the growing influence of German and Irish Catholic immigrants in America. After the fallout from St. Patrick's day, two meetings on Fordham Heights were held by the Know Nothings to plot setting fire to St. John's. However, a blacksmith, Mr. Cole, was aware of these meetings and threatened to expose the group if they continued with their plans. The Know Nothings ceased planning their attempt to burn down the college, but the government decided to provide the college with twelve muskets for protection.

== Legacy ==
After he left Fordham in 1854, he was summoned to England, Ireland, and eventually back to New York. Larkin died on December 11, 1858, at Fordham. Larkin Hall, a 27,000-square-foot science building located on the Rose Hill campus, is named after him.
