= Paul Snyder (basketball) =

American businessman (1931–2026)

Paul Lewis Snyder II (October 5, 1931 – August 10, 2026) was an American businessman in Buffalo, New York, who was the owner of the Buffalo Braves of the National Basketball Association (NBA).

== Life and career ==
Snyder was born on October 5, 1931 in Mansfield, Pennsylvania, where he was also raised. He first attended Alfred University before transferring to the University at Buffalo. Snyder was on the football and wrestling teams in college.

He founded the Freezer Queen frozen food company in Buffalo in 1958 and founded the Darien Lake theme park after purchasing 500 acres (2.0 km^{2}) of land in Genesee County, New York, in 1964, owning the resort and slowly developing it into a major amusement park until he sold the resort in 1983. He also briefly operated a (now demolished) Industrial Park located on the southeastern grounds of the Buffalo Niagara International Airport in the late 1980s.

In 1971, Snyder purchased the Buffalo Braves, which was an expansion team in the 1970–1971 NBA season, from the original hedge fund managers who had secured the expansion franchise. He sold the team in 1977, unable to compete with the much more successful Buffalo Sabres, who also debuted in the National Hockey League in 1970, or with the local college basketball teams, who were largely hostile toward professional basketball in Buffalo and managed to prevent Snyder from securing home games at the Buffalo Memorial Auditorium. The franchise later moved to San Diego (in a complicated swap with the Boston Celtics), then to Los Angeles, where it plays as the Los Angeles Clippers.

Snyder owned the Buffalo Hyatt Regency in the 1990s, partnering with the Sabres' then-president Larry Quinn on the venture, and opened the renowned E.B. Green's Steakhouse within the hotel.

Snyder died on August 10, 2026, at the age of 94. Among his children were his successor at most of his business operations, Paul Snyder III; and Janet Snyder, who was a prominent radio personality in Buffalo, most enduringly at WKSE.

Sporting positions
New creation	Buffalo Braves principal owner 1970–1977	Succeeded by John Y. Brown Jr.
