= Virginia Center for Inclusive Communities =

Non-profit organization

The Virginia Center for Inclusive Communities (VCIC) is a non-profit organization that works to reduce prejudice in schools, businesses, and communities. Its activities include workshops, retreats, and customized training and education programs. VCIC also trains leaders to promote inclusion. VCIC's programs and services have been recognized by local and national organizations.

The Virginia Center for Inclusive Communities has four chapters, based in Lynchburg, Peninsula, Richmond, and Tidewater (South Hampton Roads).

== History ==
VCIC was established in Lynchburg in 1935, when the President of Lynchburg College convened a number of Catholic, Protestant, and Jewish leaders to develop an Interfaith educational program. The group called itself the Lynchburg Round Table and organized an Interfaith Conference, held on November 25, 1935, in the gymnasium at Lynchburg College with just under 1,000 attendees, including clergy and lay leaders from other Virginia communities. According to contemporary news coverage, the conference featured an informal discussion among a rabbi, a priest, and a Protestant minister followed by an endorsement from U.S. Senator Carter Glass of Lynchburg.

Chapters of the movement were subsequently founded in Richmond and Norfolk, and by 1946, those chapters were affiliated with the National Conference of Christians and Jews (NCCJ), cooperating as part of the Virginia Region of the NCCJ. New chapters were subsequently established in Martinsville, Harrisonburg, Roanoke, the Peninsula, Petersburg, and Suffolk. The Lynchburg Round Table also affiliated with the NCCJ Virginia Region in 1948.

In the early 1990s, the organization changed its name to the National Conference, retaining the inititals NCCJ. In 1998, the organization re-launched as the National Conference for Community and Justice, to honor the history of the National Conference of Christians and Jews, while reflecting expansion of the organization's work to encompass additional religious groups, as well other contemporary human relations issues.

In 2005, local NCCJ offices across the United States, including the Virginia Region, became independent not-for-profit corporations. During this period of transition, the local organization became known as the Virginia Conference for Community and Justice. In 2007, the organization relaunched as the Virginia Center for Inclusive Communities.

Since 2009, the organization's president and CEO has been Jonathan C. Zur, who has been a recipient of the FBI Director's Community Leadership Award.
