= Freezer Queen =

Defunct frozen food company in Buffalo, New York

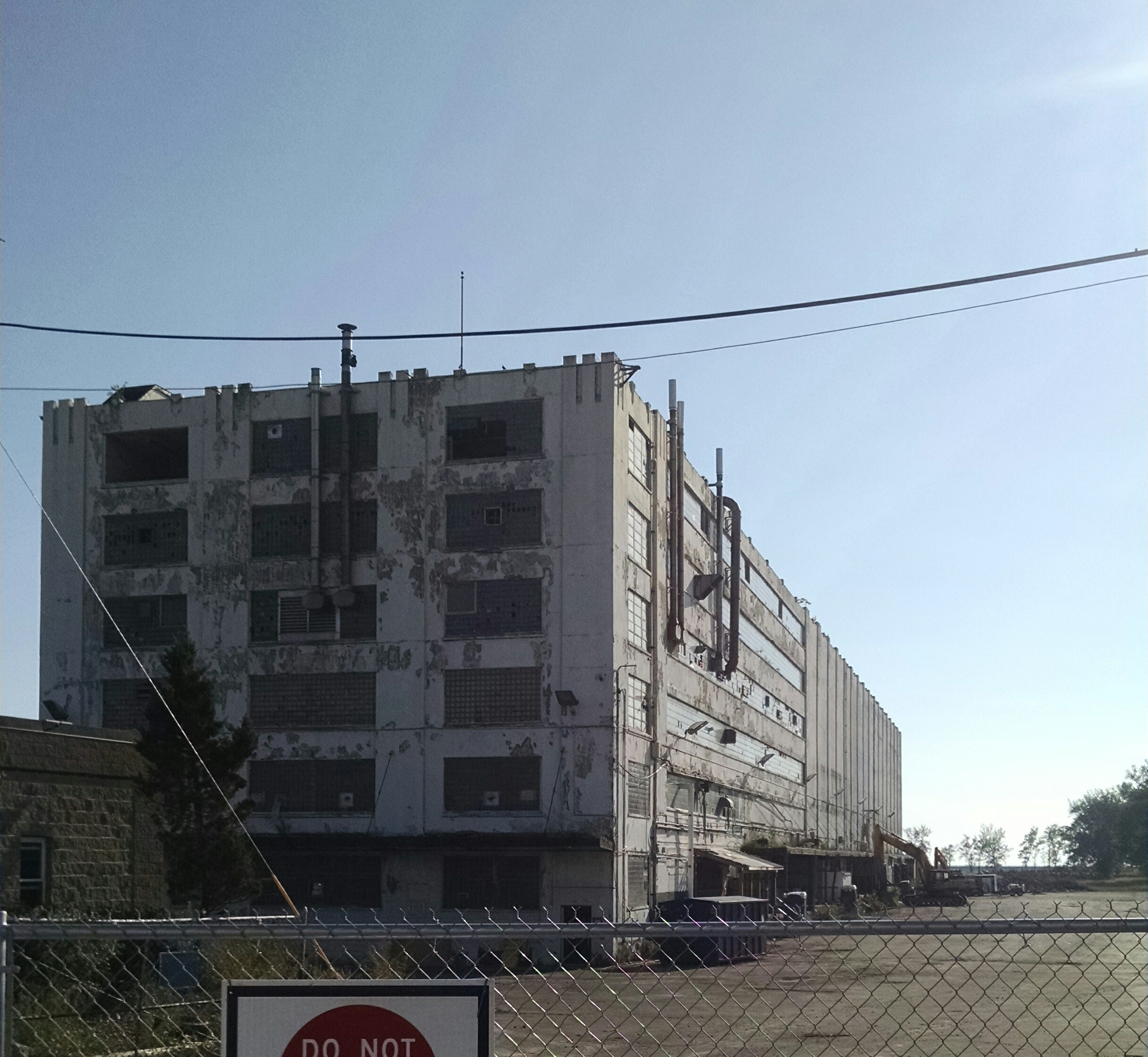
- Freezer Queen building
- Type: Public
- Industry: Food
- Products: Frozen food

Freezer Queen was an American frozen food packaging company. It was a pioneer of the TV dinner industry beginning in 1958. For many years, it was an important employer in Buffalo, New York. It was founded by Buffalo businessmen Paul Snyder and Charles R. Spalla, and at one point had over 1,000 employees. In 2006, its Buffalo plant failed a government safety inspection and was closed by Home Market Foods, its corporate parent. The company was previously owned by United Foods.

The plant's closure left many employees unemployed. The USDA inspection found such violations as live cockroaches in the gravy tank on multiple occasions. In response, Freezer Queen first requested a new USDA inspector, then suggested that parts of the facility were debris-strewn and not normally cleaned, and finally elected to shut down the facility rather than fix the unsafe and unsanitary conditions.

In its final years, Freezer Queen was merely a brand entity for the line of frozen dinners and entrees it had previously produced. Among those Freezer Queen-branded products were "Gravy with Salisbury Steaks," and "Broccoli with Cheese Sauce." Home Market Foods then transitioned the brand to "Family Buffet," ending Freezer Queen's history.

The former warehouse and production facility at 975 Fuhrmann Boulevard in Buffalo was demolished in anticipation of the construction of Queen City Landing, a 23-story apartment tower.
