= Woodstock Theological Center =

Catholic theological research institute in Washington, D.C.

The Woodstock Theological Center (1973–2013) was an independent, nonprofit Catholic theological research institute in Washington, D.C.

== History ==
Founded in 1973, the center took its name from Woodstock College, a former Jesuit seminary located in Maryland. The center was an associate member of the Washington Theological Consortium. Until it closed, the center was housed at Georgetown University.

In February 2013, the center announced that it was scheduled to close on June 30, 2013, citing a lack of Jesuit staff as a reason. On July 1, 2013, the Board of Trustees announced the center would no longer be an independent ministry, but that the library would be maintained as the Woodstock Theological Library, a part of the Georgetown University Library.
