= Xavier High School (New York City) =

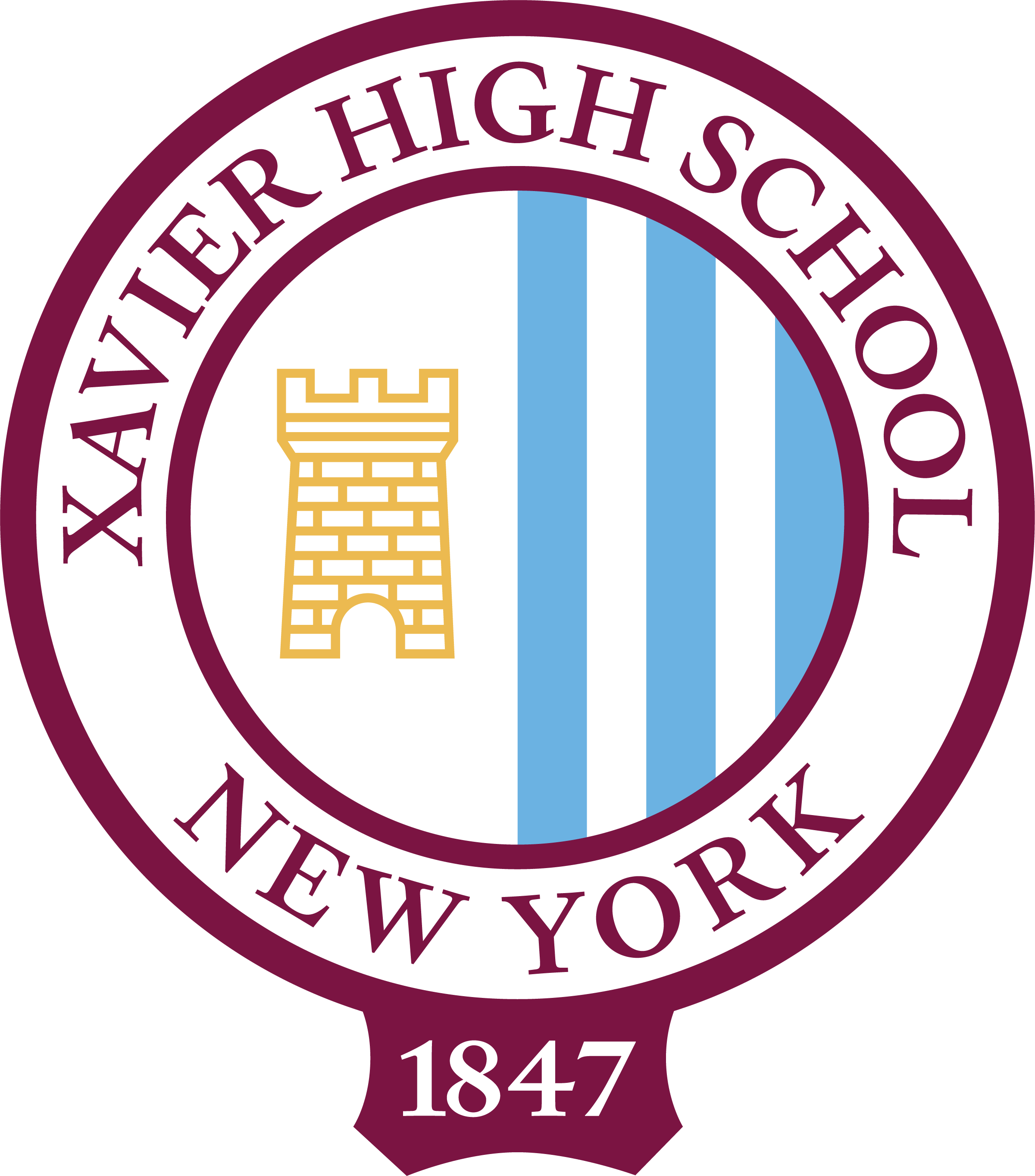

Location
- 30 West 16th Street; New York City, New York 10011; United States; 40°44′17″N 73°59′42″W

Information
- Former name: College of St. Francis Xavier (also known as St. Francis Xavier College)
- Type: Private
- Motto: "Ad Majorem Dei Gloriam" (Latin) "For the Greater Glory of God"
- Religious affiliation: Roman Catholic (Jesuit)
- Patron saint: St. Francis Xavier
- Established: 1847 (179 years ago)
- Founder: John Larkin
- Sister school: Notre Dame School
- Oversight: Society of Jesus
- CEEB code: 334145
- President: Jack Raslowsky
- Chairman: Paul Enright
- Headmaster: Edward Young
- Faculty: 67.5 (on an FTE basis)
- Grades: 9–12
- Gender: Boys
- Enrollment: 924 (2023–24)
- Student to teacher ratio: 13.7
- Campus type: Urban
- Colors: Maroon and blue
- Slogan: "Men for Others"
- Song: "Sons of Xavier"
- Athletics: 20 sports
- Athletics conference: Catholic High School Athletic Association, New York section
- Nickname: Knights
- Rivals: Fordham Preparatory School Regis High School
- Accreditation: Middle States Association of Colleges and Schools
- Publication: Xavier Magazine
- Newspaper: The Xavier Review
- Affiliations: Jesuit Secondary Education Association, National Catholic Educational Association, New York State Association of Independent Schools
- Website: xavierhs.org
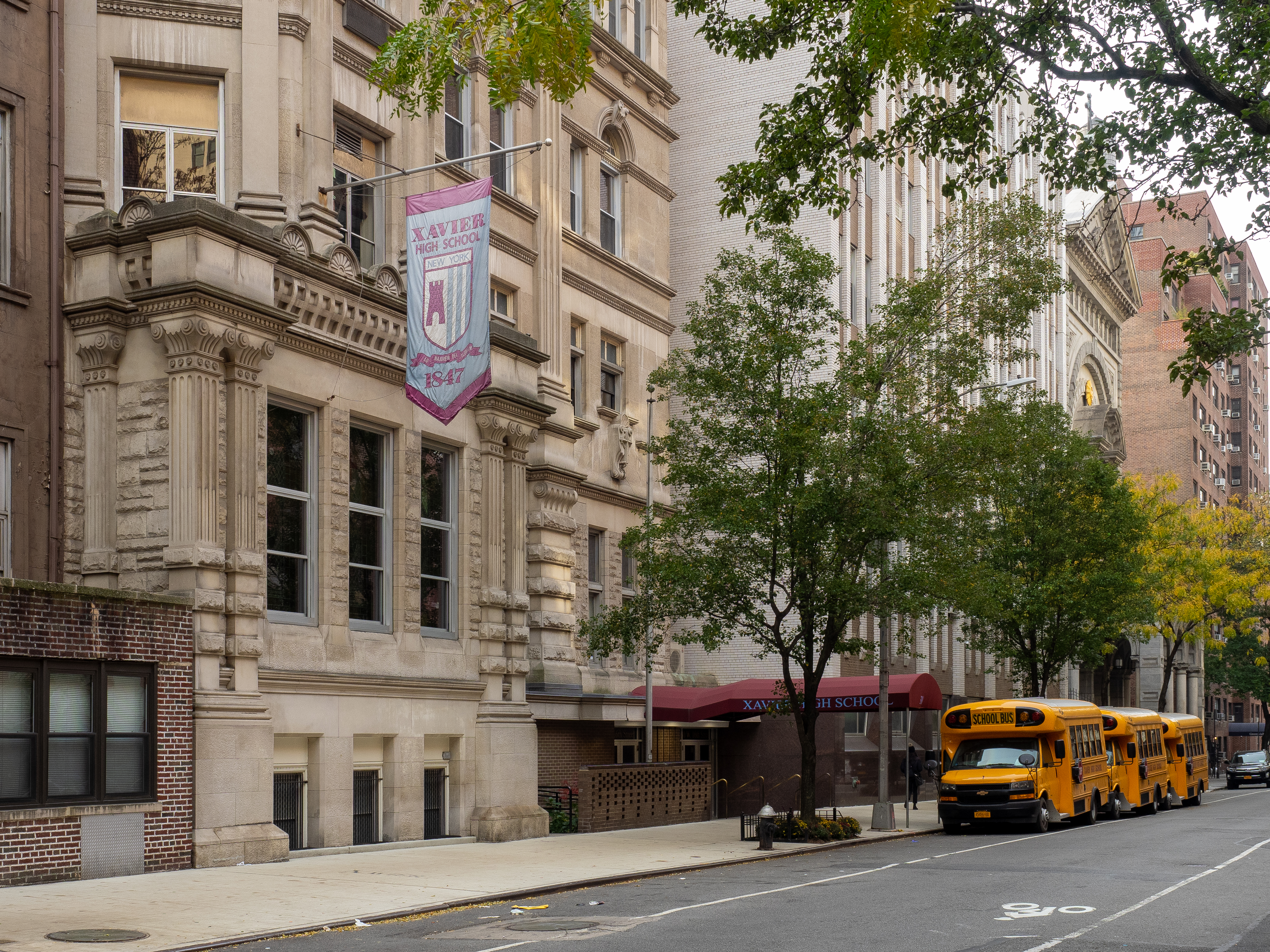
- Xavier High School in 2019

Xavier High School is an American independent university-preparatory high school for boys run by the USA East Province of the Society of Jesus, in the Chelsea neighborhood of the Manhattan borough of New York City, New York.

Named for St. Francis Xavier (1506–1552), it was founded by John Larkin in 1847 as the College of St. Francis Xavier and also known as St. Francis Xavier College.

== History ==
The school was founded in 1847 by John Larkin, a professor at St. John's College in Rosehill Manor, then in Westchester County, now a part of the Borough of the Bronx, and which later became Fordham University. It taught boys from the age of eight to twenty-one. The Regents of the University of the State of New York chartered Xavier in 1861.

A military-training unit began at the school in 1886 under the direction of the National Guard, and membership became mandatory in 1892. Five years later, collegiate and secondary studies were separated into different departments, and the college-level department was closed in 1912. The student regiment became a Junior ROTC unit in 1935, and the school was declared a military institute in 1968, offering four years of military science and training which would be recognized upon enrollment in any branch of the United States military. Participation in military studies was declared optional in 1971.

The school has been accredited by the Middle States Association of Colleges and Schools since 1927.

In 2008, Xavier High School announced that then President Daniel James Gatti would be retiring. Gatti's retirement was pushed back until the end of the 2009 school year. He was succeeded by Hoboken School Superintendent, Jack Raslowsky, the school's 33rd president and the first time in history that the position would be held by a lay person. Upon ascending to the role, Raslowsky oversaw a development operation that leading to a significant physical expansion of the Xavier High School campus.

In March 2021, Xavier High School announced that following a nationwide search, Kim Smith, vice president of Boston College High School, was chosen to take over as headmaster starting July 1. Smith, who would be replacing Headmaster Michael LiVigni, was to become the first female headmaster in the over 170-year history of the school. Before the 2026-2027 school year, Headmaster Kim Smith ceased being headmaster. Long time teacher, Edward Young, was selected as Interim Headmaster.

== Demographics ==
As of 2023–24, the school had an enrollment of 924 students, with 67.5 classroom teachers (on an FTE basis), for a student–teacher ratio of 13.7:1.

The school's student body was 57.6% White, 16.2% Hispanic, 8.0% Asian, 6.7% Black, 0.1% American Indian or Alaska Native, and 11.4% two or more races.

== Academics ==
The school offers courses under the categories of religion, English, history, modern and classical languages, mathematics, science, fine arts, computer science and technology, military science, health and physical education, and a guidance department program.

Xavier's courses prepare students to embrace the five goals of the Profile of a Graduate of a Jesuit School at Graduation (the "Grad at Grad"). These goals—being open to growth, intellectually competent, religious, loving, and committed to doing justice—are the foundation of Xavier's curriculum and prepare students to live a life of competence, conscience, and compassion.

== Athletics ==
Xavier, a Catholic High School Athletic Association (CHSAA) member, houses teams including baseball, basketball, bowling, cross-country, football, fencing, golf, hockey, indoor/outdoor track and field, rugby, soccer, lacrosse, swimming and diving, tennis, volleyball, and wrestling. Other extracurricular activities include boxing club, choir, speech and debate, chess team, anime, film, science fiction, and skiing /snowboard clubs, school newspaper, The Review, drama productions, UNICEF Club, and the Blue Knight Jazz Band. The Blue Knight Band won best trombone section at the 2010 Villanova University Big Band Festival.

Xavier's current mascot is a knight, and all of its athletic teams are referred to as the Knights. However, for many years, the teams were called the Cadets, a reflection of Xavier's military program, while a terrier was used as a mascot. After a variety of replacements, including the 1980s Bruins, the nickname of the Knights was decided upon in the early 1990s and has been official since.

=== Football ===
The Xavier Football program began in the late 19th century. It has a continued rivalry with the Bronx's Fordham Preparatory School. The two schools compete in an annual "Turkey Bowl", the oldest high school football rivalry in New York City. Their very first game against one another took place in the late 19th century when the game was called off due to darkness, ending in a tie. Many of these football matches were played at Manhattan's famed Polo Grounds, until its demolition.

=== Rugby ===
Rugby is a popular sport at Xavier. Rugby has varsity status, and fields four teams with over 125 players. Xavier has fielded one of the top rugby teams in the United States since the club's founding in 1976.

=== Track ===
The Freshman Track and Field team won the indoor and outdoor 2009 CHSAA Intersectional Championships, the first time in team history. In 2010, the team defended their outdoor victory as sophomores. The Track and Field team competed in the Nationals track meet in Greensboro, North Carolina and finished fifth in both the 4 by 100 and 4 by 200 meter relay, earning Emerging Elite Metals. In 2024, the team made history as the first NYC-based team to qualify for the Nike Cross Nationals (NXN), an invitational high school cross country race in Portland, Oregon. The Knights secured their spot after a second-place finish at the New York State Federation meet and winning the 2024 Catholic League championship.

=== Other sports ===
In 1859 the College of St. Francis Xavier and St. John's College (now Fordham University) played the first collegiate level baseball game, featuring the new nine-man team style of play. Fordham won the game 33–11.

Xavier High School's JV Soccer team won the CHSAA Intersectional Championship in 2008 and 2009.

== Buildings ==
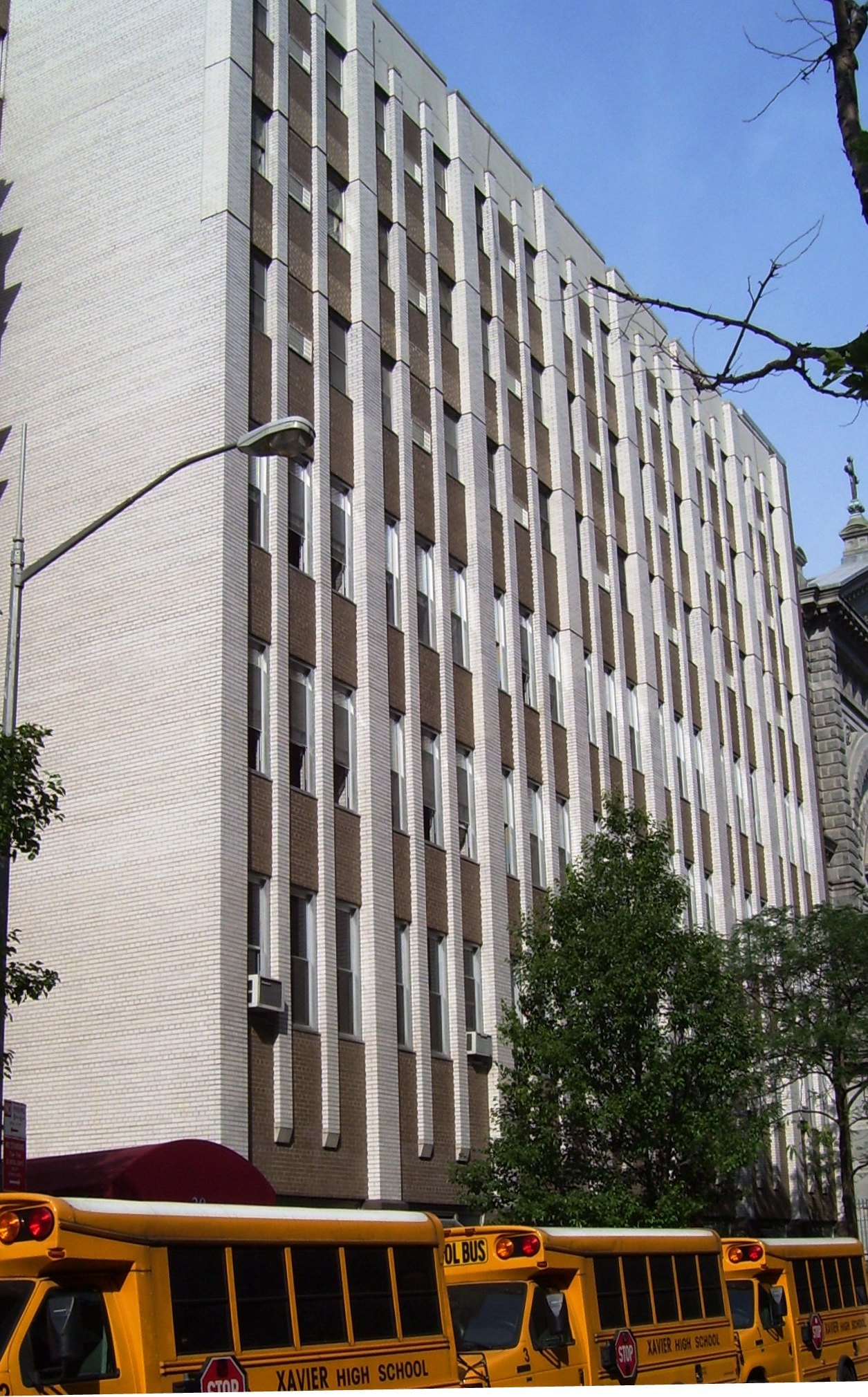
This wing, known colloquially as the "K" building, was built in 1965 and currently houses a gymnasium, library, and computer lab, along with several dedicated science classrooms.

In 2016, the school acquired space inside a 25-story building, 35 West 15th Street, to house Fernandez-Duminuco Hall, occupying 45,000 square feet (4,200 m^{2}) of space in the basement and six floors. The other floors house condominiums, and both the school campus and the condominiums have separate entrances.

The building has allowed for the expansion of the arts at Xavier. The expansion includes a new band room, music practice rooms, small ensemble room, recording studio, theater, and STEAM classroom, which houses an expanded computer science and technology department, and a student activities space.

== Notable people ==
Alumni

- Dave Anderson (1929–2018, class of 1947) – writer, The New York Times; author
- Vincent M. Battle, (b. 1940, class of 1958) – former United States Ambassador to Lebanon
- John D. Caemmerer (1928–1982, class of 1946) – lawyer; politician who served in the New York (Senate)
- Jerry Capeci – former organized crime reporter, New York Daily News; writer
- Charles J. Carroll (1882–1942, class of 1905) – lawyer; politician
- Arthur D. Cashin Jr. (Mar, 1941 - Dec, 2024, class of 1949) Floor manager NYSE, philanthropist
- John T. Clancy (1903–1985, class of 1921) – lawyer; politician; and surrogate judge from Queens
- Donald Cook (1934–1967, class of 1952) – colonel, U.S. Marine Corps; recipient, Medal of Honor
- Vincent Cooke (1936–2017, class of 1954) – president, Canisius College (1993–2010)
- John R. Countryman (class of 1950) – United States Ambassador to Oman (1981–1985)
- William H. Crain – Congressman from Texas
- Brigadier General Ruben Cubero (b. 1939, class of 1957) – first Hispanic dean of the faculty, United States Air Force Academy
- Major General Anthony Cucolo (b. 1957, class of 1975) – 49th commandant, United States Army War College
- John M. Culkin (b. 1932, class of 1950) – media scholar and critic; educator; writer; and consultant
- Albert del Rosario (b. 1939, class of 1957) – Philippine Ambassador to the United States; Philippine Foreign Affairs Secretary
- Sylvester A. Dineen (1898–1950) – schoolteacher and politician
- Hugh Aloysius Drum – lieutenant-general, United States Army
- George Dzundza (b. 1945, class of 1963) – film and television actor (Law and Order)
- Brad Ferguson (b. 1953, class of 1970) – author; journalist
- Joseph F. Finnegan – director, Federal Mediation and Conciliation Service
- Douglas Fowley – film and television actor
- Michael Gargiulo (b. 1959, class of 1977) – Emmy Award-winning television personality (anchor, Today in New York)
- Sonny Grosso – film and television producer
- Ernest E. L. Hammer (1884–1970) – lawyer; politician; and judge
- Jerramiah Healy (b. 1950, class of 1968) – mayor, Jersey City, New Jersey
- George Kaftan (class of 1945) – basketball player, NBA and NCAA; recipient, 1947 MOP award
- Michael Keane (b. 1961, class of 1979) – Nuffield Professor of Economics, University of Oxford
- Seamus Kelly (b. 1991, class of 2009) – outside center, United States national rugby union team
- Robert Kibbee (died 1982) – chancellor, City University of New York
- Thomas A. Ledwith (class of 1856) – lawyer; politician, New York City, New York
- Dudley Field Malone – defense attorney, Scopes "Monkey" Trial; Collector of Customs, Port of New York (1913); Third Assistant Secretary of State, Woodrow Wilson Administration
- Joseph O. Mauborgne (class of 1901) – major general, U.S. Army; portrait artist; cryptanalyst; head, Signal Corps
- Cornelius Augustine McGlennon – representative for New Jersey's 8th congressional district; mayor, East Newark, New Jersey
- Frank McGuire (class of 1932) – Hall of Fame basketball coach; taught and coached the basketball team at Xavier for more than a decade
- Charles Messina (b. 1971, class of 1989) – playwright; director
- Michael Montelongo (class of 1973) – 19th Assistant Secretary of the Air Force (Financial Management & Comptroller)
- Neil Olshey (class of 1983) – general manager, Portland Trail Blazers
- Mario Pei (b. 1900, class of 1918) – linguist
- Edmund D. Pellegrino – former chair, President's Council on Bioethics
- Michael Petri (class of 2002) – United States national rugby union team
- Eugene A. Philbin – New York County District Attorney
- John Paul Pitoc (class of 1992) – actor
- Robert J. Reiley (1878–1961) – member, American Institute of Architects; architect of churches, schools, and hospitals in the Northeast
- Al Roker (class of 1972) – NBC television personality; entrepreneur
- Wilbur Ross (class of 1955) – United States Secretary of Commerce; investor known for restructuring failed companies
- Antonin Scalia (1953–2016) – associate justice, United States Supreme Court
- Dermot Shea (class of 1986) – commissioner, New York City Police Department (since 2019)
- Thomas F. Smith (1917–1921) – U.S. Congressman, State of New York
- Stephen Spiro (b. 1939, class of 1957) – Vietnam War opponent; conscientious objector
- Patrick Stokes (b. 1942, class of 1960) – president, Anheuser-Busch
- Steven Strait (class of 2004) – actor; fashion model; and singer
- Augustus Vincent Tack (class of 1890) – painter of portraits, landscapes and abstractions
- Mike Tolkin (class of 1985) – head coach, USA Rugby men's national team
- Lieutenant General John A. Toolan (class of 1972) – commander, Fleet Marine Force Pacific
- Robert Trehy (class of 1939) – opera singer
- Jimmy Walker – mayor, New York City
- Winand Wigger – Catholic prelate
- F. Paul Wilson – writer, Repairman Jack science-fiction series
- Jack Ziegler (b. 1942, class of 1960) – cartoonist, most notably for The New Yorker
- Gregory Barbaccia (class of 2002) - Federal Chief Information Officer of the United States

Faculty

- Rev. Francis P. Duffy – former chaplain, 69th Infantry Division (known as the "Fighting 69th"); teacher of French (1893), "Duffy Square – the northern half of New York City's Times Square between 45th and 47th Streets – is named in his honor".
- Leo Paquin (1910–1993) – 40-year faculty member who was athletic director, football coach, and English and Latin teacher; played end for Fordham University as part of the 1936 line known as the "Seven Blocks of Granite"
- Mike Petri (class of 2002) – rugby coach; physics and biology teacher
- Mike Tolkin (class of 1985) – varsity rugby coach; English teacher; left in 2012, after being asked to become the head coach of the USA Rugby team

== In popular culture ==
Xavier High School has been used in several television shows and movies, including:

- Scenes of The Peacemaker were filmed at Xavier.
- New Kids On The Block filmed the music video for their song "I'll Be Loving You (Forever)" at Xavier.
- Xavier was used as a police precinct for the film Premium Rush.
- A scene from The Winning Season was filmed in the main gymnasium.
- Matt Murdock, in the first episode of Daredevil: Born Again states that he went to Xavier High School.

== See also ==
- List of Jesuit sites
- List of Jesuit secondary schools in the United States
