= Anthony Maas =

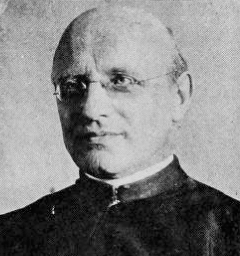
- Born: Anthony John Maas; August 23, 1858; Bainkhausen, Province of Westphalia, Prussia
- Died: February 20, 1927 (aged 68); Poughkeepsie, New York
- Burial place: Saint Andrew-on-Hudson
- Occupation: Writer

Anthony John Maas, S.J. (1859–1927) was a noted Catholic exegete, or writer of critical interpretation of scripture.

== Biography ==
Anthony Maas was born in Bainkhausen, Province of Westphalia, Prussia on August 23, 1858. He was educated at public and private schools and the gymnasium at Arnsberg, Westphalia, the Jesuit scholasticates at Manresa, New York, Woodstock College, and Manresa, Spain.

Maas came to the United States, entered the Society of Jesus in 1877, and was ordained, 1887. He was professor of Scripture (1891–1905) and prefect of studies (1897–1905) at Woodstock, assistant editor of The Messenger in New York (1905–1907), rector of Woodstock College (1907–1912), and provincial of the Maryland-New York Province, resident in New York (1912–1927).

His works include the Life of Christ, Christ in Type and Prophecy and a commentary on the Gospel according to Saint Matthew. He also contributed articles to the Catholic Encyclopedia, such as that on "Antichrist."

He died at Saint Andrew-on-Hudson, Poughkeepsie, New York on February 20, 1927.
