= Woodstock College =

Jesuit seminary in Maryland (1869–1974)

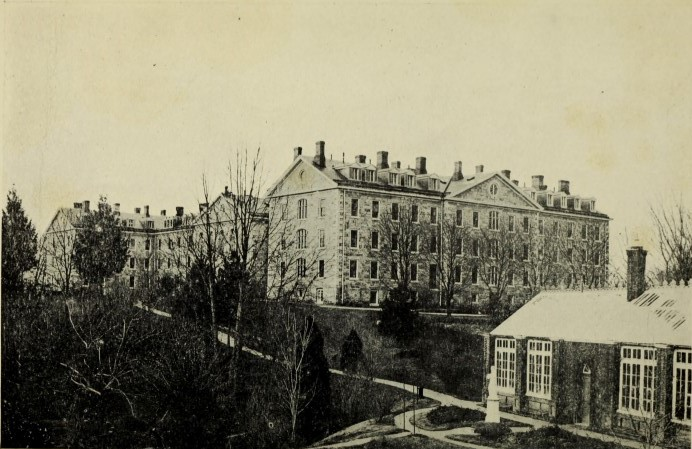
- Woodstock College, c. 1920
- Motto: Ad majorem Dei gloriam
- Type: Seminary
- Active: 1869–1974
- Affiliations: Jesuit
- Founder: Angelo Paresce
- Location: Woodstock, Maryland, U.S. 39°20′08″N 76°52′12″W

Woodstock College was a seminary that existed from 1869 to 1974. It was the oldest Jesuit seminary in the United States. The school was located in Woodstock, Maryland, west of Baltimore, from its establishment until 1969, when it moved to New York City, where it operated in cooperation with the Union Theological Seminary and the Jewish Theological Seminary.

The school closed in 1974. It was succeeded by the Woodstock Theological Center, an independent, nonprofit Catholic research institute located at Georgetown University in Washington, D.C.

== History ==
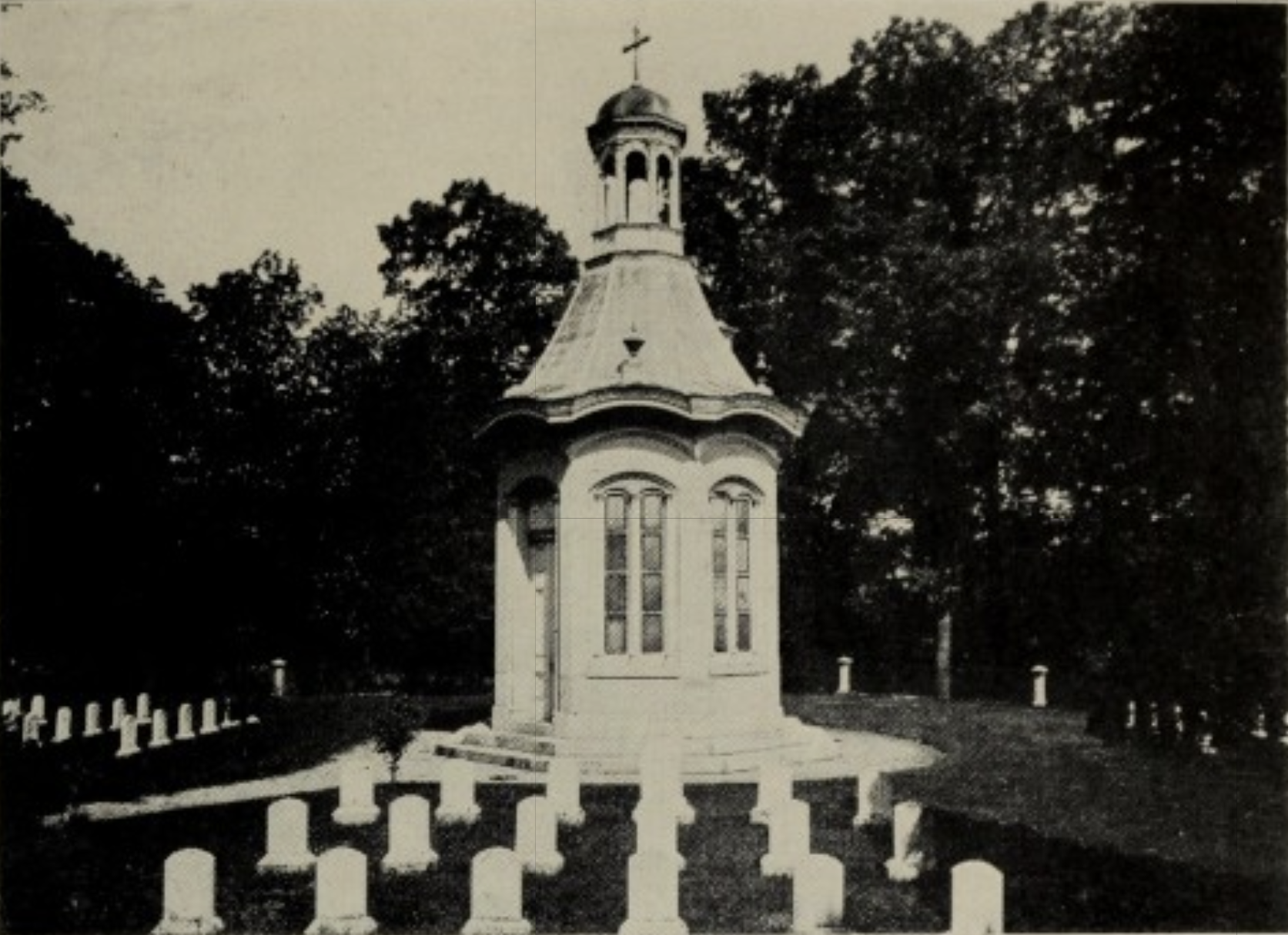
Cemetery and sepulchral chapel at the college

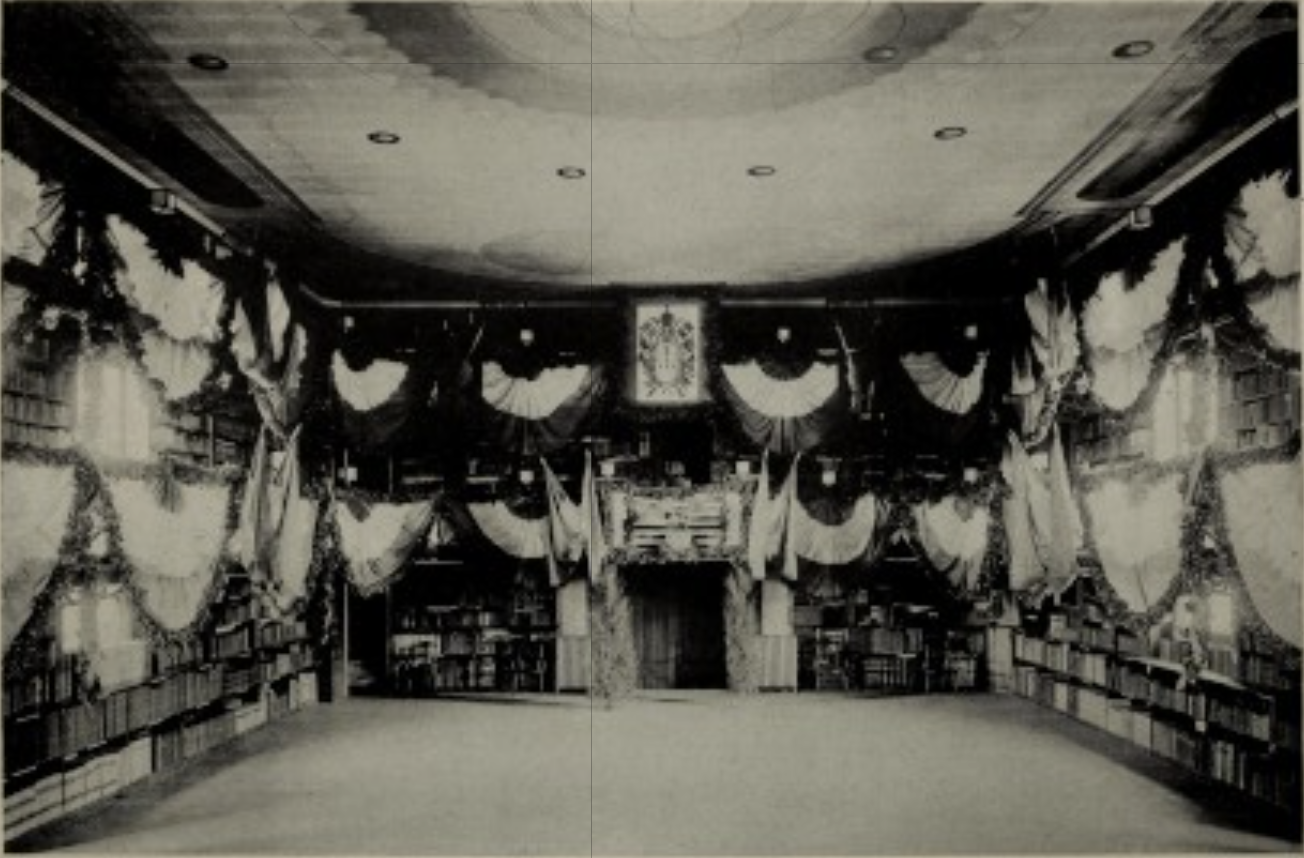
Library outfitted for the college's golden jubilee

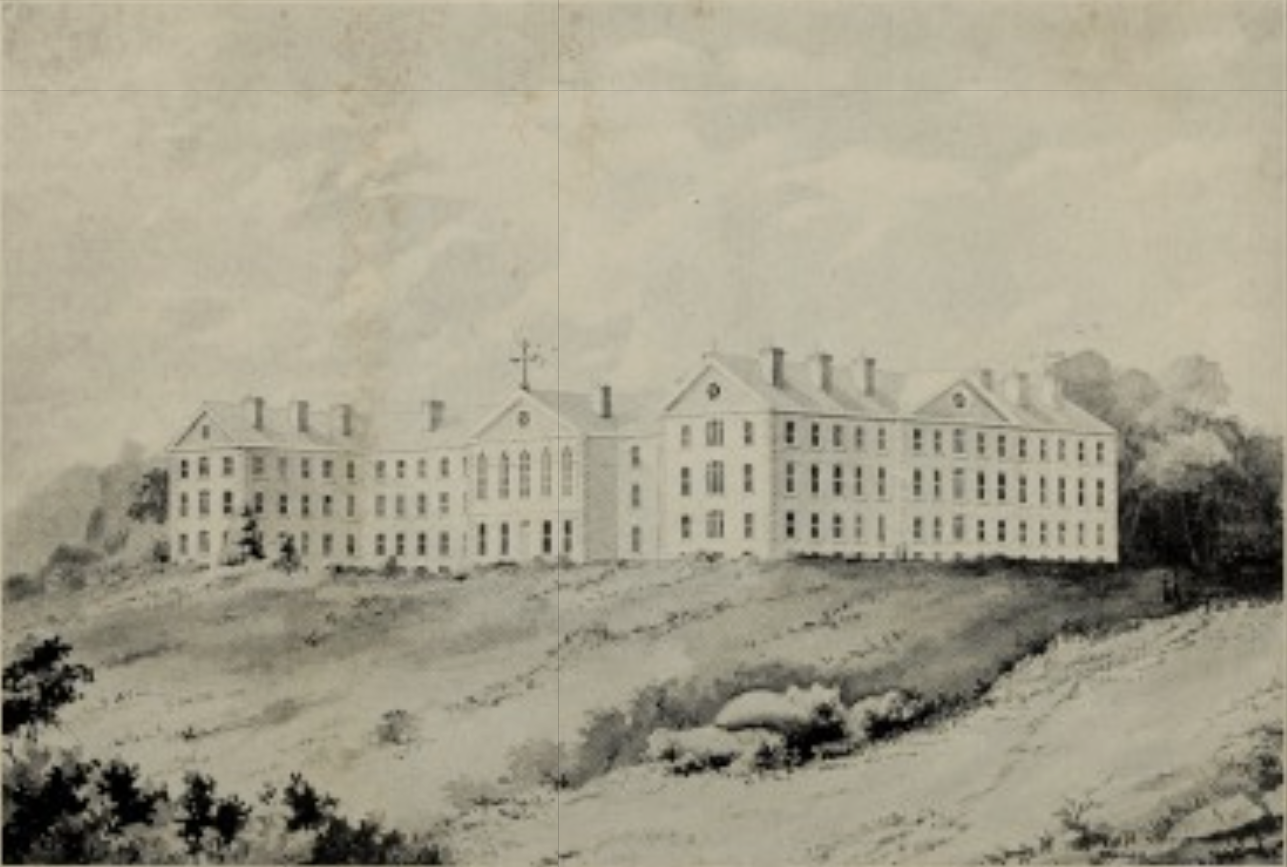
College building, c. 1871

After unsuccessful efforts to establish a divinity school in Boston, New York, and Washington D.C., 249 acres were purchased in Woodstock in 1866, where construction of Woodstock College soon followed. The college was originally located along the Patapsco River in Woodstock, Maryland, west of Baltimore. It incorporated in 1867, and opened on September 22, 1869. At the time, the college was the only Jesuit seminary in the United States and was intended to be where the majority of all American Jesuit priests would be trained in the future.

In the 1960s, the college began considering affiliating with an urban university.

The argument to move the school into a city and place it in affiliation with a broader network of institutions of higher learning received decisive support from the newest ideas of theological education and priestly formation emerging from the Second Vatican Council and the Jesuits' own Thirty-First General Congregation. New Haven, Washington D.C., and New York City were considered for the college's relocation. In consequence, the college closed its original campus and moved to New York City in 1969 where it operated in cooperation with the Union Theological Seminary and the Jewish Theological Seminary. Controversies over the merits of the move into the city, specific controversies arising over the lifestyle of the Jesuits in training in New York, and a general desire of the order to consolidate its theology schools nationally led to the school's closure in 1974.

It was succeeded until 2013 by the Woodstock Theological Center, an independent, nonprofit Catholic research institute located at Georgetown University in Washington, D.C. The theological library retains its independence through an affiliation with the library at Georgetown University, where it is still housed.

== Campus ==
The original campus buildings in Woodstock, Maryland are now used as a Job Corps Center, while the campus grounds are part of Patapsco Valley State Park.

== Rectors and presidents ==
No.	Name	Years	Ref.
1	Angelo Paresce SJ	1869–1875	
2	James Perron SJ	1875–1881	
3	Joseph E. Keller SJ	1881–1883	
4	Pierre O. Racicot SJ	1883–1890	
5	Edward V. Boursaud SJ	1890–1893	
6	Joseph Jerge SJ	1893–1897	
7	Burchard Villiger SJ	1897–1901	
8	William P. Brett SJ	1901–1907	
9	Anthony Maas SJ	1907–1912	
10	Joseph Hanselman SJ	1912–1918	
11	William Clark SJ	1918–1921	
12	Peter Lutz SJ	1921–1927	
13	Vincent McCormick SJ	1927–1933	
14	Francis Keenan SJ	1933–1939	
15	David Nugent SJ	1939–1945	
16	Ferdinand Wheeler SJ	1945–1951	
17	Joseph Murphy SJ	1951–1957	
18	Edward J. Sponga SJ	1957–1963	
19	Michael F. Maher SJ	1963–1965	
20	Felix Cardegna SJ	1965–1969	
21	Christopher F. Mooney SJ	1969–1974	

== Notable people ==
See List of people associated with Woodstock College

== See also ==
- List of Jesuit sites
