= Creighton Preparatory School =

Jesuit boys' high school in Omaha, Nebraska

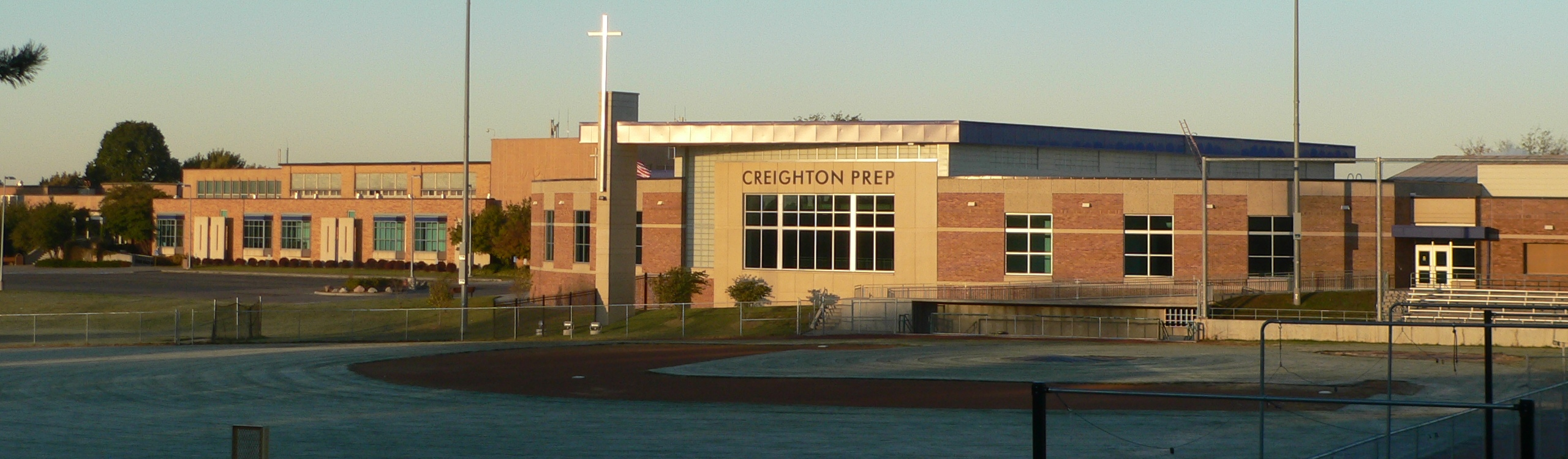

Location
- 7400 Western Avenue; Omaha, Nebraska 68114-1878; United States; 41°16′16″N 96°1′37″W

Information
- Other names: Creighton Prep; Prep
- Type: Private high school
- Motto: Latin: Ad Majorem Dei Gloriam (For the Greater Glory of God)
- Religious affiliation: Catholic (Jesuit)
- Established: 1878; 148 years ago
- Oversight: Archdiocese of Omaha
- NCES School ID: 02161678
- President: Fr. Matthew Spotts, SJ
- Head of school: Jacquelyn Schulte
- Teaching staff: 82.0 (on an FTE basis)
- Grades: 9–12
- Gender: Boys
- Enrollment: 975 (2021-2022)
- Student to teacher ratio: 11.9
- Colors: Blue and White
- Athletics conference: NSAA District A-1
- Mascot: Bluejay
- Nickname: Junior Jays
- Accreditation: AdvancED
- Affiliation: Jesuit Schools Network
- Website: www.creightonprep.creighton.edu

Creighton Preparatory School (simply referred to as Creighton Prep or Prep) is a private, Jesuit high school for boys in Omaha, Nebraska, United States. It was established in 1878 under the name Creighton College and is located in the Archdiocese of Omaha. Creighton College was founded by John A. Creighton and named after Edward Creighton, developer of the transcontinental telegraph line. It was founded from a $100,000 grant and donated to the Catholic Church, leading to its inception as a Jesuit institution. Creighton College separated into Creighton University and Creighton Preparatory School in 1958. Over the 142 years since its founding, Creighton Prep has grown from an initial class of 120 students to a student body of 1021 individuals (2016).

Creighton Prep holds a rivalry with Westside High School and is the recipient of nearly 200 individual State Championship and All State Championship titles. Creighton Prep has received the U.S. Department of Education Blue Ribbon Award for Academic Excellence and has its education programs are grounded in Jesuit Philosophies. Admittance is dependent on an annually held entrance exam. Creighton Prep was used as a site for the filming of Downsizing, a 2017 American science fiction comedy-drama film directed by Alexander Payne.

== History ==
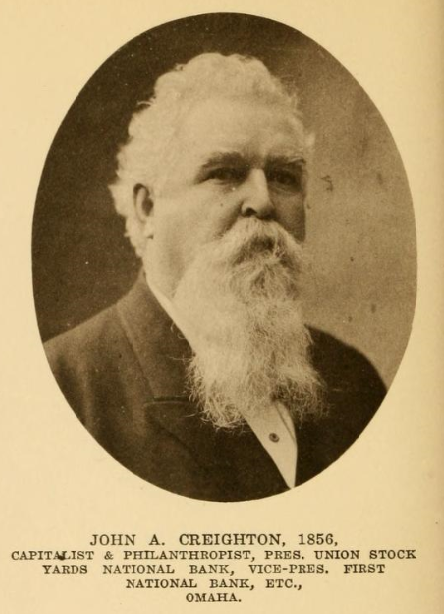
John A. Creighton, founder of Creighton College

=== 1878 ===
Creighton School was founded in 1878, later separating into Creighton Preparatory School and Creighton University. The school was named after Edward Creighton, an Omaha businessman, developer of the transcontinental telegraph line, and founder of Omaha and Northwestern Railroad who originally proposed the school but died prior to completing its proposal. After his death in 1874, his wife, Mary Lucretia, then began finishing the proposal but died in 1876, leaving the unfinished plans to her brother-in-law, John A. Creighton. In the will of Mary Lucretia, it was stated that there would be a $100,000 memorial for her late husband “to purchase the site for a school in the city of Omaha and erect buildings thereon for a school of the class and grade of a college.” John Creighton purchased 6.2 acres of land at the address of 24th and California streets in Omaha, NE. Construction of the initial building was completed during the summer of 1878 and the completed site was transferred to the ownership Right Reverend James O'Connor, Bishop of Omaha in July of that year. O'Connor then contacted the Society of Jesus (Jesuits) to operate the college and the university was transferred to their ownership in August 1879. Classes began on September 2, 1878 with five Jesuit priests serving as the Board of Trustees, two lay teachers, and an initial enrollment of 120 students.

=== 1953–1967 ===
From 1878 to 1958 Creighton Prep functioned as a department of Creighton University. In 1953, both organizations determined their functionality would be best served if they were to separate into two independent institutions. The initial plot of land for Creighton Preparatory School was purchased in 1953, fundraising for the school began in 1956, and construction was completed prior to the start of the 1958 fall term. Both Fr. Henry Sullivan, S.J and Fr. Carl Reinert, S.J. spearheaded the effort, raising $1.7 million for the construction of a 105,000 sq/ft school at its current 7400 Western Avenue location. Once completed, the school was officially given to the Society of Jesus, known more commonly as the Jesuits.

In 1958, upon completion of the main building, construction on the Jesuit residence began. The Jesuit residence was completed in 1961, after 3 years of construction. This 50,000 sq/ft building was designed to house 30 Jesuit priests, Scholastics, and Brothers who had been living prior in then-empty classrooms and two houses southwest of the main school building. The same year, a chapel for the Jesuit priests was constructed, later renovated into a school wide chapel, named Skinner Chapel.

In 1967, led by Fr. Daniel Kenney, Creighton Prep founded a student led service organization called "Operation Others" (simply referred to as "OO"), as a food box give-away program. This program encompassed 8 Omaha-area Catholic High schools and grew to annually serve approximately 1500 families.

=== 1970–1985 ===
Led by Mike Wilmot, S.J., volunteers and students constructed the "Tin Gym" in 1970. This provisional building was to serve as a secondary gym along the north side of the school. This gym served the purpose of hosting dances, informal sports games, and other student activities. This building was later demolished in 2009 to make way for the construction of the Heider Center gymnasium, and the wood floor was placed into long-term storage until being sold to St. Joan of Arc School in 2015. Creighton Prep was significantly damaged by an F4 tornado during the 1975 Omaha Tornado Outbreak, resulting in approximately $500,000 in damage and early termination of the school year. Clean-up efforts involved over 1500 individuals and surveys of the damage showed significant damage to the building's second floor. Final exams for the school were held in the "Tim Gym", with many believing that the school may need to be permanently closed due to its extensive damage. The school was repaired prior to the beginning of the fall term.

In 1985, Mike Wilmot, S.J. oversaw students, parents, and volunteers in the construction of the Creighton Prep weight room.

=== 1992–1999 ===
The 35,000 sq/ft Henry L. Sullivan, S.J. Campus Center was the largest structural change made to Creighton Prep since its construction. Completed in 1992, the multipurpose space was designed to host Catholic Masses, eating and study areas, and serve as a location for social events. This addition also included the construction of two additional centers, expanding the campus ministry and counseling offices. Lastly, updated class spaces for the Fine Arts Department were constructed adjacent to the Sullivan Center, expanding the art, architecture, and band programs at Creighton Prep.

In 1999, the 25,000 sq/ft Dr. James B. and Joan C. Peter Science Center completed construction. This addition included the construction of 5 classrooms/ laboratory rooms and renovation of 4 additional classrooms. Approximately 100,000 sq/ft of the east side of the school was renovated in addition to the construction. Large portions of the Jesuit residence were renovated and re-purposed to be used as classrooms and administration offices. Further renovations included the construction of the current main entrance, a 2000-person football stadium, and the addition of a wrestling room.

=== 2000–2009 ===
In 2001, Robert Hotz, S.J., president of Creighton Prep at the time, invited alumnus William Glenn (1962), a gay man, to address the faculty on his experiences of homosexuality in high school and how to better assist gay students. In 2003, President of Creighton Prep, Reverend Robert Hotz, S.J. resigned after inviting another openly gay alumnus, Don Fraynd (1990), to speak at school Mass on his experiences pertaining to religion, service, and homosexuality. The Advocate was critical of the resignation while Creighton Prep never listed an official reason for Hotz's resignation.

In celebrating the 50 year anniversary of the original completion of the campus, Creighton Prep began a $20 million construction project in 2008. This project was part of a $37 million capital campaign lasting from 2007 to 2013. This renovation project included the construction of a new gym (referred to as the Heider Center), baseball field, multipurpose artificial turf playing field, renovated classrooms, new auditorium (referred to as the Criss Auditorium), and new technology center. This construction project resulted in the demolition of the "Tin Gym", having been replaced by updated facilitates. Construction completed in 2009 and the gym was dedicated as the Heider Center on December 12, 2009. Additionally, 2009 marked the implementation of the house system named after influential Creighton Prep priests and each having their own mascot. The houses are as follows: Kanne (Terrapin), Neiman (Griffin), Hindelang (Labrador), Auer (Owl), and Laughlin (Razorback), named after: Fr. Charles Kanne SJ, Fr. Mark Neiman SJ, Fr. Michael Hindelang SJ, Fr. John Auer SJ, and Fr. Dan Laughlin SJ, respectively. Each house competes for the "House Cup" named after Fr. William O’Leary, SJ. These houses also served as a means to assign specific councilors to groups of students. This change was coupled with the addition of block scheduling and implementation of a "community period" in place of traditional study hall.

=== 2014–present ===
In 2014, Creighton Prep partnered with the City of Omaha Storm-Water Program to construct a bio retention garden near the front of the school. By partnering with student clubs: Creighton Prep Architecture Club, the Creighton Prep Junior Green Jays, and the Creighton Prep Science Club, the garden was constructed in 2014 with monitoring systems to determine the project's efficacy. This same year, construction of the Circo Memorial Plaza took place. This plaza dedicated Creighton Prep graduates that had died in World War I, World War II, Korean War, Vietnam War, 9/11, and Afghanistan War. Additionally, previous presidents, principals, Jesuit priests, and long time faculty (serving 15 years or more) were dedicated. During the 2015–2016 school year, Creighton Prep implemented a one-on-one IPad program in which students would be required to provide an IPad to their classes.

In 2016, Creighton Prep renovated the Henry L. Sullivan, S.J. Campus Center, reorganizing the space in order to accommodate a new catering service. Creighton Prep had previously relied on restaurant vendors and volunteer work in order to feed the student body but starting in fall of 2016, Creighton Prep contracted FLIK Independent School Dining to serve as the primary food provider. This also included an expansion of the before and after school food service, now providing breakfast and after school meals. The transition to professional dining services came from concerns over lack of nutritional value and inadequate accommodation of food allergies and dietary restrictions. FLIK Independent School Dining services were specifically selected due to their association with the Catholic Schools Network and their successful implementation at both Rockhurst High School and Marquette University High School. The change in meal provider also resulted in a $450 increase in tuition cost with each lunch now costing $2.62. This project further encompassed renovations to the school's Skinner Chapel.

In 2018, Creighton Prep announced plans to begin construction on a $16 million "learning commons" to provide academic and emotional resources to the student body. The center is named after Rev. Timothy R. Lannon, president of Creighton Prep (1988 to 1995) and president of Creighton University (2011 to 2015). The center was proposed in part to “help assist our young men as they navigate their emotional and academic needs.” (Rev. Tom Neitzke) and includes the addition of an on staff student psychologist. The Learning Commons also included the addition of a "learning differences" specialist, academic coach, director for student outreach and advocacy, and construction of a student services department. Prep also began construction of a 120 ft clock tower alongside the 52,000 sq/ft expansion. Funding for the project came from Scott Heider, managing principal of Charwell Capital, and his wife Cindy Heider who provided $8 million donation and led the capital campaign for the addition costs.

Due to a theft of 27 relics from St. John's Parish, Creighton Prep's relic associated with St. Francis Xavier was relocated, as of 2019.

== Athletics ==
Creighton Preparatory School's athletic teams are known as the Junior Jays. They compete in NSAA District A-1 for football, District A-4 for wrestling and cross country, and District A-2 for track & field. The Junior Jays have won over 160 state championships in various sports. The Creighton Prep student section at athletic events is often referred to as "The Birdcage". The Birdcage is known for its chants, but has been previously criticized for the content of their chants, and alleged acts of vandalism carried out by students. Likewise, due to Creighton Prep's status as an all-male school, it has often been subject to anti-gay chants. There is a rivalry between Creighton Prep and Westside High School in athletics, which is considered the oldest high school rivalry in the state. This rivalry began in 1958 when Prep was moved to its current site was largely formed due to the close proximity of the two schools.

There also exists a rivalry between Creighton Prep and Omaha Central due to their similar academic rigor. This rivalry is born partly out of the 1960 state title football championship where both teams were undefeated and ended the game with a scoreless tie. The title was split with both teams receiving the championship title. This game was viewed by approximately 15,000 people and was later published in the book Omaha Central, Creighton Prep, and Nebraska's Greatest High School Football Game. This game was later featured in the 2016 Journal of Sport History.

The 2013 Class A Boys Soccer State Championship, won by Omaha South High School against Creighton Prep (1-0) at Morrison Stadium, holds the current record as the highest attended soccer match in the State of Nebraska. The estimated attendance of this game was 8,200 people, beating the previous record of approximately 6,900 people held by the Creighton Men's Soccer team. In September, 2020, Creighton Prep's basketball team made a 26 point comeback against Millard West. Referred to as "Creighton Prep's Miracle Comeback", Creighton Prep came back from a 26-0 deficit, scoring 29 points in the last 9 minutes 40 seconds of the game's 4th quarter. This game broke the previous school record (Prep v. Burke, 2012, with Prep making a 25 point comeback) and is the 4th largest high school comeback in Nebraska state history.

=== State championships ===
State championships
Season	Sport	Number of championships	Year
Fall	Football	27	1932, 1933, 1934, 1939, 1940, 1943, 1945, 1947, 1953, 1954, 1955, 1958, 1959, 1960, 1963, 1964, 1969, 1970, 1980, 1983, 1985, 1986, 1987, 1988, 1989, 1999, 2004
Fall	Cross country	5	1973, 1974, 2014, 2023, 2025
Fall	Tennis	35	1927, 1928, 1932, 1934, 1939, 1940, 1942, 1946, 1948, 1949, 1950, 1951, 1952, 1956, 1959, 1961, 1963, 1971, 1972, 1973, 1984, 2001, 2002, 2003, 2004, 2005, 2006, 2008, 2009, 2010, 2012, 2014, 2015, 2016
Winter	Swimming	25	1930, 1931, 1932, 1961, 1969, 1996, 1997, 1998, 1999, 2000, 2001, 2002, 2007, 2008, 2009, 2010, 2011, 2012, 2013, 2014, 2015, 2016, 2017, 2018, 2019, 2020, 2023, 2024, 2026
Winter	Powerlifting	10	2010, 2011, 2012, 2013, 2014, 2015, 2016, 2017, 2018, 2019
Winter	Wrestling	1	2025
Winter	Basketball	13	1924, 1935, 1936, 1940, 1945, 1964, 1969, 1976, 1981, 1994, 2009, 2015, 2018
Spring	Golf	14	1932, 1941, 1951, 1952, 1973, 1991, 2004, 2006, 2012, 2013, 2014, 2015, 2019, 2021
Spring	Track and field	6	1977, 1987, 1992, 2015, 2017, 2023
Spring	Trap Shooting	6	2004, 2005, 2011, 2012, 2014, 2015
Spring	Lacrosse	7	2005, 2006, 2008, 2010, 2018, 2021, 2022, 2023
Spring	Baseball	15	1927, 1928, 1939, 1940, 1942, 1969, 1981, 1993, 2001, 2002, 2004, 2012, 2016, 2017, 2018
Spring	Soccer	11	1988, 1989, 1993, 1999, 2000, 2003, 2011, 2012, 2017, 2023, 2024
Total		170	

=== All Sports Championships ===
All Sports Championship Titles
Sport	Number of championships	Year
All Sports Championships (NSAA)	10	2009, 2010, 2011, 2012, 2013, 2014, 2015, 2017, 2018, 2019
All Sports Championships (Omaha World-Herald)	20	1957, 1981, 1987, 1992, 1998, 2002, 2004, 2005, 2006, 2008, 2009, 2010, 2011, 2013, 2014, 2015, 2016, 2017, 2018, 2019, 2024
Total	30	

== Academics and student life ==
=== Academics ===
Creighton Prep's overarching model for education is based around the Jesuit values of faith, scholarship, leadership and service. Priorities include "cura personalis" or "care for the whole person," Magis, Men and Women for Others, Leadership, and Diversity. This is further expanded upon by Prep's "Graduate at Graduation" (Grad at Grad), which describes the qualities a student at Creighton Prep is expected to develop. The "Grad at Grad" is universally subscribed to by all Jesuit High schools. The "Grad at Grad" profile outlines five character qualities Jesuit high schools aim to instill in their students by the time of the graduation: Open to Growth, Religious, Loving, Intellectually Competent, and Committed to Doing Justice. Creighton Prep has won the U.S. Department of Education Blue Ribbon Award for Academic Excellence twice (1986-1987).

Classes are structured into block scheduling with specific classes taking place on respectively assigned days. These include A, B, and C day schedules with their own designated classes. Creighton Prep does not employ a traditional study hall, rather it uses a municipal class period, referred to as "Community Period", for study hall, masses, and other school activities. Admittance to Creighton Prep is determined by an annual entrance exam held in January.

=== Demographics ===
As of 2019, approximately 16% of the Creighton Prep student body is made up of people of color, with 84% of the student body being white. Of the minority students reported, 5% of students are African American, 3% are Asian, 3% are Latino, and 3% identify as mixed race. 12% of students come from non-Catholic religious beliefs and 88% of student identify as Catholic. 22% of students attended public elementary and middle school, and 78% of students attended private Catholic school, prior to admittance to Prep. Approximately, 45-52% of students receive financial aid. In efforts to increase income and racial diversity in the student body, Creighton Prep began scholarship programs in the mid 2010s, citing that their student body should better reflect the racial and financial demographics of Omaha.

=== Discipline ===
Creighton Prep employs a demerit system as a means to discipline students and enforce school policies. This demerit system is mediated by a "demerit card" and with every 5 demerits a student will receive a detention, referred to as a "Jug" (standing for Justice Under God).

As of fall 2014, Creighton Prep has become the first high school in Omaha to implement a mandatory drug testing policy for the entire student body, with approximately 80-90% of all students being tested annually. The policy change was born out a decade of participation in the Nebraska Risk and Protective Factor Student Survey done by the state to assess the drug usage of the cumulative student body and as an initiative to begin expanding Prep's health and wellness program. The company contracted is Psychemedics, who have also successfully implemented a similar policy at Rockhurst High School. The process involves randomly selecting students to take part in the drug test where hair samples are taken to assess if a student has performed binge drinking, marijuana, PCPs, amphetamines, cocaine and opiates (approx. 90% of all mainstay drugs) during the previous 90 days. For the first offense, the student and his parents or guardian will meet with the student's councilor and discuss interventions. There is no disciplinary punishment enacted by the school but the student must undergo a follow-up test in 90 days which will cost $60. For the second offense, the student will meet with the Dean of Student and must complete a chemical dependency screening, follow recommendations made by the administrators, and undergo a second follow-up test in 90 days. If the student receives a third offense, he will then be dismissed from the school.

=== BASH ===
Annually, Creighton Prep will host a dinner auction in April referred to as BASH (Building a Scholastic Heritage) as a means to provide financial aid to the student body. This includes live and silent auctions, a student-driven raffle, and dinner predominately staffed by student volunteers. The student-led raffle ticket event alone has constituted in nearly $210,000, providing 21 students with full tuition financial aid. BASH annuals has approximately 650-750 attendees and relies on both donors and advertisers as the means of income. Historically, BASH was first held in 1971 and led by J. Don Ashford and Mrs. John Cleary alongside 20 volunteers. This event earned approximately $25,000 which was then employed to fund the financial aid program at the time. In 2016, it was reported that the net proceeds from BASH resulted in over $800,000, constituting a large percentage of the $1.9 million offer in financial aid to the student body.

== Film ==
In April 2016, filming for the movie Downsizing took place at Creighton Prep. Downsizing is a 2017 American science fiction comedy-drama film directed by Alexander Payne, written by Payne and Jim Taylor and starring Matt Damon, Christoph Waltz, Hong Chau, and Kristen Wiig. This film was the first movie to have been shot in Omaha since 2002's "About Schmidt" and the first film to ever feature Creighton Prep. The film stars Matt Damon playing the role of a Creighton Prep alum who, in part of the film, returns to Creighton Prep during a high school reunion. The choice to film at Creighton Prep was decided 2 weeks prior to shooting by director Alexander Payne, who graduated from Creighton Prep in 1979. Set up for the film included conversion of the interior of the school into crew space and decoration of the exterior of the school at Payne's request to feature a large banner with the Creighton Prep's seal. Payne also included several references to Creighton Prep, such as a street named " Creighton Prep Ave", throughout the film. The film project worked in conjunction with Creighton Prep's Fine Arts Department, headed by Jeremy Caniglia. Damon and Payne would later autograph memorabilia to be auctioned off at Prep's BASH fundraiser and the Creighton Prep's students would host a fundraiser for Damon's charity, Water.org.

== Priest sexual assault allegations ==
In 2018, the Midwest Province of the Society of Jesus released documentation disclosing sexual assault allegations surrounding key members of Creighton Prep's clergy. This has included Rev. Willard Dressel (employed at Prep from 1959 to 2003), Rev. J. Roger Lucey (President of Creighton Prep, 1977 to 1982), Rev. J Michael Cannon (employed from 1979 to 1987), Fr. Thomas R. Haller (employed from 1955 to 1980), Rev. Jim Sinnerud (employment terminated in 2018) and Rev. Daniel Kenney (employed from 1965 to 1989). While the former four are deceased, Rev. Kenney was permanently removed from the ministry as of 2003 following eight individual accusations. These documents and the current status of Rev. Kenney's priesthood become public in 2018. It was later revealed by Creighton Prep staff that Rev. Kenney had his previous tenure at Creighton Prep prematurely ended in 1989 for similar accusations involving sexually explicit behavior with students but no official record was kept from the alleged events. Rev. Kenney was laicized in November 2020 and is no longer a Jesuit priest. An interdisciplinary research team at Creighton University received a grant from Fordham University in 2021 to investigate Kenney's abuse and to understand the culture at Creighton Prep that enabled it. Rev. Jim Sinnerud also has received allegations of sexual assault of a minor. This has resulted in his tenure at Creighton Prep in 2018 being terminated and him being barred from participating in ministerial services. This latter accusation came independent of the Midwest Province of the Society of Jesus' release earlier in the year, instead citing an incident that occurred prior to his employment at Creighton Prep. In 2019, "Book of Mormon" star Andrew Rannells released his memoir Too Much Is Not Enough: A Memoir of Fumbling Toward Adulthood, in which, he described sexual encounters that occurred between him and a priest, referred to as pseudonymous "Father Dominic", while attending Creighton Prep.

== Notable alumni ==
- Titus Adams (2001), National Football League player
- Loren Babe, Major League Baseball player (New York Yankees, Philadelphia Athletics)
- Rex Barney (1943), Major League Baseball pitcher (Brooklyn Dodgers)
- Steven Kenneth Bonnell II (2007) (alias "Destiny"), formerly partnered Twitch streamer, now YouTube streamer
- Gutzon Borglum, Mount Rushmore sculptor
- L. Brent Bozell Jr., conservative activist and Catholic writer
- CharMar Brown (2023), college football running back
- Junior Bryant, National Football League defensive lineman
- John Bullock (2019), NFL linebacker for the Tampa Bay Buccaneers
- Jeremy Caniglia, illustrator
- John J. Cavanaugh III (1963), U.S. House of Representatives member
- James M. Connor (1978), actor
- Nicholas D'Agosto, actor
- P. T. Deutermann (1959), author
- Ted DiBiase, former WWE wrestler
- Richard Dooling, novelist, screenwriter, visiting law professor at University of Nebraska College of Law
- Ron Hansen, author (The Assassination of Jesse James by the Coward Robert Ford)
- Andrew Higgins, manufacturer; produced "Higgins boats" (LCVPs) during World War II
- John I. Jenkins, C.S.C., president of the University of Notre Dame
- Tim Kasher, musician (Cursive and The Good Life)
- Mike Lair, politician
- Matt Maginn, musician (Cursive)
- Holt McCallany, actor
- Vincent J. McCauley, C.S.C., Servant of God, first Bishop of Fort Portal, Uganda
- Bill McGuire (1982), Major League Baseball catcher (Seattle Mariners)
- Duncan McGuire, soccer player
- Tim McGuire, college football coach
- C. Edward McVaney, co-founder and former CEO of the JD Edwards Corporation
- Scott Munter, Major League Baseball pitcher
- Emmett Louis Murphy, American attorney and civil servant
- John Nagl, Lt. Col., assisted Gen. David Petraeus in writing the US Army Marine Counterinsurgency Field Manual, current headmaster at The Haverford School
- Robb Nansel, American Musician, co-founder / president of Saddle Creek Records
- Conor Oberst, musician (Bright Eyes)
- James C. O'Brien (1978), American attorney and diplomat who served as the Special Envoy for Hostage Affairs.
- Alexander Payne, film director, Academy Award-winning screenwriter
- Steve Pedersen (1993), musician (Cursive and Criteria)
- Kyle Peterson, Major League Baseball pitcher and ESPN analyst
- Zach Potter (2005), National Football League tight end for the Houston Texans
- Daniel Quinn, author
- Andrew Rannells, Grammy Award-winning actor and singer
- John Patrick Raynor, Twentieth president of Marquette University.
- Robert Rossiter Jr, United States district judge of the United States District Court for the District of Nebraska.
- Michael E. Ryan, United States Air Force general, Chief of Staff of the United States Air Force
- Albert Gerard Schatz, former United States district judge of the United States District Court for the District of Nebraska.
- Thomas Michael Shanahan, former United States district judge of the United States District Court for the District of Nebraska
- Easton Stick (2014), NCAA National Champion Quarterback for North Dakota State University and 2019 NFL draft pick of the Los Angeles Chargers
- Charles A. Vacanti, M.D, American researcher in tissue engineering and stem cells, co-creator of the Vacanti mouse.
- Albert C. Wedemeyer, Army general
- Gene Williams, National Football League offensive lineman
- Bob Wiltfong (1988), The Daily Show correspondent and comedian
- Gary Wiren, PhD. Inducted into PGA Hall of Fame and the World Golf Teachers' Hall of Fame
