= St. John's Parish (Omaha, Nebraska) =

Church building in Omaha, Nebraska, USA

St. John's Church at Creighton University
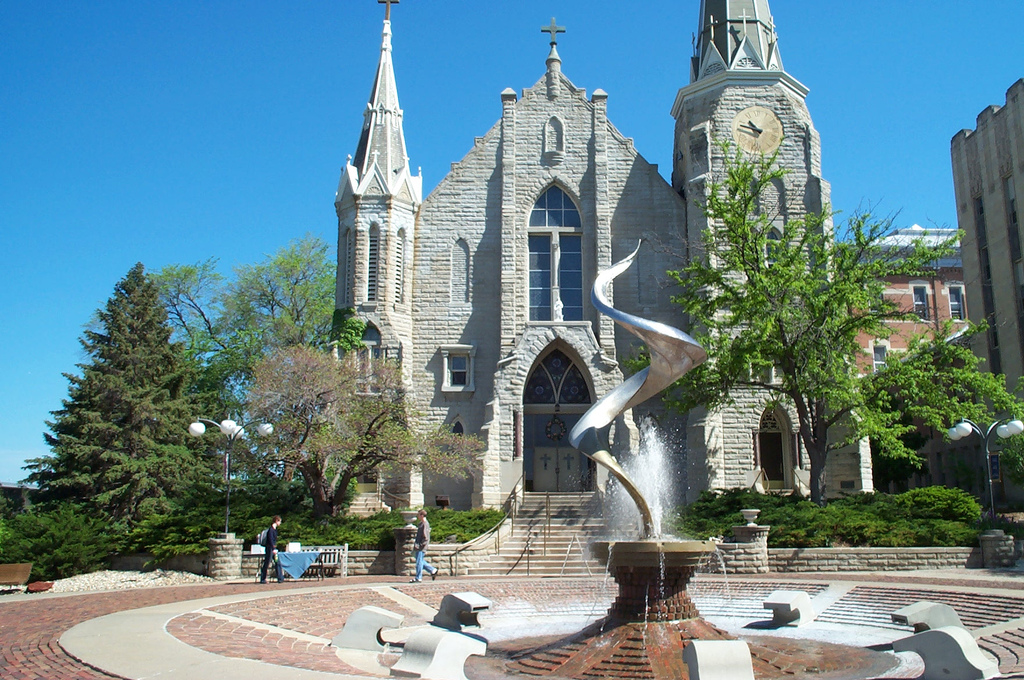

- Location within Nebraska

Religion
- Affiliation: Roman Catholic
- Rite: Latin
- Year consecrated: 1888

Location
- Interactive map of St. John's Church at Creighton University
- Coordinates: 41°15′55.33″N 95°56′51.4″W

Architecture
- Architect: P.J. Creedon
- Style: English Gothic
- Groundbreaking: 1887
- Completed: 1888

Specifications
- Capacity: 1080
- Length: 185 ft.
- Width (nave): 138 ft.
- Designated as NHL

Omaha Landmark
- Designated: January 6, 1981

Website
- stjohns-creighton.org

St. John's Parish is a Roman Catholic church located at 2500 California Plaza on the Creighton University campus in Omaha, Nebraska, United States. It is within the Archdiocese of Omaha and is a ministry of the Midwest Province of the Society of Jesus (Jesuits).

== History ==
The cornerstone was laid on May 6, 1888, drawing 4,000 people, which was the largest crowd ever assembled in Nebraska up to that point. The building was designed by local architect P.J. Creedon in the English Gothic style. In 1897 the church was made a regular parish after the city's original bishop intended for it to only serve as a temporary church for the college-age attendees. John A. Creighton donated much of the original funding for the building. Mary Creighton, John's brother Edward's wife, donated jewelry to the parish construction fund before there was a building.

In 1923 an addition to the building was consecrated by Bishop Patrick A. McGovern, a member of the first graduation class of Creighton College and the only bishop ever consecrated in St. John's.

Renovations to the building were completed in 2006. In February 2015, an elevator was added to the side of St. John's to make the lower level accessible from the main church.

== See also ==
- History of Omaha
- List of Jesuit sites
