= Joseph F. Rigge =

American educator (1842 - 1913)

- Born: July 5, 1842; Attendorn, Germany
- Died: April 17, 1913 (aged 70); Cincinnati, Ohio, USA
- Other names: Joseph Frigge
- Occupation: Jesuit Priest
- Known for: first president of Marquette College

Joseph F. Rigge, S.J. (July 5, 1842 - April 17, 1913) was the first president of Marquette College (now Marquette University) in Milwaukee, Wisconsin.

== Early life ==
Joseph Frigge was born in Paderborn, Westphalia, the son of Frederick Frigge and Elisabeth Zeppenfeld. He was the second of eight children, two of whom died in infancy. In 1854, his family emigrated to America, where they eventually established a home in Cincinnati, Ohio. His early education took place at St. Xavier College (now Xavier University) in Cincinnati, and he entered the Society of Jesus at St. Stanislaus Seminary in Florissant, Missouri on July 10, 1862, changing his surname at this time to Rigge and taking the "F" as a middle initial.

After his studies at St. Stanislaus Seminary, he spent five years teaching English grammar and German at St. Louis University in Missouri and St. Xavier College in his hometown of Cincinnati, before entering Woodstock College in Maryland for studies in philosophy and theology preparatory to the priesthood. Here he was ordained in 1877, after which he returned to teaching math, German, physics and astronomy at St. Louis University.

== First President of Marquette College ==
Rigge was appointed President of Marquette College in Milwaukee just as construction was nearing completion in spring of 1881. There, with the help of five professors, the work of teaching began with only 35 students. However, as a strong reputation for discipline and academics at Marquette College spread, the register of students expanded to 77 by the year's end.

To bring attention to the new school, Rigge proposed to invite the public to an illustrated lecture on the topic of sound, in which he explained many of the latest inventions of the day. The result was that others began to seek his assistance in public expositions; the city's chief electrician even wrote to Rigge to volunteer his assistance at future lectures.

Its reputation established and its class size doubled, Rigge handed over the reins of the college to I. J. Boudreaux in 1882, taking on the role of Assistant Superior and continuing to teach science and German until 1883.

== Teaching at Creighton University ==
When Michael P. Dowling was installed as President of Creighton University in Omaha in July 1885, among his first faculty requests was that Rigge be brought on as head of the science departments. Upon his arrival, on August 21, 1885, he found that the university's benefactor, John A. Creighton, had bestowed upon the science department a large telescope. It was housed in a room in the chemistry building, requiring it to be rolled in and out over rough ground for use. Rigge pointed out that, in addition to making its use difficult and infrequent, this jostling would eventually cause damage to the precision of the instrument. Creighton was approached about the matter and by October, work had begun on Creighton University Observatory, which would properly house the instrument and allow for the fullest use of its capabilities.

Rigge's scientific lectures, which featured many new and unique experiments, gained the notice of the student body as well as the public. He was the first to analyze the petroleum supply in Wyoming, publishing an article on the subject in The Scientific American Supplement. These and other contributions to the prestige of the science department caught the attention of Creighton, and as a result he lavished the department with donations, allowing Rigge to leave a well-equipped Chemistry and Physics Department when he left Creighton in 1894.

Rigge also served as chaplain of the city jail during his time at Creighton, where he spent much time with those who had been condemned to death. He sometimes was asked to accompany one of these to the scaffold, a particularly onerous duty, as it required many days, even months sometimes, to overcome the trauma of witnessing these men's deaths. However, in one case, he succeeded in gaining freedom for a man who had been accused as an accomplice to murder by convincing the murderer to declare just before his execution that he had no accomplices.

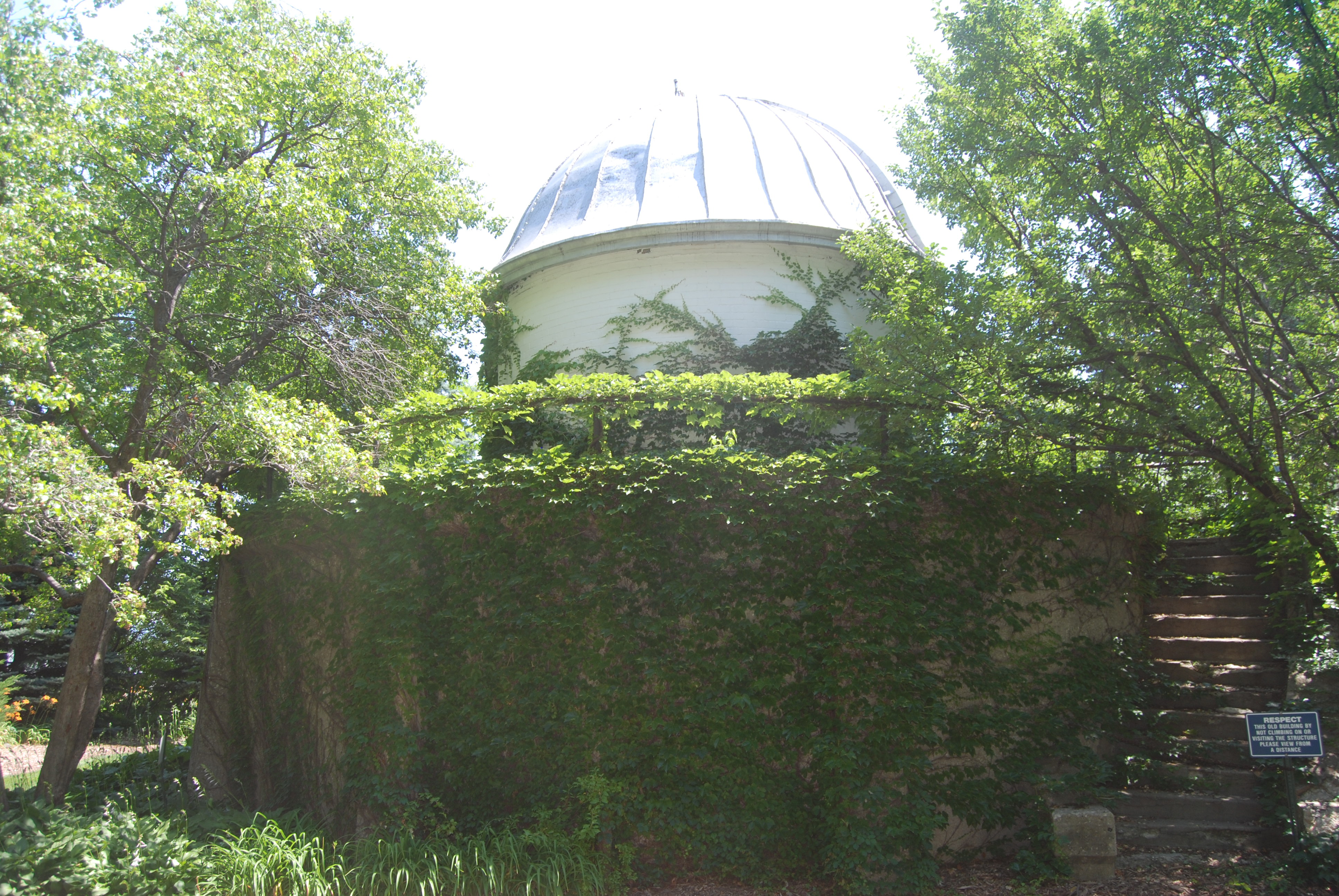
Creighton Observatory as it appeared in July 2013

The Observatory at Creighton was eventually headed by Joseph's youngest brother William Rigge from 1895 until his own death in 1927. Although dilapidated and in disrepair it is still standing on the campus of Creighton to this day.

== British Honduras ==
Within a year after leaving Creighton, during which he taught physics and chemistry at St. Xavier College, Rigge volunteered in 1896 to go to St. John's College, Belize, where he spent two years teaching English grammar. His health forced him to come home for a time, teaching again at Marquette while he convalesced, but he requested permission to return, and spent the years from 1900 to 1905 at mission stations throughout British Honduras, with Corozal Town as his base. He also served as pastor of Sacred Heart Church, Dangriga for a time. Conditions in many of the ranchos he visited were still primitive at this time, and many of the natives still spoke tribal languages, such as Mayan and Garifuna, making the task of teaching the catechism challenging, but Rigge persevered despite his age.

== Return to Cincinnati ==
In 1906 Rigge's health once more forced him to return to his hometown of Cincinnati, where he taught in the science department at St. Xavier College. In 1907, he was assigned as pastor of St. Francis Xavier Church in Cincinnati, where he remained until his death in 1913. Here he was said to have devoted himself to the poor, spending much of his night in sick calls, yet being one of the first to rise in the morning to be ready for confessions, though his was the late Mass.

== Death ==
In late March 1913, a series of winter storms caused the Great Dayton Flood, and despite his 71 years, Rigge made his way to Dayton as the water was reaching its highest levels, to help those suffering its effects. As a result of his exertions, he succumbed to exhaustion and died two weeks later in Cincinnati, on April 17, 1913. He is buried in the old Jesuit plot of the New St. Joseph Cemetery in Cincinnati.

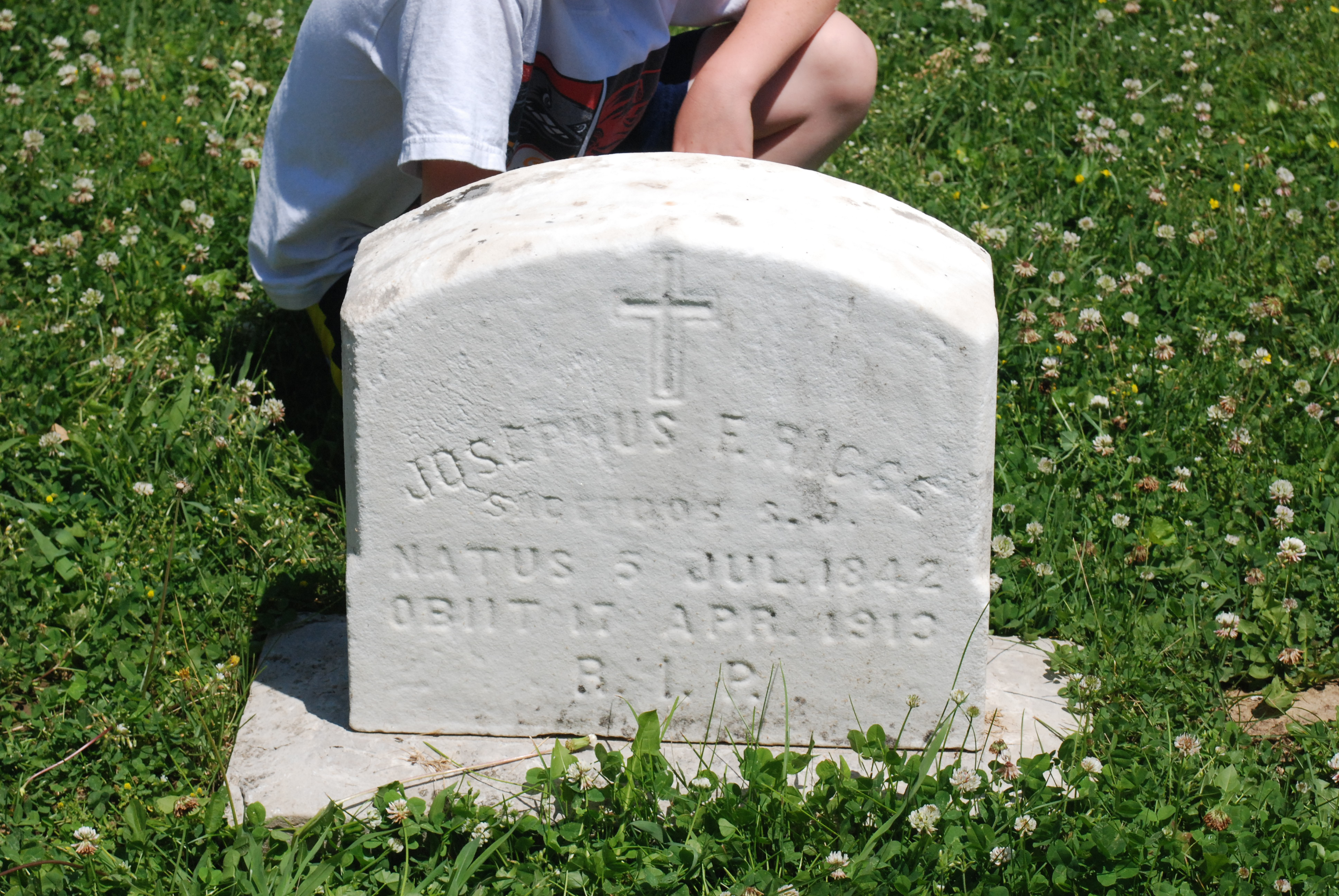
Fr Joseph Rigge Tombstone
