= Titus Adams =

American football player (born 1983)

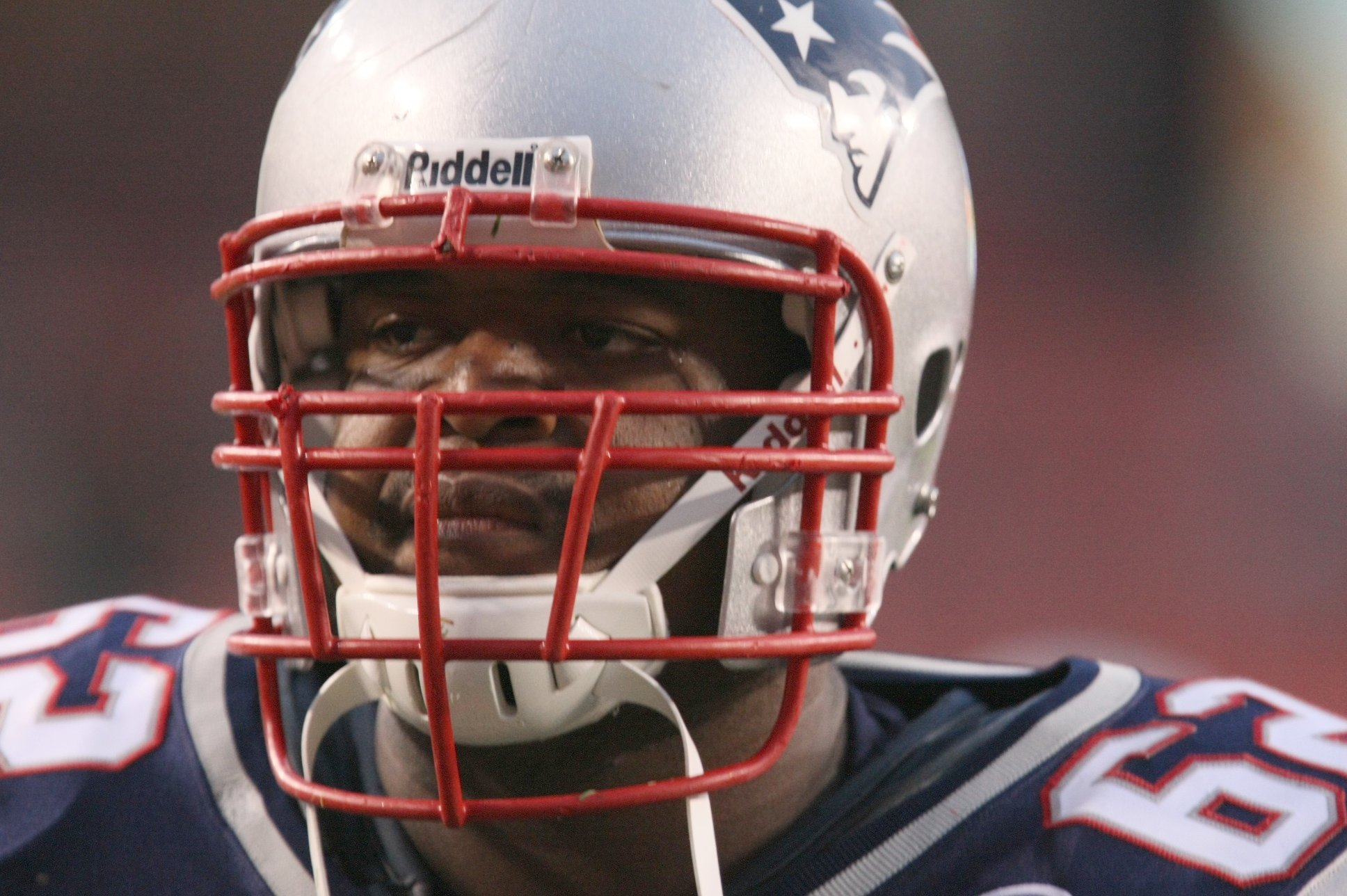
- Adams with the New England Patriots in 2009

No. 62
- Position: Defensive end

Personal information
- Born: January 28, 1983 (age 43); Omaha, Nebraska, U.S.
- Listed height: 6 ft 4 in (1.93 m)
- Listed weight: 305 lb (138 kg)

Career information
- High school: Creighton Prep (Omaha)
- College: Nebraska
- NFL draft: 2006: 7th round, 220th overall pick

Career history
- New York Jets (2006)*; New York Giants (2006); San Diego Chargers (2007)*; Cincinnati Bengals (2008)*; New England Patriots (2008–2009); Cleveland Browns (2009–2010)
- * Offseason or practice squad member only

Career NFL statistics
- Total tackles: 2
- Stats at Pro Football Reference

Titus Adams (born January 28, 1983) is an American former professional football player who was a defensive end in the National Football League (NFL). He was selected by the New York Jets in the seventh round of the 2006 NFL draft. He played college football for the Nebraska Cornhuskers.

Adams was also a member of the New York Giants, San Diego Chargers, Cincinnati Bengals, New England Patriots, and Cleveland Browns.

== Early life ==
Adams was born in Omaha, Nebraska, and was a standout defensive tackle for Creighton Preparatory School. There he was a two-time all-state selection and led his team to the state championship back to back years. They won the state title in 1999, and finished runner-up in 2000. Adams participated in the first ever U.S. Army All-American Bowl game on December 30, 2000, and was named to several All-American teams, including those of Parade magazine and Rivals.com.

== College career ==
Adams played defensive tackle in college for the University of Nebraska–Lincoln. In 49 games with the Cornhuskers, Adams started 22 times. He recorded 135 tackles (60 solos) with 3.5 sacks, 16 tackles for losses and 26 quarterback pressures. He recovered two fumbles, deflected three passes and intercepted two others. He graduated with a degree in business administration.

== Professional career ==
Pre-draft measurables
Height	Weight	Arm length	Hand span	40-yard dash	10-yard split	20-yard split	20-yard shuttle	Three-cone drill	Vertical jump	Broad jump	Bench press
6 ft 3 3/8 in (1.91 m)	306 lb (139 kg)	33 1/8 in (0.84 m)	9 7/8 in (0.25 m)	5.08 s	1.70 s	2.96 s	4.54 s	7.49 s	30.5 in (0.77 m)	8 ft 7 in (2.62 m)	15 reps
All values from NFL Combine

Adams was selected by the New York Jets in the seventh round of the 2006 NFL draft but released by the team on September 2, 2006. He was re-signed to the Jets' practice squad on September 6, 2006. In December of that year, the New York Giants signed Adams from the Jets' practice squad to their 53-man roster. Adams spent the rest of the season with the team and was waived on August 17, 2007. Adams was claimed off waivers by the Chargers on August 20, 2007, but waived on August 31, 2007. The Cincinnati Bengals signed Adams to their practice squad on December 18, 2007. He was re-signed to a future contract on December 31, 2007, but released by the team on July 7, 2008. In July 2008, Adams was signed by the New England Patriots. He was waived on August 30 and re-signed to the team's practice squad on September 1.

After spending the 2008 season on the practice squad, Adams was waived again on September 5, 2009, and re-signed to the team's practice squad the next day. On December 9 he was promoted to the active roster. He played in his first NFL game on December 13 against the Carolina Panthers, recording two tackles at nose tackle. He was waived on December 31.

Adams was claimed off waivers by the Cleveland Browns on January 1, 2010.
