= John A. Creighton =

American businessman and founder of Creighton University (1831–1907)

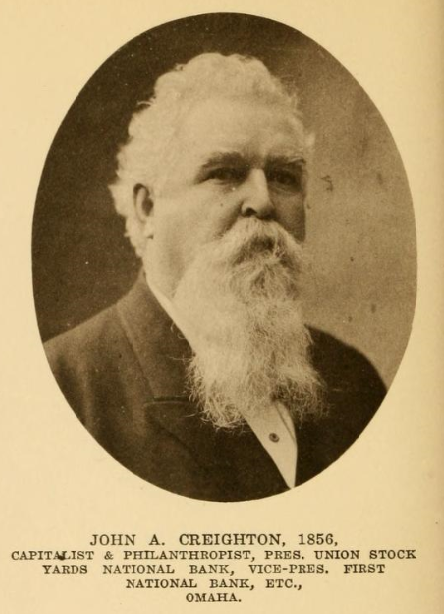
John A. Creighton, 1854-1904 Nebraskans

John Andrew Creighton (October 15, 1831 – February 7, 1907) was a pioneer businessman and philanthropist in Omaha, Nebraska who founded Creighton University. The younger brother of Edward Creighton, John was responsible for a variety of institutions throughout the city of Omaha, and was ennobled by Pope Leo XIII in recognition of his contributions to Creighton University, the Catholic community in Omaha, and the city of Omaha in general.

== Biography ==
Born in Licking County, Ohio, Creighton's first job was working for his brother Edward, installing a telegraph line from Cleveland to Toledo. In 1852 he enrolled in St. Joseph's Dominican School near Somerset, Ohio. In 1856 he came to Omaha as a clerk with a local merchant, and in 1860 he took two jobs moving cattle and freight from Omaha to Denver, Colorado. Around that same period Edward accepted a contract installing 700 miles (1,100 km) of the Pacific Telegraph, the First Transcontinental Telegraph in the United States. John was hired as the superintendent of the construction. In the early 1860s Creighton traveled to Montana to mine gold, eventually installing a telegraph line from Salt Lake City, Utah to Helena, Montana.

During Creighton's life in Montana, he is credited with helping rid the state of the desperados who made it inhospitable towards settlement. In 1865 after he was assaulted and his leg was broken, a local newspaper wrote, "We believe that the only way to kill John Creighton would be to cut his head off and then carry away the body." During this same period of time, Creighton was named a "Colonel" by Montana's acting Governor-General Thomas Francis Meagher.

In 1868 John Creighton returned to Omaha permanently, where he established a grocery business in Jobber's Canyon. In 1868 John married Sarah Emily Wareham, the sister of Mary Lucretia Creighton, who was married to John's brother Edward. When Edward died suddenly in 1874, his wife Mary became committed to his notion of creating a free college in Nebraska. She died in 1876, leaving a considerable amount of money along with strict instructions for the foundation of the college in her husband's honor. John, his cousin James, and Herman Kountze, a banker and family friend, were the executors of Edwards will. Acting in that capacity they purchased the present site of the University and proceeded to erect what is now called Creighton Hall.

John's wife Sarah died September 3, 1888; before her death, she bequeathed a business block near Downtown Omaha to the yet-to-be-established Creighton College. By the early 1890s he was attributed to holding, "more of the valuable real estate of the city [of Omaha] than any other individual." He owned a railroad company, was a large stockholder in the Omaha Cable Tramway Company, heavily interested in the South Omaha syndicate responsible for building up much of that area, and was Vice-President of the First National Bank of Omaha.

In 1884 Creighton was a delegate to the Democratic National Convention at Chicago where Grover Cleveland was nominated for President of the United States.

=== Philanthropy ===
From its founding in 1878 to the time of his death in 1907 Creighton was said to have donated at least $2,000,000 to Creighton University. In 1888 Creighton financed the Creighton University Observatory, and in 1898 he gave money towards a medical school, which was named in his honor. In 1904 he created the Edward Creighton Institute. Creighton is also credited with establishing Omaha's St. Joseph's Hospital and bringing the first monastery of the Poor Clares in the country to the city. He paid for almost the entire cost of St. John's Parish at Creighton, where the cornerstone was laid in 1888.

=== Recognition ===
Today Creighton University in Omaha is viewed as being named in honor of the entire Creighton family, particularly John and his brother Edward, as well as their wives Sara and Emily. He was named a Knight of St. Gregory on January 15, 1895 by Pope Leo XIII, and in 1898 was titled a Count by the same. Though the Constitution of the United States, in order to maintain equality of citizens, prohibits Americans from accepting or using titles of nobility. In 1900 Creighton received the Laetare Medal from the University of Notre Dame. Omaha's John A. Creighton Boulevard was named after him immediately after his death in 1907, as is the existent "John A. Creighton University Professorship" at Creighton University.

The Creighton Orpheum Theater in Downtown Omaha was named in honor of John after he donated a significant portion of its construction costs.

== See also ==
- History of Omaha
- Founding figures of Omaha, Nebraska
