= D. S. Malik =

Indian-American mathematician (1958–2025)

- Born: Davender Singh Malik; 14 August 1958; Pinana, Punjab, India
- Died: 13 May 2025 (aged 66); Omaha, Nebraska, U.S.
- Education: University of Delhi; University of Waterloo; Ohio University
- Occupation: Mathematician

Davender Singh Malik (14 August 1958 – 13 May 2025) was an Indian-American mathematician and professor of mathematics and computer science at Creighton University.

== Education ==
Malik attended the University of Delhi in New Delhi, India, receiving his bachelor's and master's degrees in mathematics, where he won the Prof. Ram Behari Gold Medal in 1980 for his high marks. Then at the University of Waterloo in Ontario, Canada, he received a master's degree in pure mathematics. In the United States, Malik went to Ohio University, earning an M.S. in computer science, and a Ph.D. in mathematics in 1985, writing his dissertation on "A Study of Q-Hypercyclic Rings."

== Career ==
In 1985, Malik joined the faculty of Creighton University, teaching in the mathematics department. In 2013, he became the first holder of the Frederick H. and Anna K. Scheerer Endowed Chair in Mathematics. His research focused on ring theory, abstract algebra, information science, and fuzzy mathematics, including fuzzy automata theory, fuzzy logic, and applications of fuzzy set theory in other disciplines.

In the academic community, Malik was a member of the American Mathematical Society and Phi Kappa Phi. Within his community, he co-created a Creighton program in which faculty help area high school students pursue scientific research, to be published in their own student journal.

Malik published more than 45 papers and 18 books. He created a computer science line of textbooks that includes extensive and complete programming examples, exercises, and case studies throughout using programming languages such as C++ and Java.

== Death ==
Malik died on 13 May 2025, at the age of 66.

== Books ==
The books he wrote include:

Programming

- C++ Programming: From Problem Analysis to Program Design (1st ed., 2002; 8th ed. 2017)
- C++ Programming: Program Design Including Data Structures (1st ed., 2002; 8th ed. 2017)
- Data Structures Using C++ (1st ed., 2003; 2nd ed. 2010)
- Data Structures Using Java (2003)
- Java programming: From Problem Analysis to Program Design (1st ed., 2003; 5th ed. 2012)
- Java programming: Program Design including Data structures (2006)
- Java programming: Guided Learning With Early Objects (2009)
- Introduction to C++ Programming, Brief Edition (2009)

Mathematics

- Fundamentals of Abstract Algebra (1997)
- Fuzzy Commutative Algebra (1998)
- Fuzzy Discrete Structures (2000)
- Fuzzy Mathematics in Medicine (2000)
- Fuzzy Automata and Languages: Theory and Applications (2002)
- Fuzzy Semigroups (2003)
- Application of Fuzzy Logic to Social Choice Theory (2015)
