= Bob Wiltfong =

American media personality (born 1969)

- Born: Robert Wiltfong; Omaha, Nebraska, U.S.
- Website: http://www.theBSDictionary.com

Robert Wiltfong (born November 26) is a TED Talk speaker, author, and former correspondent on The Daily Show on Comedy Central.

== Career ==
Wiltfong was a true-life newscaster for 10 years, making him the first correspondent in Daily Show history to have worked as a traditional news reporter. In an interview, he revealed that he decided to leave the world of non-satirical journalism after the September 11, 2001 attacks, during which he lost a close friend, cameraman Glen Pettit.

Wiltfong has won four regional, individual Emmys for television performance, and has been nominated for 14 others. He was part of The Daily Show's 2004 winning submission for the Peabody Award, and was featured on the election year wrap-up DVD put out by Comedy Central.

He was a member of Neutrino, an improv comedy team in New York City.

Wiltfong has been featured in national commercials for AOL, Microsoft, Staples, and Domino's Pizza. He plays the recurring character Chet Wallum on It's Always Sunny in Philadelphia.

In 2010, Wiltfong was selected to star in a national ad campaign for Nationwide Insurance, playing the Nationwide spokesman in a series of nationally broadcast television commercials that aired throughout 2010.

In 2020, Wiltfong published a book with Tim Ito titled The BS Dictionary: Uncovering the Origins and True Meanings of Business Speak. The book's content became the subject of a TEDx Talk Wiltfong delivered in Vienna, Austria in October 2022. The presentation was later upgraded to a full TED Talk a year later.
