= Demerit (school discipline) =

School punishment

A demerit is a point given to a student as a penalty for bad behavior. Under this once common practice, a student is given a number of merits during the beginning of the school term and a certain number of merits are deducted for every infraction committed.

Schools use the demerit record within a point-based system to punish misbehavior. After a certain number of demerits are accumulated, the student is given detention, loss of privileges (e.g., being denied field trips and participation in school events), or some other punishment based on the seriousness and frequency of the infraction.

One criticism of demerit systems is that they create bookkeeping problems and can result in students receiving severe punishments for minor infractions. Another criticism is that older adolescents learn how to manipulate a demerit system. There are also critics who cite that demerits wear parents down with constant parental meetings and leave students behind due to missed instructional time as a consequence of punishments such as detention and suspension.
