= Edward Creighton =

American pioneer businessman

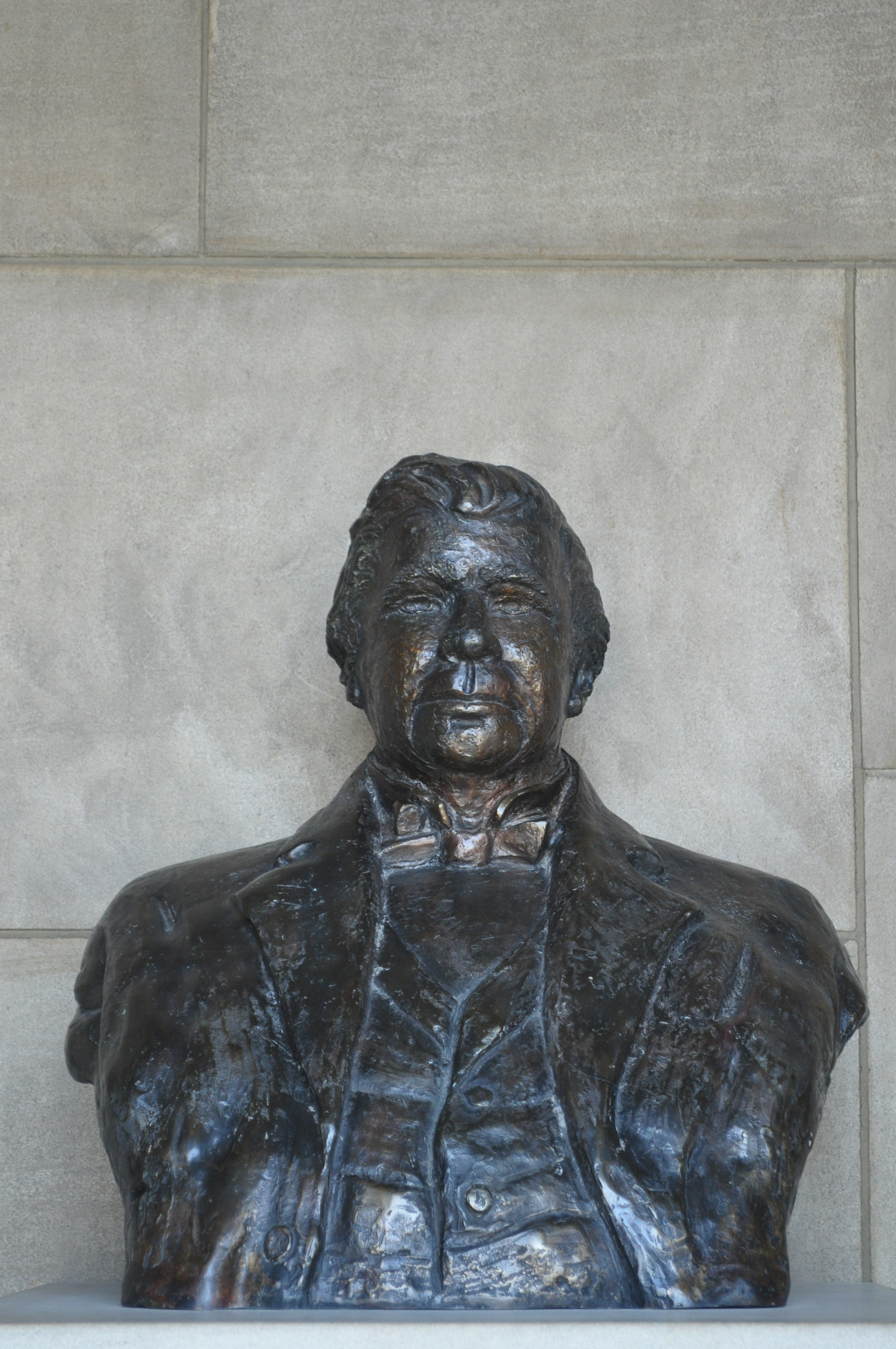
- Edward Creighton bust created by Phyllis Aspen in 1983, Nebraska Hall of Fame
- Born: August 31, 1820; Belmont County, Ohio
- Died: November 5, 1874 (aged 54)
- Occupation: Pioneer businessman
- Known for: Founding many institutions that were central to the growth and development of Omaha

Edward Charles Creighton (August 31, 1820 – November 5, 1874) was a pioneer businessman in early Omaha, Nebraska. The elder brother of John A. Creighton, the Creightons were responsible for founding many institutions that were central to the growth and development of Omaha. Married to Mary Lucretia Creighton in their native Dayton, Ohio, Edward relied on Mary to carry out his request to create a college, which eventually became Creighton University.

== Biography ==
Creighton was born on a farm in Belmont County, Ohio in 1820. He was raised in an Irish Catholic family, and was always active in Church affairs. In the 1840s, he became involved in the freight shipping/telegraph businesses. By 1856, he had become one of the largest builders of telegraph lines in the United States. He married Mary Lucretia Wareham in Dayton, Ohio on October 7, 1856; the couple moved to Omaha after their wedding. He quickly became involved in several business ventures in Omaha, including wagon freighting, merchandising, real estate, banking, railroading and ranching. In the winter of 1860-61, Creighton surveyed the route of the proposed Transcontinental Telegraph line between Omaha and Sacramento, to be built with the financial support of Western Union. He dug the first post hole for the telegraph line on July 2, 1861; the line was completed on October 24, 1861. During this expedition, Creighton established friendly relationships with a number of tribes along the route. Throughout his life, Creighton championed the cause of Native Americans and repeatedly spoke out against their mistreatment. This stance brought him into conflict with the U.S. Army as well as local politicians including his brother, John Creighton.

Creighton turned his attention to banking and railroading. He served as the first president of First National Bank of Omaha and was one of the founders of the Omaha and Northwestern Railroad. The Creighton brothers invested heavily in the Union Pacific Railroad which ran a route parallel to their telegraph line. The Creighton brothers knew both Abraham Lincoln and Stephen Douglas, both of whom had stated their desire to construct a transcontinental railroad. He fought unsuccessfully for Omaha's selection as the eastern terminus of the Union Pacific Railroad (an honor given to Council Bluffs, Iowa). A high ranking railroad official touring early Omaha had been beaten and robbed and the city was considered to be too wild and corrupt for such a venture.

During the Civil War, the Creighton brothers were staunchly anti-slavery and vocally pro-Union. They raised volunteer regiments in Nebraska, Iowa, and Ohio to fight for the Union. John Creighton worked in the quartermaster corp and was responsible for stringing telegraph lines between the War office and the mobile fronts. Edward Creighton had been told to stay out of southeast Nebraska and northwest Missouri due to threats made against him by Confederate sympathizers who controlled these areas.

After the armistice, The Creightons bought up parcels of land along the railroad route and opened cattle ranches. They began to ship their cattle to Omaha and markets in Kansas. John Creighton opened the first packing plant on land he owned in South Omaha which became the nucleus for the city's huge food processing industry. They encouraged Irish and German immigrants to settle along the route by building Catholic and Lutheran churches along the right of way and seeing to it that local Indian tribes were placated. All their business ventures thrived and the brothers amassed a considerable fortune.

For his church building and other services, John Creighton was made a Papal Count, and given a titled estate on Vatican held lands outside Naples.

== Legacy ==
Both Creighton brothers contributed heavily to social and educational causes in the Omaha area. Edward Creighton provided the funds for an order of hospital nuns to come to Omaha in the 1860s, and a second order shortly thereafter. St. Catherine's and St. Joseph's hospitals were built and staffed as a result of their support. John Creighton also contributed heavily to the construction of a Methodist hospital. St. Joseph's entered into a working relationship with the burgeoning railroads in the area and at one time was the largest hospital west of Chicago. After Edward's death, his widow oversaw a further expansion and the hospital was officially renamed as the Creighton Brothers St. Joseph's hospital. It was the prime teaching hospital for the city based medical school which was incorporated into Creighton University in the 1890s. The present day route of Interstate 80 runs along the course taken by Edward Creighton's telegraph line.

The Creighton College, later separating into Creighton Preparatory Schools and Creighton University, was opened in 1878. In 1905, the Edward Creighton Institute was built at 210 South 18th Street in downtown Omaha. It served as the home of Creighton University's law and dental schools from 1905 to 1921, when an expanding enrollment forced both schools to move to other, larger buildings. The Institute building is now known as the Arthur Building.

Two roadways in Omaha are named for the brothers: Edward Creighton Avenue lies on the south side of Hanscom Park, and John A. Creighton Boulevard lies in North Omaha from Bemis Park to Paxton Boulevard.

In 1958, Edward Creighton was inducted into the Hall of Great Westerners of the National Cowboy & Western Heritage Museum.

In 1982, Edward Creighton was inducted into the Nebraska Hall of Fame.
