= Creighton University =

Jesuit university in Omaha, Nebraska, U.S.

- Former name: Creighton College (1878–1958)
- Type: Private research university
- Established: September 2, 1878; 148 years ago
- Accreditation: HLC
- Religious affiliation: Roman Catholic (Jesuit)
- Academic affiliations: AJCU; ACCU; NAICU; Space-grant
- Endowment: $866.6 million (2025)
- President: Daniel S. Hendrickson
- Provost: Mardell A. Wilson
- Rector: Nicholas Santos
- Faculty: 692 full-time and 282 part-time (fall 2022)
- Students: 8,838 (fall 2024)
- Undergraduates: 4,647 (fall 2024)
- Postgraduates: 4,191 (fall 2024)
- Location: Omaha, Nebraska, United States; 41°15′53″N 95°56′46″W
- Campus: Large city, 132 acres (53.4 ha)
- Newspaper: Creightonian
- Other campuses: Grand Island; Phoenix
- Colors: Blue; White
- Nickname: Bluejays
- Sporting affiliations: NCAA Division I – Big East
- Mascot: Billy Bluejay
- Website: creighton.edu

Creighton University (/ˈkreɪtən/) is a private research university in Omaha, Nebraska, United States. Founded by the Society of Jesus in 1878, the university enrolled 8,838 undergraduate and graduate students as of fall 2024. In addition to the main 140-acre (57 ha) campus just outside downtown Omaha, the university operates the Creighton University Medical Center and has a second campus focused on health sciences in Phoenix, Arizona. It is accredited by the Higher Learning Commission and is classified among "R2: Doctoral Universities – High research activity". Its athletic teams compete in NCAA Division I as the Creighton Bluejays.

== History ==
The university was founded as Creighton College on September 2, 1878, through a gift from Mary Lucretia Creighton, who stipulated in her will that a school be established in memory of her husband, Omaha businessman Edward Creighton. The college began with 120 students, taught by five Jesuits and two lay teachers. Edward's brother, John A. Creighton, is credited with fostering and sustaining the university's early growth and endowment. In 1878, the College of Arts and Sciences was established, and it remains Creighton's largest college. In 1885, the Creighton University Observatory was built on campus. Women were first admitted in 1913.

In 1958, the college split into Creighton Preparatory School and Creighton University. The university ran a four-year series of celebrations from 2012 to 2015 commemorating the 50th anniversaries of the four sessions of the Second Vatican Council. In 2021, the university opened its Phoenix Health Sciences Campus.

== Academics ==
Academic rankings

National
- Forbes: 194
- U.S. News & World Report: 104
- Washington Monthly: 311
- WSJ/College Pulse: 127

Creighton has nine schools and colleges.

- College of Arts & Sciences: the university's largest school, containing about 28% of all enrolled students
- Heider College of Business
- College of Nursing
- School of Dentistry
- School of Medicine
- School of Pharmacy & Health Professions
- School of Law
- College of Professional and Continuing Education
- Graduate School

== Demographics ==
Student body composition as of May 2, 2022
Race and ethnicity	Total
White	72%
Hispanic	9%
Asian	8%
Other (Note: Other consists of multiracial Americans and those who prefer to not say.)	6%
Foreign national	2%
Black	2%
Economic diversity
Low-income (Note: The percentage of students who received an income-based federal Pell grant intended for low-income students.)	12%
Affluent (Note: The percentage of students who are a part of the American middle class at the bare minimum.)	88%

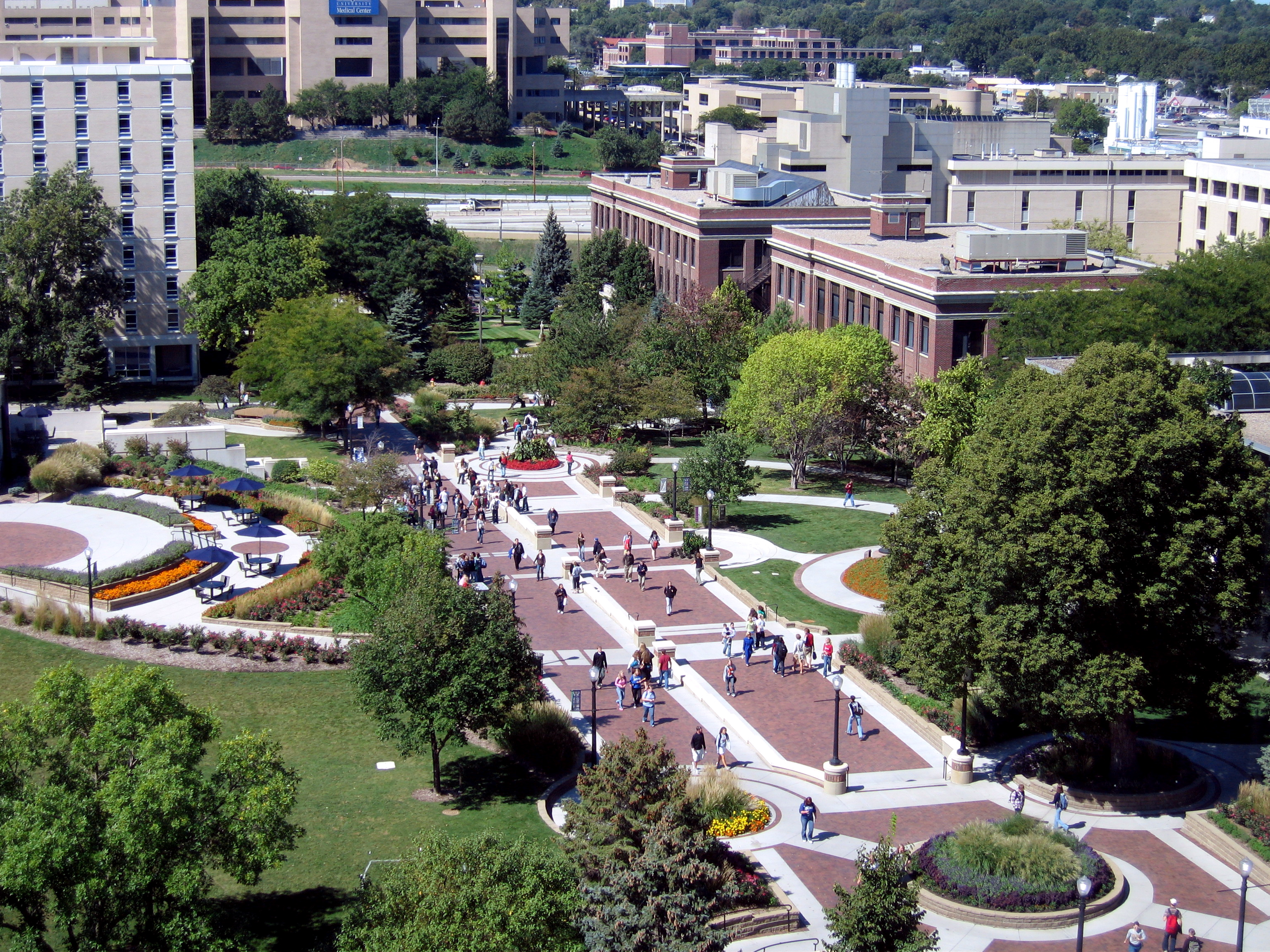
University mall

As of spring 2025, Creighton has a total enrollment of 8,403. Of those, 4,276 are undergraduates and 4,127 are graduate students.

Of Creighton's class of 2020, 14% count themselves as first-generation college attendees in their families. 26% are students of color, and 56% of the class is female.

== Admissions ==
Creighton University reported an acceptance rate of 72% in 2022. In fall 2023, 7,248 first-year students applied, 5,241 were admitted, and 1,044 enrolled.

== Student clubs and organizations ==
The university has more than 200 student organizations.

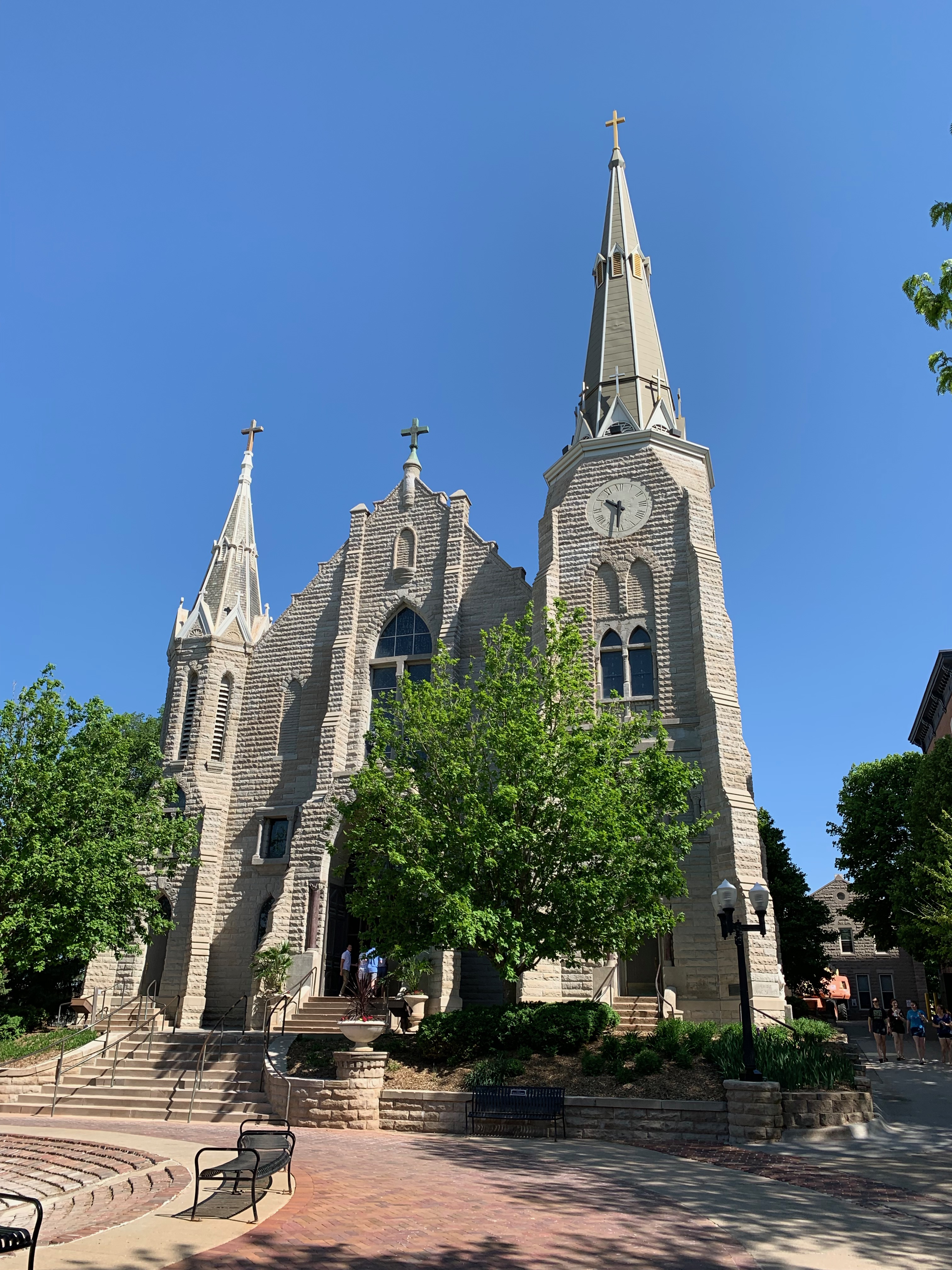
St. John's Church

=== John P. Schlegel, S.J. Center for Service and Justice ===
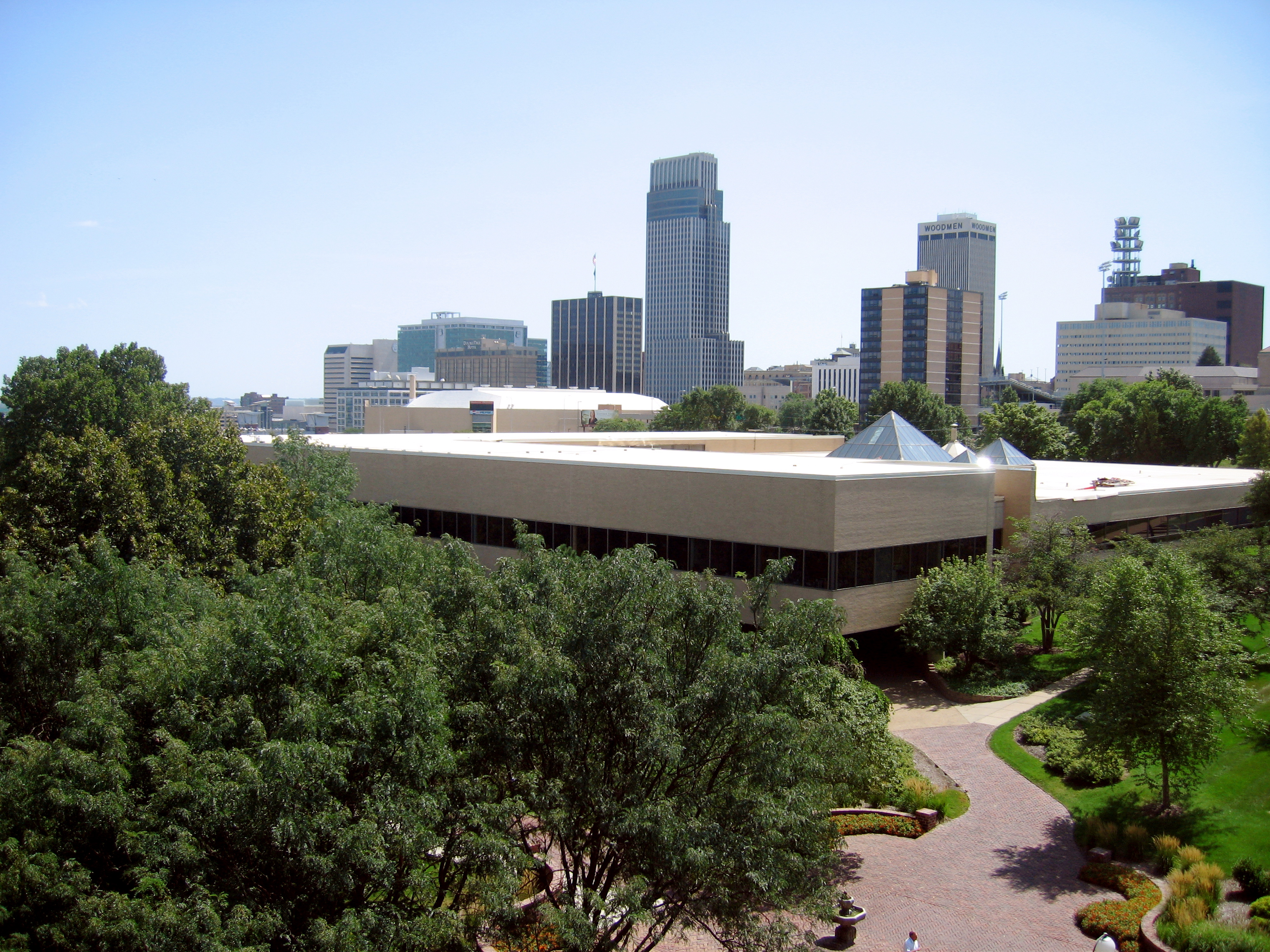
Law school with downtown in background

The John P. Schlegel, S.J. Center for Service and Justice (SCSJ) promotes service projects and education about justice.

=== Performing arts ===
- The Department of Fine and Performing Arts houses a Chamber Choir, Gospel Choir, Jazz Ensemble, Wind Ensemble, Orchestra, and University Chorus. The men's a cappella ensemble is known as the Creightones.
- The Creighton Dance Company's repertoire draws on classical ballet, contemporary and modern dance, jazz and musical theatre dance.
- Theatrical productions are held in the university's Lied Education Center for the Arts.

=== Student media ===
- The student newspaper is The Creightonian. It was a finalist for the 2007 and 2010 Pacemaker Award for college journalism.
- Shadows is Creighton's literature and arts publication.

== Notable alumni ==
More than 68,470 Creighton alumni live in 93 countries. Nearly 30% live in Nebraska. The largest number of alumni outside the United States reside in Canada, Japan, and Malaysia.

== Notable faculty ==
- Raymond J. Bishop
- Virgil Blum
- Patrick Borchers
- Barbara Braden
- Raymond A. Bucko
- Judith M. Burnfield
- John Calvert
- Edward P. J. Corbett
- Frank Crawford
- Blase J. Cupich
- Ross Horning
- Henry T. Lynch
- D. S. Malik
- Francis I. McKenna
- R. R. Reno
- Joseph F. Rigge
- William J. Riley
- Robert F. Rossiter Jr.
- Roger Lawrence Schwietz
- Hugh Sidey
- Constantine Joseph Smyth
- William O. Stephens
- Lyle Elmer Strom
- LaNada War Jack

== See also ==
- Education in North Omaha, Nebraska
- Saint Joseph Hospital at Creighton University Medical Center
