= Psychemedics Corporation =

- Type: Public
- Traded as: Nasdaq: PMD; Russell Microcap Index component
- Headquarters: Acton, Massachusetts, U.S.
- Key people: Raymond C. Kubacki (CEO)
- Products: Tests for drugs of abuse.
- Services: Clinical laboratory
- Website: psychemedics.com

Psychemedics Corporation is a United States corporation which provides patented, FDA-cleared, CAP certified clinical laboratory services for the detection of drugs of abuse. The company's corporate headquarters are located in Acton, Massachusetts and its laboratory operations are located in Culver City, California.

== Technology ==
Dr. Werner Baumgartner was responsible for founding Psychemedics and spearheading its initial research. A nationally recognized expert on drug testing through hair samples, Dr. Baumgartner gained acclaim by procuring some strands of hair from the 19th-century poet John Keats. Despite the age of the hair, Baumgartner was able to detect that the poet, who died at the age of 26 from tuberculosis, had been taking an increasing amount of opium before his death, most likely used in painkillers. Dr. Baumgartner's find created a minor sensation, enough to warrant a mention in a 1985 Time magazine cover story about drugs in the workplace.

After years of research proved that drugs deposited in the hair can be accurately measured, the company was formed in 1987 and pioneered the use of hair testing in commercial markets including banks, manufacturers, retailers, mining operations, hotels and casinos. The technology capitalizes on the way the body metabolizes ingested drugs as they flow through the blood stream and deposit in the cortex of the hair. Hair is stable and the deposits are permanently embedded in the hair, so hair acts like a tape recorder — “recording” drug deposits in proportion to use over time as drugs are deposited in proportion to use. Hair grows at approximately the rate of ½ an inch per month and takes about 5 days to grow out past the external layer of skin. Psychemedics’ standard test uses a 1 ½ inch sample of head hair, which provides an approximate 3 month history of drug use. Body hair can also be collected if head hair is not available.

Psychemedics hair tests are available in Brazil through the company's independent distributor, Psychemedics Brazil. The partnership goes back over 15 years and the drug tests are provided at clinics throughout Brazil, and then shipped to the lab in Culver City, California for analysis.

Hair testing analyzes the hair shaft, rather than body fluids like urine or saliva, to determine whether illegal drugs are present. Compared to analysis of body fluids, hair testing is highly resistant to evasion by adulterating or substituting samples, or by simply abstaining from drug use for a few days. Though Psychemedics previously used a proprietary radio immunoassay (RIA) method, they have since switched to the industry-standard enzyme immunoassay screening method, which has been successfully employed for years by competitors such as Quest Diagnostics. They use GC/MS/MS or LC/MS/MS confirmation to measure the drug molecules and metabolites within the hair which were incorporated following ingestion.

The Psychemedics technology includes tests for cocaine, marijuana, opiates (including heroin and oxycodone), methamphetamine, Ecstasy (MDMA), Eve (MDEA) and phencyclidine (PCP). A standard test of approximately one-and-one-half inches of head hair cut close to the scalp can provide a several month window to detect drug ingestion.

In 2013, Psychemedics Corporation began offering hair based alcohol Ethyl glucuronide testing. This testing was previously attempted by laboratories in the United Kingdom, but has suffered from numerous lawsuits. Due to the concerns of legal risk, few laboratories offer this type of testing anymore, as they deem it unreliable and unsupportable. The Society of Hair Testing also notes the limitations of EtG, stating that this form of testing can determine "chronic excessive alcohol consumption only. This consensus is not applicable for determination of abstinence from alcohol or moderate consumption of alcohol." SoFT also states that "It is not advisable to use the results of the hair testing for alcohol markers in isolation," supporting the belief that additional testing evidence is required to properly identify an individual's alcohol usage. As such, this form of testing is only applicable for scenarios where severe alcohol abuse is present.

The U.S. Substance Abuse and Mental Health Services Administration has cautioned that the test is "scientifically unsupportable as the sole basis for legal or disciplinary action" because the highly sensitive tests "are not able to distinguish between alcohol absorbed into the body from exposure to many common commercial and household products containing alcohol or from the actual consumption of alcohol."

The U.S. Food and Drug Administration has not granted FDA clearance to the Psychemedics Corporation for their EtG Alcohol test at this time, which brings the accuracy of this test into question.

== Controversies ==
In May, 2014, it was announced that The Psychemedics Corporation would be providing hair testing services to three private Cleveland-area schools. Journalists quickly noted a severe conflict of interest, as James Kubacki, Principal of St. Edward's High School, is the brother of Raymond Kubacki, CEO of The Psychemedics Corporation. The Plain Dealer noted that this fact was not disclosed to parents, revealing that it "wasn't stated at the institution-wide meetings to discuss with students their soon-to-be-curtailed privacy."

This is not the first time that The Psychemedics Corporation has been scrutinized for questionable business tactics, having previously hired the high ranking employees of their clients. "Dr. George Elder, a principal for decades, says he instituted drug testing for all students and faculty members at his school. Now he's Psychemedics vice president and pitchman."

== Hair Testing History ==
- 1858: Hoppe-Seyler publishes report finding arsenic in the hair in an 11-year old buried body.
- 1978: Dr. Werner Baumgartner, PhD develops a radioimmunological(RIA)method for detecting drug use from hair specimens.
- 1987: Psychemedics begins offering services commercially
