= Creighton University Observatory =

Former observatory in Omaha, Nebraska, U.S.

- Creighton University Observatory c. 1908
- Interactive map of the Creighton University Observatory area

General information
- Location: Omaha, Nebraska, U.S.
- Coordinates: 41.26607294493844°N 95.94740920881382°W
- Opened: May 6, 1886
- Closed: April 25, 2022
- Demolished: 2022
- Owner: Creighton University

The Creighton University Observatory was an observatory in Omaha, Nebraska, United States. Located on the campus of Creighton University, it opened in 1886, and was founded by Rev. WIlliam F. Rigge. It was the first observatory in Omaha, and the second in Nebraska. It was used primarily for the instruction of students, though the directors did do some research in the observatory. The observatory was demolished in late April 2022 to allow for the construction of a new Jesuit residence hall.

== History ==
The Creighton University Observatory originally began as the Creighton College Observatory in 1885. The observatory began construction in October 1885 and was completed in December of that same year. It was founded by Rev. William F. Rigge. The observatory became fully operational in 1886, after the installation of its first telescope. Following the death of its founder in 1926, the observatory had been almost entirely vacant.

In 1954, the observatory was renovated by the Creighton Prep Astronomer's Club as a memorial to Rigge. By the 1970s, light pollution caused the observatory to fall out of use. In 1988, after flood lights were installed on the campus, the observatory became unusable. The observatory closed to the public shortly after. The observatory was demolished in 2022 following years of disrepair. The site was later re-developed into a Jesuit Residence Hall, which opened in 2023.

== See also ==
- List of astronomical observatories
