= Mary Lucretia Creighton =

American philanthropist who endowed the founding of Creighton University

Mary Lucretia Creighton (February 3, 1834 – January 23, 1876) was an American philanthropist who left a bequest of $200,000 in her will to enable the founding of Creighton University in honor of her husband, Edward Creighton.

== Biography ==
Creighton was born with the name Mary Lucretia Wareham in Dayton, Ohio. Edward's brother John married Sarah Emily Wareham of Dayton, Ohio; through this marriage, Edward met Sarah's sister, Mary Lucretia, whom he later married. They married October 7, 1856. Two years later, they had their only child, Charles David, who died at age five in 1863.

== Legacy ==
Creighton University presents an annual award known as the Mary Lucretia and Sarah Emily Creighton Award, which recognizes administrators, students, faculty, and staff who support the achievement and professional development of women. Formerly called the Mary Lucretia Creighton Award, it was later renamed to honor both Mary Lucretia and Sarah Emily Creighton.

== See also ==
- History of Omaha
